= Neckarsulm station =

Railway station in Neckarsulm, Germany

Neckarsulm
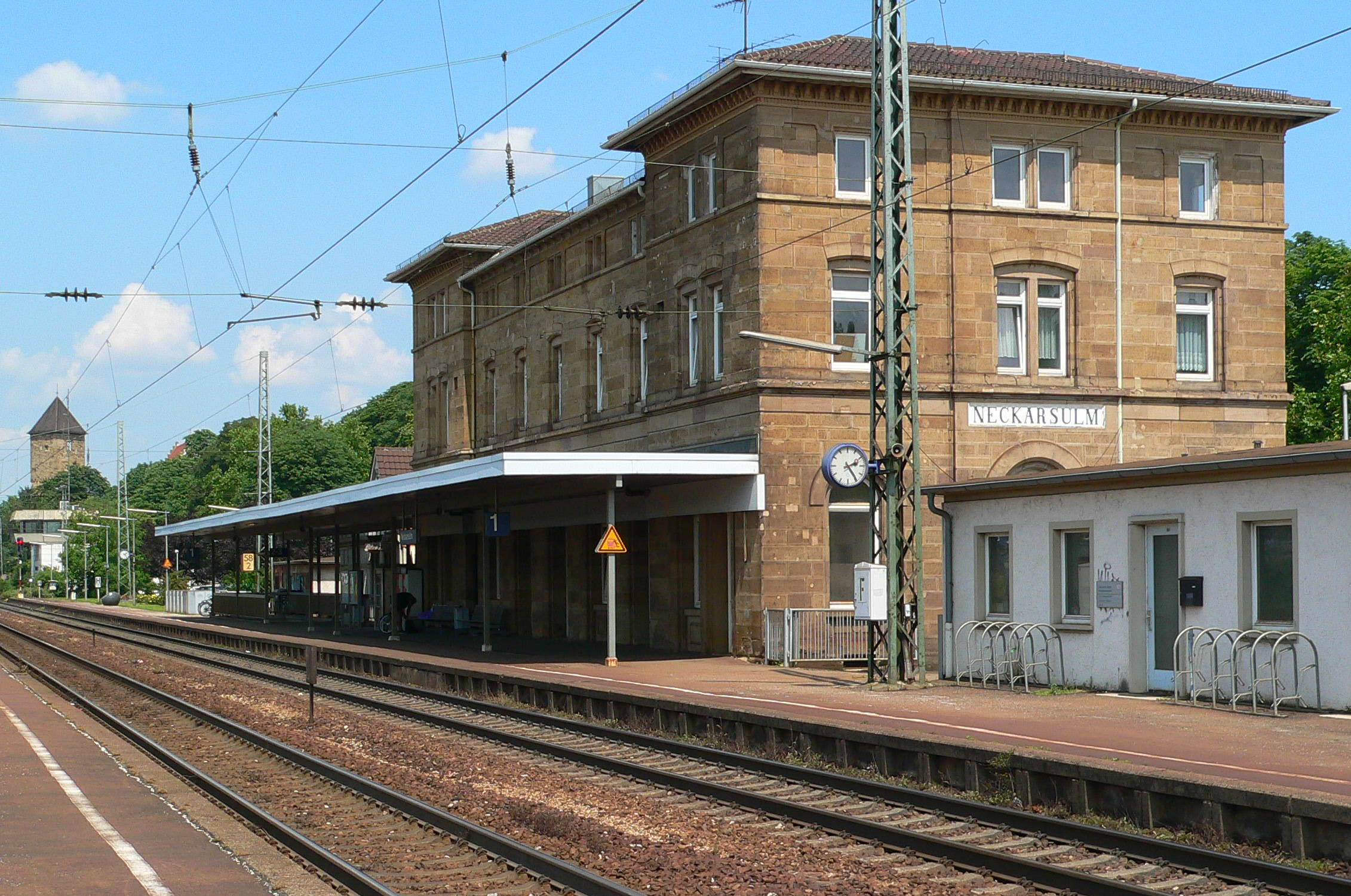
- 2007

General information
- Location: Am Bahnhof 1; 74172 Neckarsulm; Baden-Württemberg; Germany
- Coordinates: 49.1887°N 9.2200°E
- Elevation: 155 m (509 ft)
- Owner: Deutsche Bahn
- Operator: DB Netz; DB Station&Service
- Lines: Franconia Railway (KBS 780)
- Platforms: 2 island platforms 1 side platform
- Tracks: 5
- Train operators: Go-Ahead Baden-Württemberg; SWEG Bahn Stuttgart
- Connections: S 41 S 42

Construction
- Parking: yes
- Cycle facilities: yes
- Accessible: yes

Other information
- Station code: 4322
- DS100 code: TN
- IBNR: 8004220
- Category: 4
- Fare zone: HNV: B/21
- Website: www.bahnhof.de

History
- Opened: 11 September 1866; 159 years ago

Services
Preceding station		Following station
Heilbronn Hbf towards Stuttgart Hbf	RE 8	Bad Friedrichshall Hbf towards Würzburg Hbf
Preceding station	(Stuttgart)	Following station
Bad Friedrichshall Hbf towards Mannheim Hbf	RE 10a	Heilbronn Sülmertor towards Heilbronn
Bad Friedrichshall Hbf towards Mannheim Hbf	RE 10b	Heilbronn Sülmertor towards Heilbronn
Bad Friedrichshall Hbf towards Tübingen Hbf	MEX 12	Heilbronn Sülmertor towards Mosbach-Neckarelz
Bad Friedrichshall Hbf towards Tübingen Hbf	MEX 18	Heilbronn Sülmertor towards Osterburken
Preceding station	Heilbronn Stadtbahn	Following station
Neckarsulm Mitte towards Mosbach (Baden)	S 41	Neckarsulm Süd towards Heilbronn Hbf
Neckarsulm Mitte towards Sinsheim (Elsenz) Hbf	S 42	Neckarsulm Süd towards Heilbronn Hbf
Location

Neckarsulm station is a railway station in the municipality of Neckarsulm, located in the Heilbronn district in Baden-Württemberg, Germany.
