= Steinsfurt station =

Railway station in Sinsheim, Germany

Steinsfurt
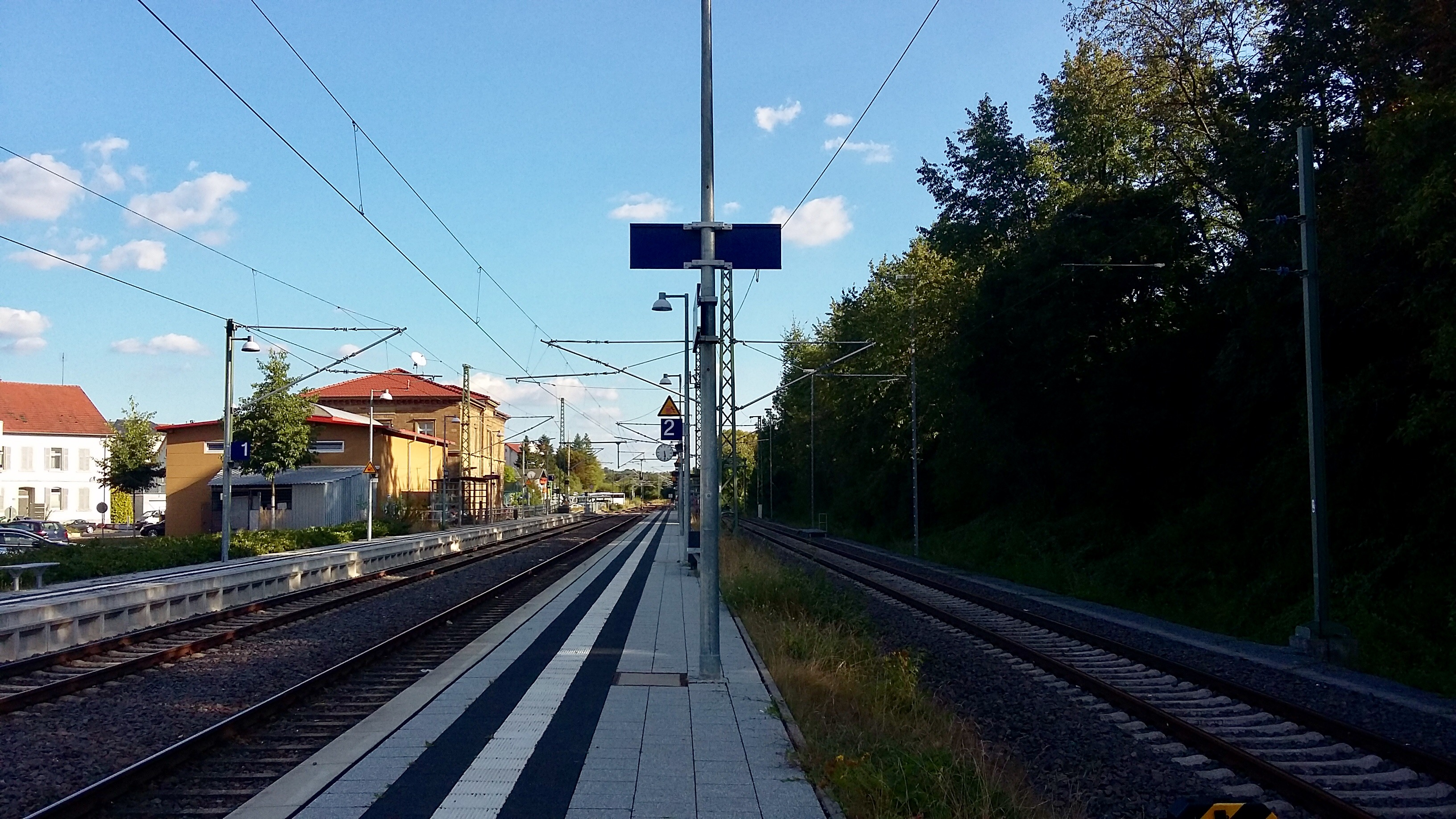
- 2016

General information
- Location: Ansbachstraße 33; 74889 Steinsfurt; Baden-Württemberg; Germany
- Coordinates: 49.236°N 8.908°E
- Elevation: 168 m (551 ft)
- System: Bf
- Owner: Deutsche Bahn
- Operator: DB Station&Service
- Lines: Elsenz Valley Railway (KBS 665.5); Steinsfurt–Eppingen railway (KBS 665.5)
- Platforms: 2 side platforms
- Tracks: 3
- Train operators: Heilbronn Stadtbahn; S-Bahn RheinNeckar
- Connections: S5; S 42; 765 767

Construction
- Parking: yes
- Cycle facilities: yes
- Accessible: yes

Other information
- Station code: 6005
- DS100 code: RSS
- IBNR: 8005714
- Category: 6
- Fare zone: VRN: 186; HNV: 401 (VRN transitional tariff)
- Website: www.bahnhof.de

Services
Preceding station	(Stuttgart)	Following station
Sinsheim (Elsenz) Hbf towards Mannheim Hbf	RE 10b	Bad Rappenau towards Heilbronn
Preceding station	Rhine-Neckar S-Bahn	Following station
Sinsheim Museum/Arena towards Heidelberg Hbf	S5	Reihen towards Eppingen or Bad Rappenau
Sinsheim Museum/Arena towards Heidelberg Hbf	S5	Grombach towards Bad Rappenau
Preceding station	Heilbronn Stadtbahn	Following station
Sinsheim Museum/Arena towards Sinsheim (Elsenz) Hbf	S 42	Grombach towards Heilbronn Hbf
Location
- Location within Baden-Württemberg Location within Germany Location within Europe

Steinsfurt station (German: Bahnhof Steinsfurt) is a railway station in the municipality of Steinsfurt, located in the Rhein-Neckar-Kreis in Baden-Württemberg, Germany.
