= Neckarsulm Nord station =

Railway station in Neckarsulm, Germany

Neckarsulm Nord

General information
- Location: NSU-Straße; 74172 Neckarsulm; Baden-Württemberg; Germany
- Coordinates: 49.2019°N 9.2287°E
- System: Hp
- Owner: Deutsche Bahn
- Operator: DB Netz; DB Station&Service
- Lines: Franconia Railway (KBS 780)
- Platforms: 2 side platforms
- Tracks: 2
- Train operators: Albtal-Verkehrs-Gesellschaft

Construction
- Parking: yes
- Cycle facilities: no
- Accessible: yes

Other information
- Station code: 8270
- DS100 code: TNSN
- IBNR: 8004238
- Category: 5
- Fare zone: HNV: B/21
- Website: www.bahnhof.de

Services
Preceding station	Heilbronn Stadtbahn	Following station
Bad Friedrichshall-Kochendorf towards Mosbach (Baden)	S 41	Neckarsulm Mitte towards Heilbronn Hbf
Bad Friedrichshall-Kochendorf towards Sinsheim (Elsenz) Hbf	S 42	Neckarsulm Mitte towards Heilbronn Hbf
Location
- Location within Baden-Württemberg Location within Germany Location within Europe

Neckarsulm Nord station (German: Haltepunkt Neckarsulm Nord) is a railway station in the municipality of Neckarsulm, located in the Heilbronn district in Baden-Württemberg, Germany.

It is adjacent to the major Audi motor factory.
