= Bad Wimpfen station =

Railway station in Bad Wimpfen, Germany

Bad Wimpfen
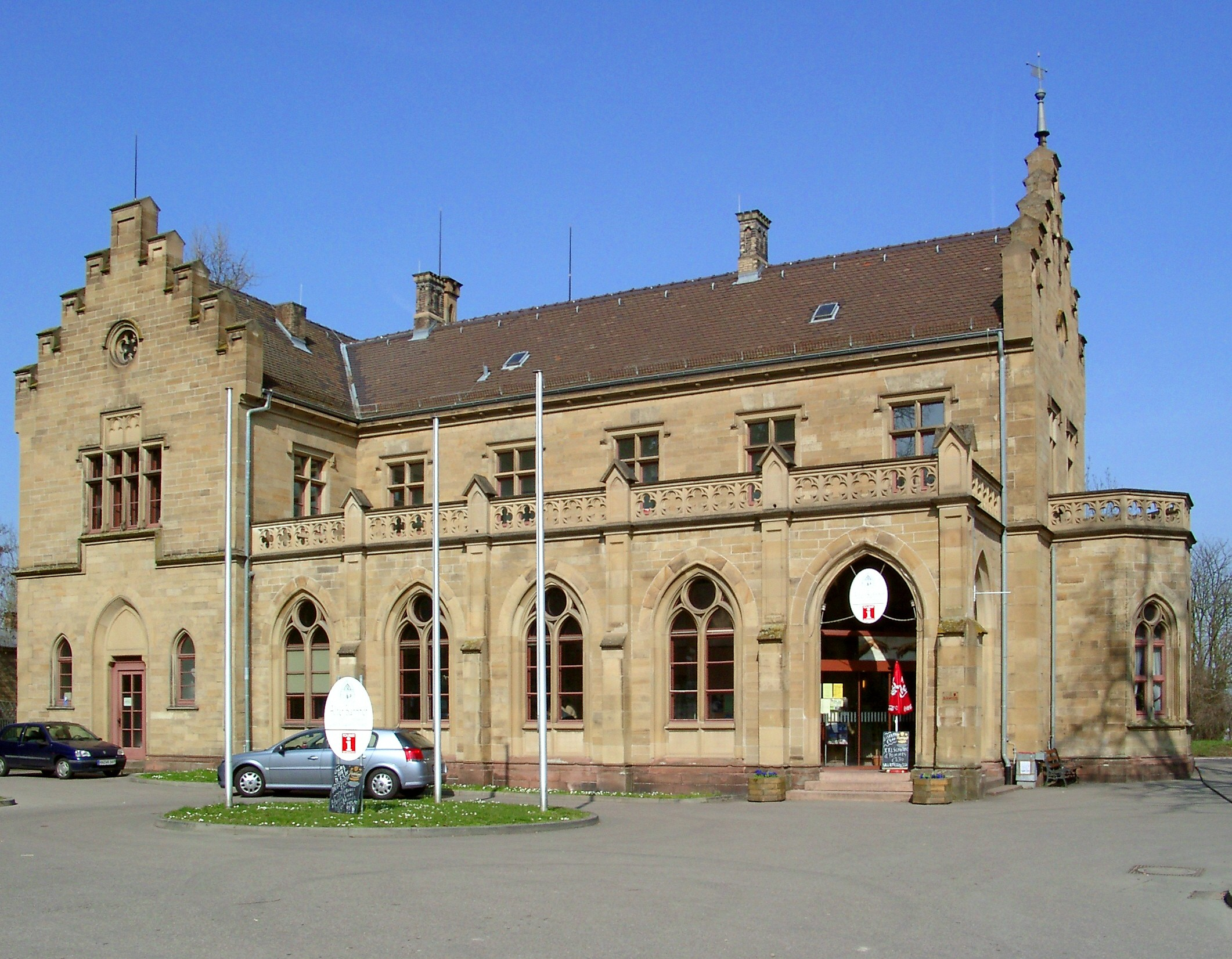
- Station building

General information
- Location: Eulenberger Hof, Bad Wimpfen, Baden-Württemberg; Germany
- Coordinates: 49°13′47″N 9°10′04″E
- Owner: Deutsche Bahn
- Operator: DB Netz; DB Station&Service
- Line: Elsenz Valley Railway (km 33.8)
- Platforms: 2

Construction
- Accessible: Yes
- Architectural style: Gothic Revival

Other information
- Station code: 364
- DS100 code: RBWF
- IBNR: 8000364
- Category: 6
- Fare zone: HNV: 41; VRN: 217 (HNV transitional tariff, select tickets only)
- Website: www.bahnhof.de

History
- Opened: 1868

Services
Preceding station	(Stuttgart)	Following station
Bad Rappenau towards Mannheim Hbf	RE 10b	Bad Friedrichshall Hbf towards Heilbronn
Preceding station	Heilbronn Stadtbahn	Following station
Bad Wimpfen-Hohenstadt towards Sinsheim (Elsenz) Hbf	S 42	Bad Wimpfen im Tal towards Heilbronn Hbf
Location

Bad Wimpfen station is a station in a station in the spa town of Bad Wimpfen in the German state of Baden-Württemberg. It is at the kilometre 33.8 point on the Elsenz Valley Railway. It is classified by Deutsche Bahn as a category 6 station. The station building is heritage-listed.

== Location ==
Bad Wimpfen station is located at the eastern edge the Wimpfen am Berg district in the centre of the spa town. Directly east of the station, the line crosses state road 530, which is called Carl-Ulrich-Straße at this point. The address of the station is Carl-Ulrich-Straße 1.

== History ==
=== Opening of the station ===
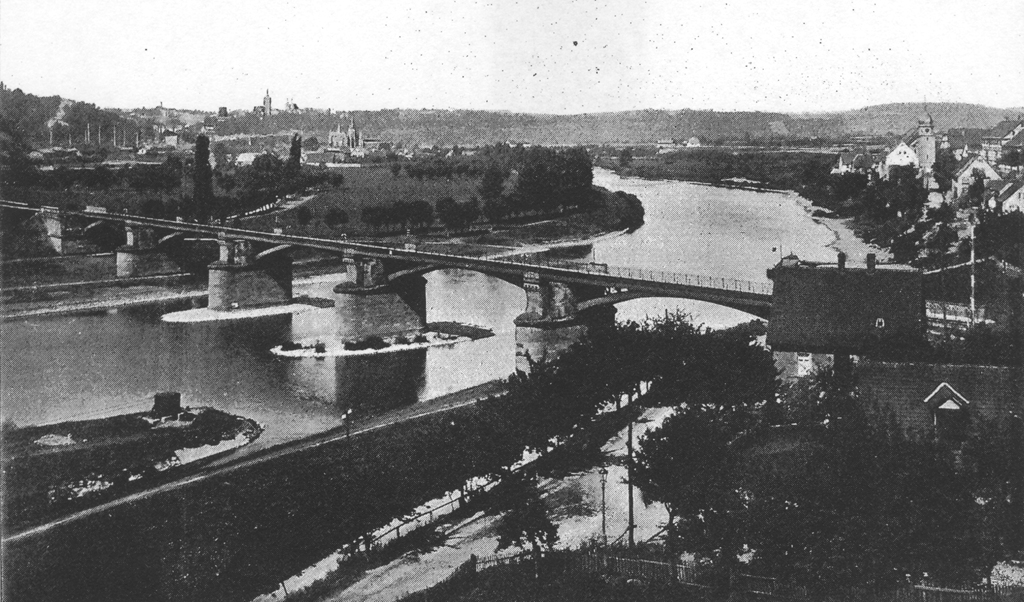
The bridge over the Neckar between Bad Wimpfen and Bad Friedrichshall (1907)

Bad Wimpfen station was opened in 1868 with the building of the railway from Heilbronn via Bad Friedrichshall, Sinsheim, Meckesheim and Neckargemünd to Heidelberg in the 1860s. The railway gave a substantial stimulus to the business of the spa, which was opened in 1817.

=== Upgrade of the station and inclusion in the Stadtbahn ===
As part of the expansion of Heilbronn Stadtbahn northern branch, the Bad Rappenau–Bad Friedrichshall section was closed for upgrading between 7 January 2014 and 1 May 2015. At the same time, Bad Wimpfen station was upgraded as a two-track crossing station and the bridge over the L 530 was rebuilt as a two-track bridge.

== Station building ==
The very stately Bad Wimpfen station building is a massive two-storey building in the Gothic Revival style with numerous decorative shapes such as tracery windows on the ground floor and an angular structure with gables. The building served until 1992 as a station building and was then rebuilt as a restaurant and the town's tourist information centre. It is the only station in Southern Germany built in the Gothic Revival style that still exists. The building is listed by Baden-Württemberg as a grade 2 monument.

== Rail operations ==
=== Passenger services ===
Bad Wimpfen is located on the Elsenz Valley Railway, running from Heilbronn via Sinsheim to Heidelberg. The railway line was extensively renovated from 7 January 2014 to the end of April 2015 and reopened on 1 May 2015. During this period, replacement buses ran between Sinsheim, Bad Rappenau and Neckarsulm. Services of the RE 2 line of DB Regio (since December 2019 operated as RE 10b of Abellio BW) has been running between Mannheim, Heidelberg, Sinsheim and Heilbronn and line S 42 of the Heilbronn Stadtbahn have run between Sinsheim, Bad Rappenau, Bad Wimpfen, Bad Friedrichshall, Neckarsulm and Heilbronn since May 2015. These have been operated by SWEG Südwestdeutsche Landesverkehrs since January 2022, as a result of the insolvency of Abellio BW.

Until early January 2014, Regionalbahn service RB 74 ran hourly between Sinsheim, Bad Rappenau, Bad Wimpfen and Bad Friedrichshall (some to/from Heilbronn) and Regional-Express service RE 2 ran between Mannheim, Heidelberg, Sinsheim and Heilbronn every two hours. The two services were operated with class 425 EMUs.

=== Freight traffic ===
A freight train runs regularly from Heilbron to the Solvay chemical plant in Bad Wimpfen.

== Bad Wimpfen Im Tal station ==
During the preparation for the integration of part of the Elsenz Valley Railway in the Heilbronn Stadtbahn, the new single-platform Bad Wimpfen Im Tal station was built in the Wimpfen im Tal district of Bad Wimpfen. This station has been served by line S 42 of the Heilbronn Stadtbahn since 1 May 2015. The station is at kilometer 35.3 and thus immediately before the bridge over the Neckar between Bad Wimpfen and Bad Friedrichshall Hauptbahnhof.
