= Bad Friedrichshall Hauptbahnhof =

Railway station in Germany

Bad Friedrichshall Hbf
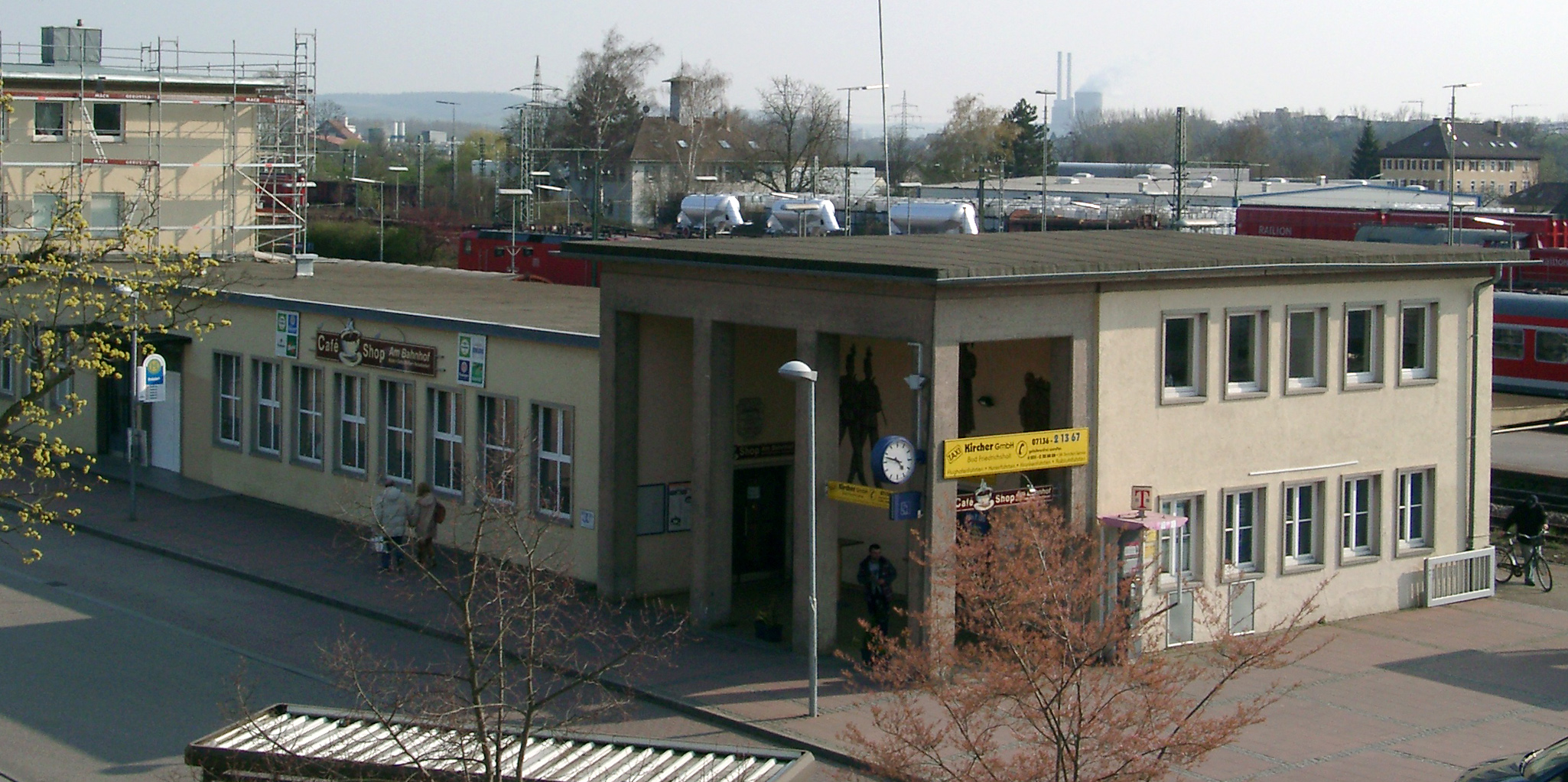
- Station building from the north

General information
- Location: Jagstfelder Str. 99, Bad Friedrichshall, Baden-Württemberg; Germany
- Coordinates: 49°13′55″N 9°11′58″E
- Owner: Deutsche Bahn
- Operator: DB Netz; DB Station&Service
- Lines: Franconia Railway (KBS 780); Neckar Valley Railway (KBS 705); Elsenz Valley Railway (KBS 706); until 1993: Lower Kocher Valley Railway
- Platforms: 6

Construction
- Accessible: Yes
- Architect: Carl Julius Abel (1866); Emil Schuh (1955)

Other information
- Station code: 277
- DS100 code: TBF
- IBNR: 8000017
- Category: 3
- Fare zone: HNV: 142; VRN: 217 (HNV transitional tariff, select tickets only)
- Website: www.bahnhof.de

History
- Opened: 11 September 1866
- Former names: Bad Friedrichshall-Jagstfeld

Services
| Preceding station | | Following station |
|---|---|---|
| Neckarsulm towards Stuttgart Hbf | RE 8 | Möckmühl towards Würzburg Hbf |
| Preceding station | (Stuttgart) | Following station |
| Mosbach-Neckarelz towards Mannheim Hbf | RE 10a | Neckarsulm towards Heilbronn |
| Bad Wimpfen towards Mannheim Hbf | RE 10b | Neckarsulm towards Heilbronn |
| Mosbach-Neckarelz towards Tübingen Hbf | MEX 12 | Neckarsulm towards Mosbach-Neckarelz |
| Untergriesheim towards Tübingen Hbf | MEX 18 | Neckarsulm towards Osterburken |
| Preceding station | Heilbronn Stadtbahn | Following station |
| Offenau towards Mosbach (Baden) | S 41 | Bad Friedrichshall-Kochendorf towards Heilbronn Hbf |
| Bad Wimpfen im Tal towards Sinsheim (Elsenz) Hbf | S 42 | Bad Friedrichshall-Kochendorf towards Heilbronn Hbf |
Location

Bad Friedrichshall Hauptbahnhof is a regionally important junction station and a former border station in the city of Bad Friedrichshall in the German state of Baden-Württemberg. The modern Elsenz Valley Railway and Neckar Valley Railway branch from the Franconia Railway here. Until 1993 it was the starting point of the Lower Kocher Valley Railway.

Until 13 December 2014 it was called Bad Friedrichshall-Jagstfeld station.

== History ==
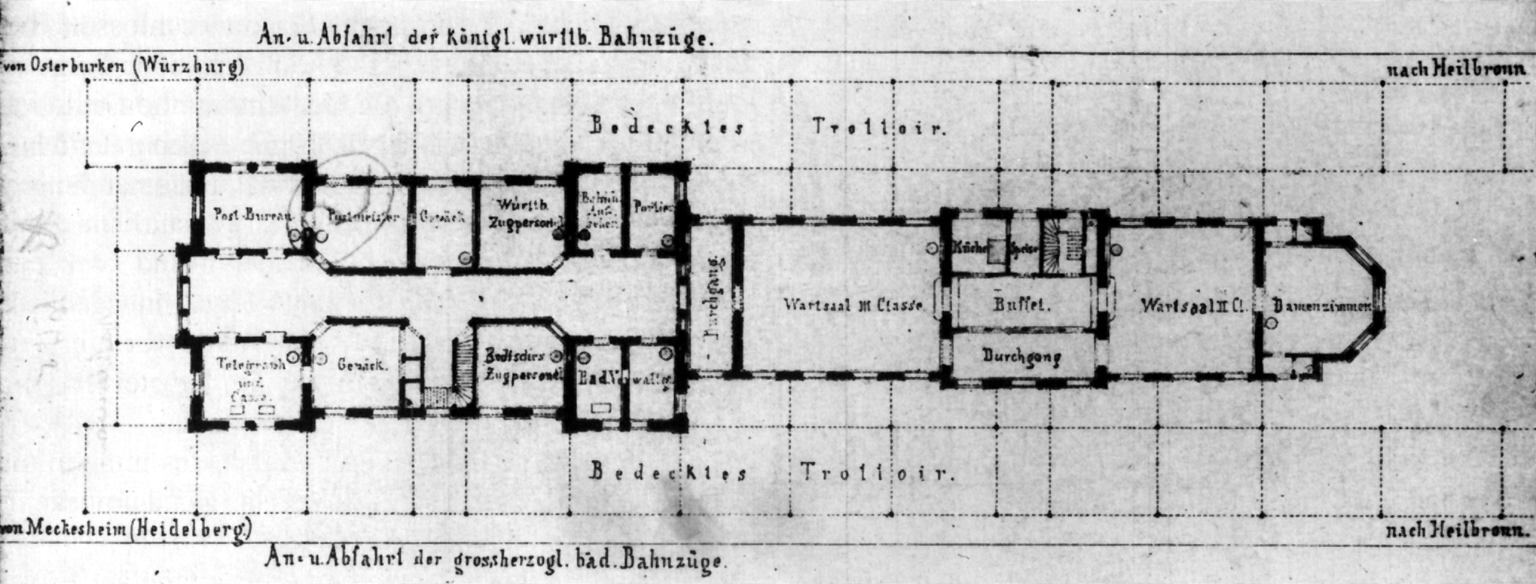
Floor plan of the original station building of 1867 with Baden and Württemberg sides

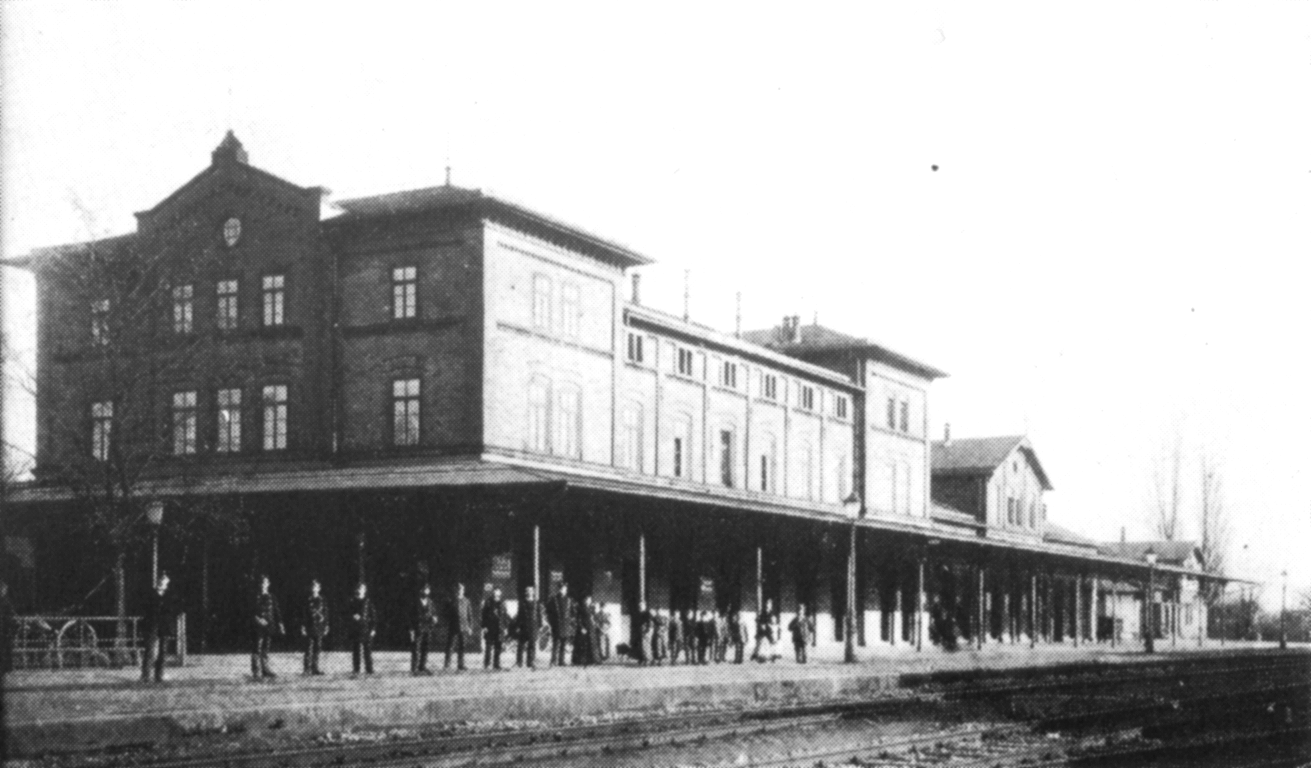
Former station building from the north west (1909)

The Royal Württemberg State Railways (German: Königlich Württembergischen Staats-Eisenbahnen, KWSt.E) opened the station in 1866 on the Neckar Railway (Neckarbahn) and Lower Jagst Railway (Untere Jagstbahn) from Heilbronn to Osterburken in the then independent town of Jagstfeld. This route is now considered part of the Franconia Railway (Frankenbahn). In 1869 the Grand Duchy of Baden State Railway (BadStB) opened the West Fork Railway (Westlichen Gabelbahn, the modern Elsenz Valley Railway) to Meckenheim, connecting to Heidelberg. In 1879, it opened another line to Heidelberg, the Neckar Valley Railway, via Neckarelz and Eberbach. Jagstfeld was a border station with customs facilities.

The station building was located on an island between the tracks of the two countries' railway companies: on the eastern side were the rail facilities for the Württemberg Railways lines to Heilbronn and Stuttgart and to Osterburken and Würzburg. On the western side trains were the facilities of the Baden Railway, serving trains running either on the Neckar line towards Neckarelz and or via a western curve in the northern track field—this layout continues today—on to the Elzenz Valley Railway and running over a bridge over the Neckar and continuing down the valley before turning to the west. Both lines come together again in Neckargemünd.

In the 19th century in addition to the common station building, the station had a freight and engine sheds for both the Baden and Württemberg railways as well as a hall for the transfer of goods between the two railway companies and a carriage shed for the Baden Railway. In addition, there were living quarters for the officials of both railways.

From 1907 the station was the terminus of the private branch line to Neuenstadt am Kocher, which was extended to Ohrberg in 1913. The owner and operator, the Württemberg Railway Company (Württembergischen Eisenbahn-Gesellschaft, WEG) initially had its own platform and tracks, opposite the station building, which it connected to by a pedestrian bridge. There was a connecting track for the transfer of freight wagons to and from the Württemberg Railway.

With the merger of the state railways into the Deutsche Reichsbahn in 1920, the station lost its function as a border station. The town of Jagstfeld merged with the neighbouring town of Bad Friedrich in 1933 and the station was renamed with its current hyphenated name.

The 1957 a DrS60 interlocking became operational at Jagstfeld station.

The station has been integrated in the Heilbronner Hohenloher Haller Nahverkehr (H3NV) fare-setting body since 1997. A transitional fare is offered by Verkehrsverbund Rhein-Neckar (VRN) toward Heidelberg.

In January 2013 it was announced that the town of Bad Friedrichshall would buy the station from Deutsche Bahn.

At the 2014/2015 timetable change on 14 December 2014, the northern branch of the Heilbronn Stadtbahn was opened and services were shown as running from central Heilbronn via Neckarsulm and Bad Friedrichshall to Mosbach-Neckarelz and Sinsheim (Elsenz). In fact, the connection of the trains to Sinsheim was not possible until mid-2015 because of delays to the renovation of a bridge in Bad Wimpfen. Until then, the S42 services only ran between Heilbronn, Neckarsulm and Bad Friedrichshal. At the same time the Bad Friedrich-Jagstfeld station was renamed Bad Friedrichshall Hauptbahnhof and from the station category was raised from 4 to 3.

== Reception building ==
The first station building was completed in 1867 and was a typical design of Carl Julius Abel, the engineer for the Heilbronn–Jagstfeld line. The building was built of stone on the ground floor and brick on the upper floors and consisted of two parts. The north part was a mixture of two and half and three story sections. Its ground floor was reserved for the railway personnel of both states. The southern part was much narrower with a two-storey central block, which included the waiting rooms. The station building was destroyed in the Second World War.

The current station was completed in 1955 on the site of the WEG platform to a design of Emil Schuh, who also designed the Heilbronn Hauptbahnhof of 1958. The trains of the Lower Kocher Valley Railway used the Deutsche Bundesbahn station after its opening. The new station building was built next to federal highway 27, which was rebuilt at the same time as an elevated structure. The three building complex is made up of two main building and a long single storey hall connecting them. The north building has a monumental portico as the public entrance to the station. It includes baggage handling. The southern building has three floors with the ground floor space being used for restaurants and the upper floors for apartments.

== Railway operations ==
The station is served exclusively by regional services. Since December 2014 it has also been served by lines S41 and S42 of the Heilbronn Stadtbahn.

| Service type | Route | Frequency |
|---|---|---|
| RB 8 | Würzburg – Osterburken – Bad Friedrichshall Hbf – Heilbronn – Stuttgart | Every 60 mins |
| RE 10a | Mannheim – Heidelberg – Eberbach – Mosbach-Neckarelz – Bad Friedrichshall Hbf – Heilbronn | Every 120 mins (alternating with RE 10b) |
| RE 10b | Mannheim – Heidelberg –Meckesheim–Sinsheim (Elsenz)–Bad Friedrichshall Hbf–Heilbronn | Every 120 mins (alternating with RE 10a) |
| MEX 18 | Osterburken – Möckmühl – Bad Friedrichshall Hbf – Heilbronn – (Stuttgart – Tübingen) | Every 60 mins |
| S 41 | Heilbronn Hbf/Willy-Brandt-Platz–Heilbronn Harmonie–Technisches Schulzentrum–Heilbronn Kaufland–Neckarsulm–Bad Friedrichshall Hbf–Mosbach-Neckarelz–Mosbach (Baden) | Every 60 mins |
| S 42 | Heilbronn Hbf/Willy-Brandt-Platz–Heilbronn Harmonie–Technisches Schulzentrum–Heilbronn Kaufland–Neckarsulm–Bad Friedrichshall Hbf–Bad Wimpfen–Bad Rappenau–Steinsfurt–Sinsheim (Elsenz) Hbf | Every 30 mins |
