= Mosbach-Neckarelz station =

Railway station in Germany

Mosbach-Neckarelz
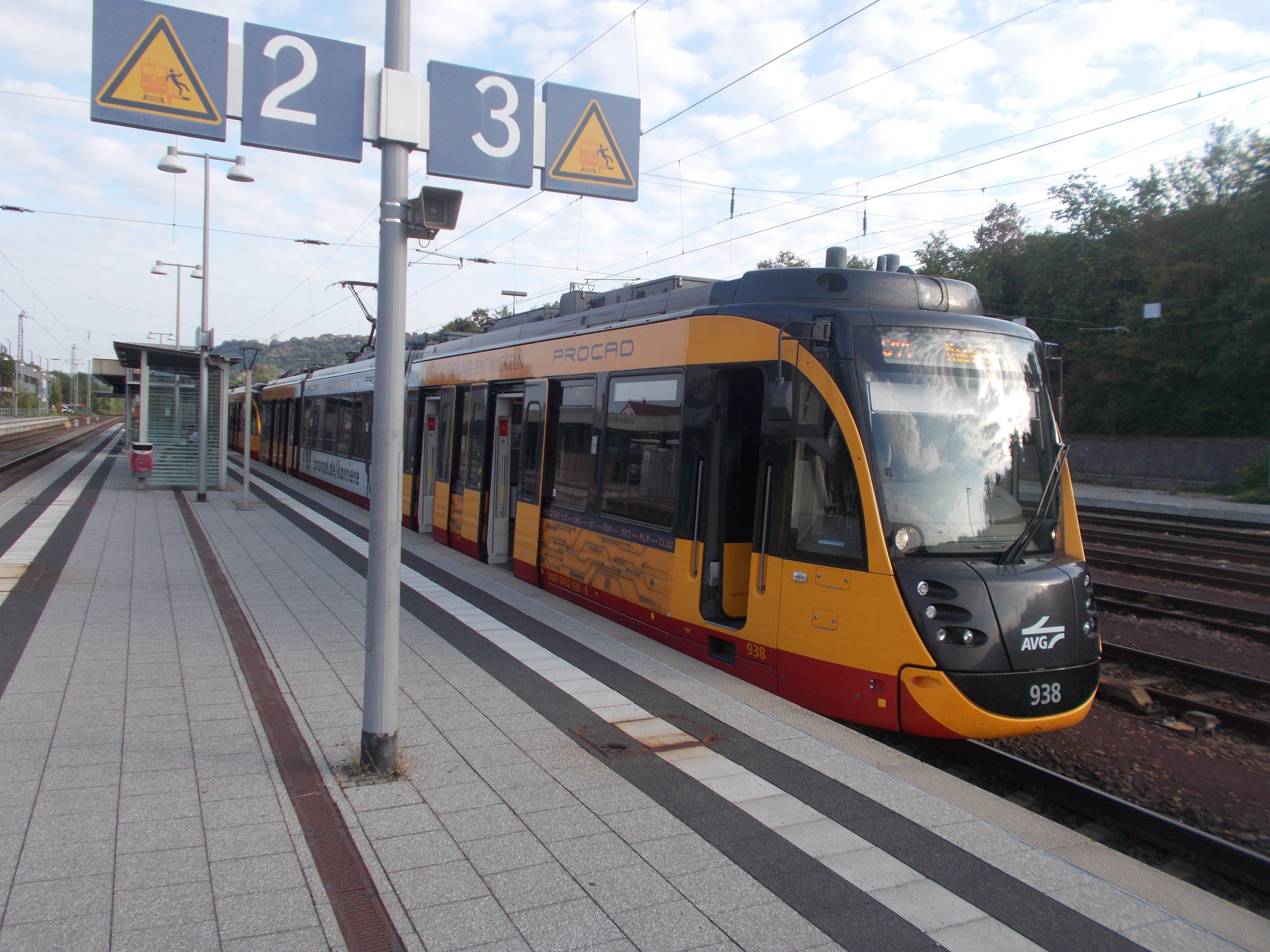
- 2018

General information
- Location: Bahnhofsplatz 1; 74821 Neckarelz; Baden-Württemberg; Germany
- Coordinates: 49.34876°N 9.11288°E
- Elevation: 154 m (505 ft)
- Owner: Deutsche Bahn
- Operator: DB Netz; DB Station&Service
- Lines: Neckar Valley Railway (KBS 665.1–2); Neckarelz–Osterburken railway (KBS 665.1-2)
- Platforms: 2 island platforms
- Tracks: 10
- Train operators: SWEG Bahn Stuttgart; Heilbronn Stadtbahn; Rhine-Neckar S-Bahn
- Connections: S 41

Construction
- Parking: Yes
- Cycle facilities: Yes
- Accessible: Yes

Other information
- Station code: 4316
- DS100 code: RNZ
- IBNR: 8000264
- Category: 3
- Fare zone: VRN: 267, 268, and 271; HNV: 409 (VRN transitional tariff)
- Website: www.bahnhof.de

Services
Preceding station	(Stuttgart)	Following station
Eberbach towards Mannheim Hbf	RE 10a	Bad Friedrichshall Hbf towards Heilbronn
Preceding station	Rhine-Neckar S-Bahn	Following station
Binau towards Homburg (Saar) Hbf	S1	Mosbach West towards Osterburken
Binau towards Kaiserslautern Hbf	S2	Mosbach West towards Mosbach (Baden)
Preceding station	Heilbronn Stadtbahn	Following station
Reverses direction	S 41	Mosbach West towards Mosbach (Baden)
Reverses direction	S 41	Neckarzimmern towards Heilbronn Hbf
Location
- Location within Baden-Württemberg Location within Germany Location within Europe

Mosbach-Neckarelz station is a railway station in the Neckarelz district of the municipality of Mosbach, located in the Neckar-Odenwald-Kreis in Baden-Württemberg, Germany.

Railway map of Mosbach and surroundings
