= Bad Rappenau station =

German railway station

Bad Rappenau
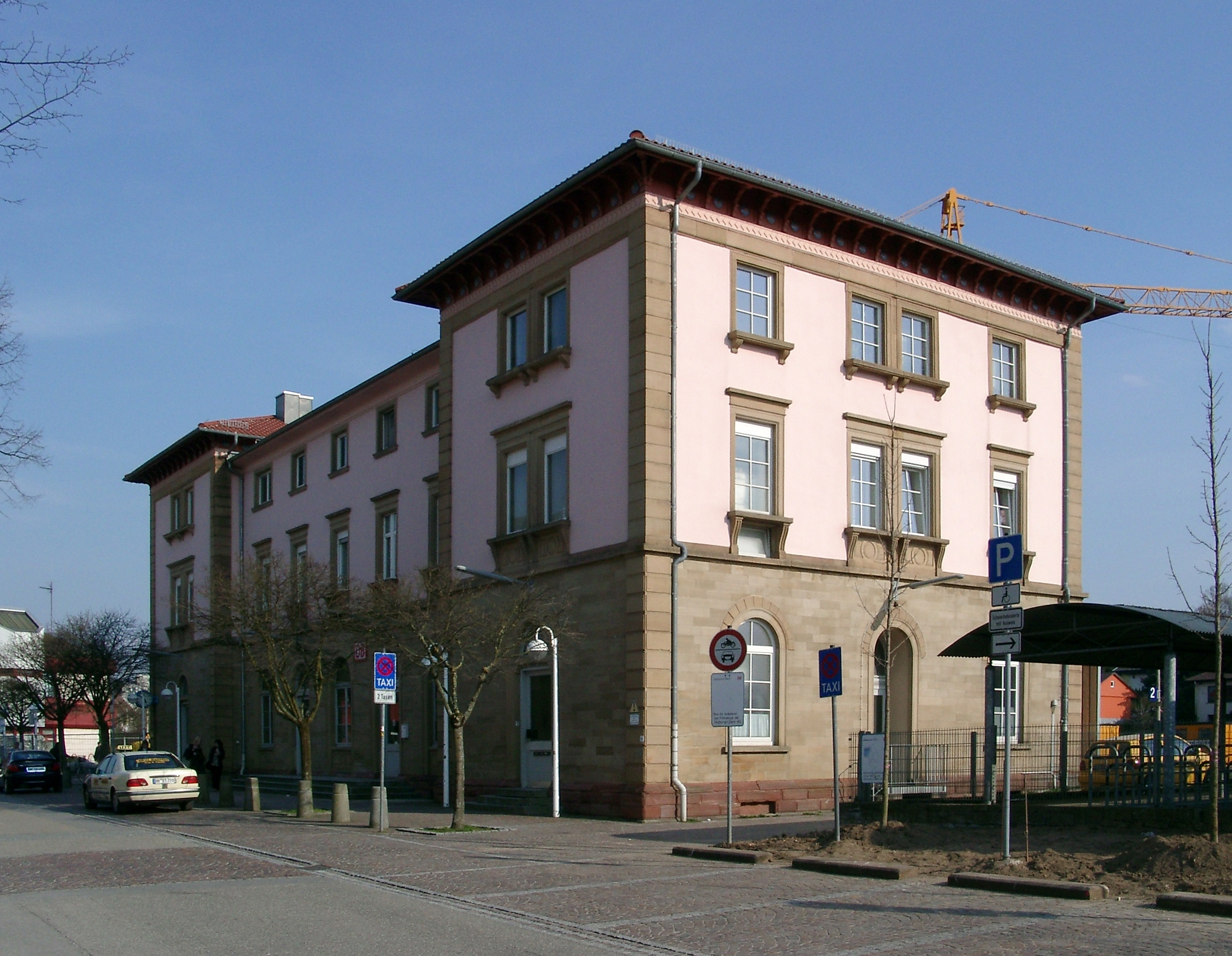
- Station building

General information
- Location: Bahnhofstraße 5, Bad Rappenau, Baden-Württemberg; Germany
- Coordinates: 49°14′16″N 9°06′03″E
- Owner: Deutsche Bahn
- Operator: DB Netz; DB Station&Service
- Line: Elsenz Valley Railway (km 27.9)
- Platforms: 3

Construction
- Accessible: Yes

Other information
- Station code: 320
- DS100 code: RBRA
- IBNR: 8000736
- Category: 5
- Fare zone: HNV: 150; VRN: 217 (HNV transitional tariff, select tickets only)
- Website: www.bahnhof.de

History
- Opened: 25 June 1868
- Former names: Rappenau

Services
Preceding station	(Stuttgart)	Following station
Steinsfurt towards Mannheim Hbf	RE 10b	Bad Wimpfen towards Heilbronn
Preceding station	Rhine-Neckar S-Bahn	Following station
Babstadt towards Heidelberg Hbf	S5	Terminus
Preceding station	Heilbronn Stadtbahn	Following station
Babstadt towards Sinsheim (Elsenz) Hbf	S 42	Bad Rappenau Kurpark towards Heilbronn Hbf
Location

Bad Rappenau station is the station of Bad Rappenau, a spa town in the German state of Baden-Württemberg. It is located at kilometre 27.9 on the Elsenz Valley Railway (Elsenztalbahn) or Neckargemünd–Bad Friedrichshall railway and is classified by Deutsche Bahn as a category 5 station.

== Location ==
Bad Rappenau station is located in centre of the spa town. The otherwise single track Elsenz Valley Railway has three tracks in the station area. The address of the station is Bahnhofstraße 5.

== History ==
=== Opening of Rappenau station ===
The Neckargemünd–Meckenheim section of the Neckargemünd–Sinsheim–Bad Friedrichshall line was opened on 23 October 1862 by the Grand Duchy of Baden State Railway (Großherzoglich Badische Staatseisenbahnen) as part of the Odenwald Railway from Heidelberg to Mosbach and Würzburg. The section from Meckenheim to Bad Rappenau followed on 25 June 1868. Unlike the neighbouring Bad Wimpfen station, Bad Rappenau station originally had no Bad prefix and was called Rappenau station. The closing of the Bad Rappenau–Jagstfeld (Bad Friedrichshall) gap on 5 August 1869 completed the Elsenz Valley Railway.

=== Other development ===
After the municipality of Rappenau was designated as a spa town in 1903 (entitling it to the prefix of "Bad"), Rappenau station was officially renamed Bad Rappenau in 1914. In an order of the Baden Ministry of 4 September 1930, the municipality was renamed from Rappenau (Bezirksamt Sinsheim) to Bad Rappenau with effect from 1 October 1930—about 15 years after the renaming of the station.

=== Station upgrade and inclusion in the Heilbronn Stadtbahn ===
As part of the expansion of Heilbronn Stadtbahn northern branch, the Bad Rappenau–Bad Friedrichshall section was closed for upgrading between 7 January 2014 and 1 May 2015. At the same time, Bad Rappenau station was upgraded to make it accessible for the disabled and given a third platform track. The new Bad Rappenau Kurpark station, which is located next to the Bad Rappenau Kurpark (spa park), was also built for the Stadtbahn.

== Entrance building ==
Bad Rappenau station's entrance building is a neoclassical building from around the period of railway's construction in 1868. It now houses the Bahnhofsgalerie ("Station gallery"), which includes a small flower shop, a Schmitt&Hahn bookshop, a customer centre of the AOK health insurance company and a bakery.

== Transport services ==
Bad Rappenau is in the area where fares are set by the Heilbronner Hohenloher Haller Nahverkehr GmbH (HNV) transport association. Passengers can also use transitional fares set by the Verkehrsverbund Rhein-Neckar (VRN).

=== Passenger services ===
Bad Rappenau is located on the Elsenz Valley Railway, running from Bad Friedrichshall via Sinsheim to Heidelberg. RE 10b Regional-Express services coming from Mannheim Hauptbahnhof and S42 Stadtbahn services coming from Bad Friedrichshall normally cross here.

Regionalbahn service RB 74 ran hourly between Sinsheim, Bad Rappenau, Bad Wimpfen and Bad Friedrichshall (some to/from Heilbronn) until the closure of the line in early January 2014. Since the reopening of the line on 1 May 2015, Bad Rappenau has been served by line S42 of the Heilbronn Stadtbahn.

Until early January 2014, the Regional-Express service RE 2 ran between Mannheim, Heidelberg, Sinsheim and Heilbronn every two hours. From the timetable change on 15 December 2019, SWEG Bahn Stuttgart (then Abellio Rail Baden-Württemberg) have operated the RE traffic on the Mannheim–Heilbronn route with the lines renamed at that time RE 10a (via Eberbach) and RE 10b. The lines are operated with Bombardier Talent 2.5 electric multiple units.
