= Elsenz Valley Railway =

Railway line in Germany

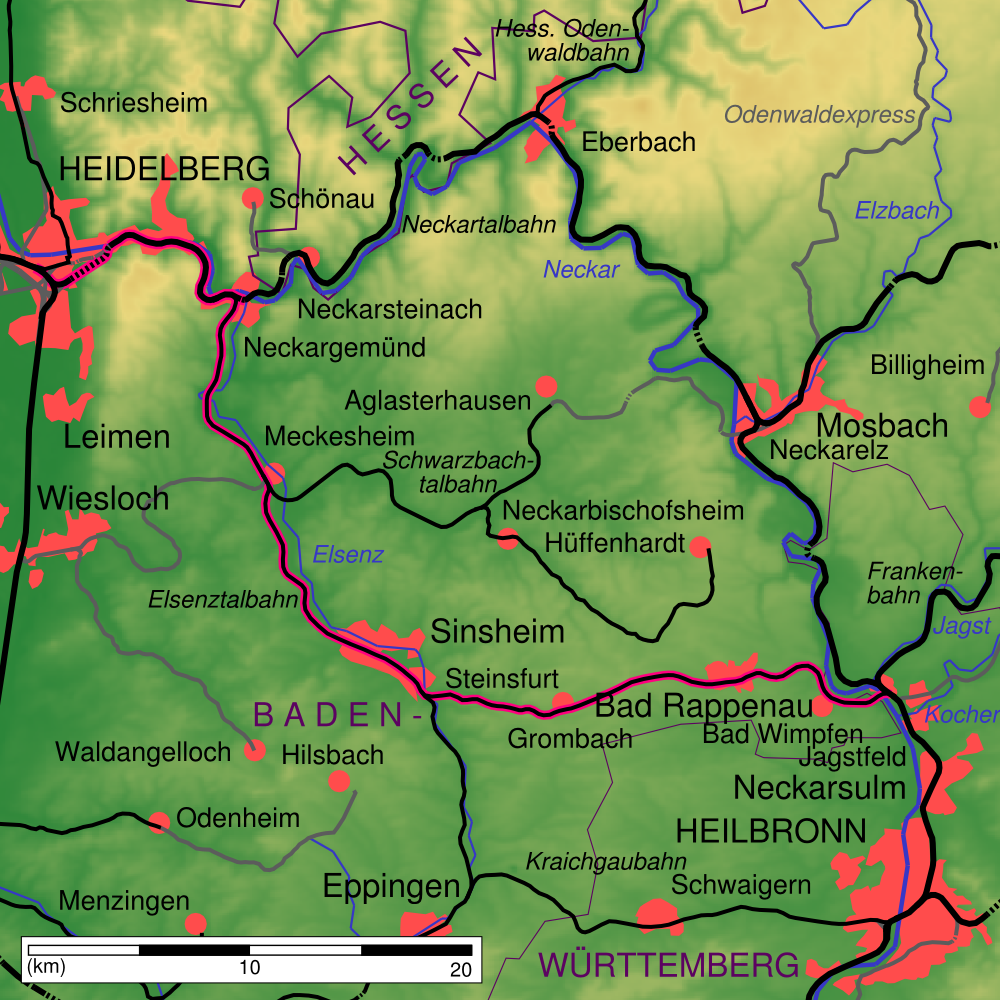

Overview
- Native name: Elsenztalbahn
- Line number: 4110 (Neckargemünd–Meckesheim); 4114 (Meckesheim–Bad Fr’hall)
- Locale: Baden-Württemberg, Germany
- Termini: Neckargemünd; Bad Friedrichshall

Service
- Route number: 665.5/710.41

Technical
- Line length: 46.4 km (28.8 mi)
- Track gauge: 1,435 mm (4 ft 8 1/2 in) standard gauge
- Minimum radius: 300 m (980 ft)
- Electrification: 15 kV/16.7 Hz AC overhead
- Operating speed: 120 km/h (75 mph)
- Maximum incline: ca. 2.2%

The Elsenz Valley Railway (Elsenztalbahn) or Neckargemünd–Bad Friedrichshall railway is an electrified, partly double-tracked main line in the German state of Baden-Württemberg, running from Heidelberg via Sinsheim to Bad Friedrichshall, that, for part of its course, follows the Elsenz river that gives it its name. The crossing stations on the single-tracked sections were controlled by mechanical signal boxes until 2008, but are now controlled by electronic interlockings.

The section from Heidelberg to Meckesheim was opened on 23 October 1862 by the Grand Duchy of Baden State Railway as part of the Odenwald Railway and is one of the oldest railways in Germany. The section from Meckesheim to Bad Rappenau was opened by the Baden State Railway on 25 June 1868 and it was extended to Bad Friedrichshall-Jagstfeld on 5 August 1869.

The line has been electrified to allow the extension of the Rhine-Neckar S-Bahn on the Heidelberg–Steinsfurt section of the line and the operation of Heilbronn Stadtbahn on the section between Sinsheim and Bad Friedrichshall-Jagstfeld.

== History ==
=== Construction from Heidelberg to Meckesheim ===
At the end of the 1840s, the Kingdom of Württemberg wanted to connect its railway lines with those of Grand Duchy of Baden, from Heilbronn via Sinsheim either to Wiesloch or Heidelberg. Baden did not agree to support this proposal, however, as it only wanted a line via Pforzheim.

A railway committee was founded in Mosbach for the construction of an Odenwald Railway on 24 May 1853 and another one was founded in Heidelberg in 1856 . As part of this process, it was determined on 27 April 1860 that the section from Heidelberg via Meckesheim to Mosbach would be built at government expense. After preparatory work that had been in progress since 1858, construction subsequently commenced. The line was initially built as a single track, but it was prepared for eventual doubling. The inaugural train trip took place on 22 October 1862 in very poor weather. On the following day operations by the Grand Duchy of Baden State Railways were recorded on the line. There was a derailment on the first day of operations on the Neckar bridge at Neckarelz due to a landslide as a result of heavy rain.

=== Construction from Meckesheim to Jagstfeld ===
A line from Waibstadt to the Rappenau salt works (Saline Rappenau) was planned. A petition was presented against this in 1862 by the town of Sinsheim and 25 other municipalities, which instead sought a line from Meckesheim via Sinsheim to Rappenau. The latter followed by an extension to Jagstfeld was approved on 19 January 1866.

The opening trip on the section from Meckesheim to Bad Rappenau took place on 18 June 1868 with regular services commencing on 25 June. There were initially two viaducts on this section, three bridges, 14 level crossing keepers houses and 36 level crossings. The connecting line to the salt works had been put into operation in April.

The second track from Heidelberg Karlstor to Meckesheim was opened in mid 1869, because with the lines to Bavaria and Württemberg significantly more trains would run on this section.

It was opened to Jagstfeld on 5 August 1869.

=== 20th century ===
Between 1920 and 1930, the line was upgraded for higher axle loads.

In the Second World War, on 2 February 1945, the Neckar bridge between Bad Wimpfen and Jagstfeld was severely damaged by bombs and as a result the line from the 35.52 kilometre point was abandoned in 1952. The halt of Bad Wimpfen Neckarbrücke was built as a workaround near a ferry to the other side of the Neckar, not far from Jagstfeld station, on 5 October 1947. In November 1952, operations resumed over a new bridge.

The level crossing at km 17.050, to the west of Mauer, (now the street of Im Bruchrain) was closed in about 1959. The level crossing at km 16.0 (at that time guard post 19), south of the village of Bammental, received a protection system with flashing lights for the first time in 1964, whereupon the local crossing keeper's house was demolished. The level crossing at km 1.6 (guard post 1a), between Meckesheim and Zuzenhausen, was closed in 1965 as a result of the construction of the Meckesheim bypass. The level crossing over Horrenberger Straße in Zuzenhausen (guard post 3a) receives a locomotive-monitored flashing light system on 6 June 1969. Sometime before 1976, the level crossing at km 18.2 (guard post 21a, Hartmann Company) in Mauer was closed. The guard post 17a level crossing near Bammental station closed in 1978.

Two years after the last sugar beet was loaded in Meckesheim; loading ended in Bammental (72 wagons) in 1979 and in Grombach (424 wagons; 11,047 tonnes) in 1980. The last beet was loaded in Babstadt (ca. 100 wagons) in 1984 and in Sinsheim (212 wagons), Steinsfurt (153 wagons) and Hoffenheim (99 wagons) in 1991.

In 1980, the railway overpass over district road 4162 at Waldhilsbach was upgraded.

On 1 August 1981, guard post 25 in Bad Rappenau was abolished.

The Neckargemünd–Meckesheim line was renewed in August 2003 and the Meckesheim–Neckargemünd line was renewed in August 2006. The line from Grombach to Bad Rappenau was closed from 3 to 30 August 2006. The Meckesheim–Sinsheim line was renewed from May to June and in August 2007.

=== Development ===
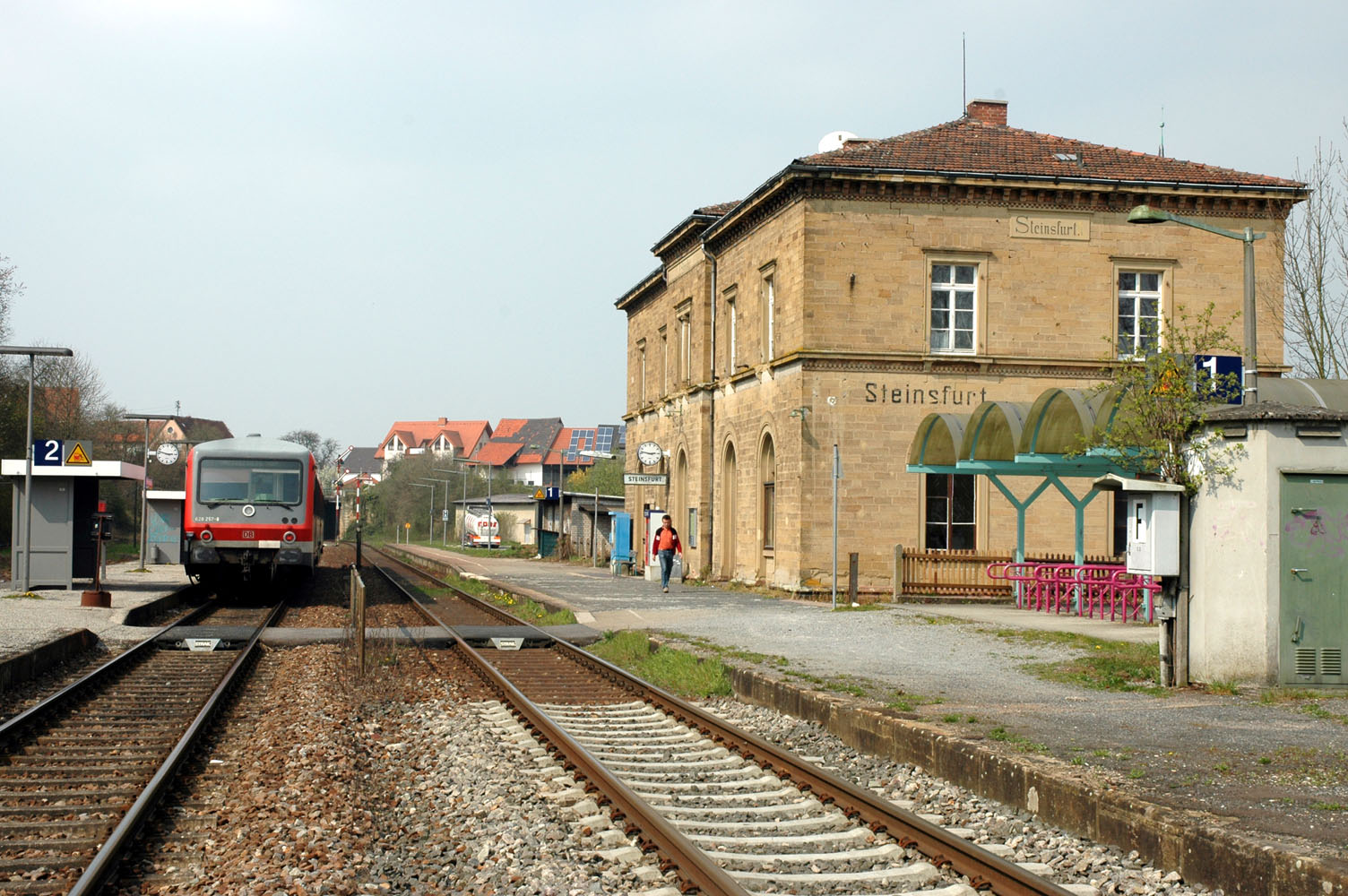
Regionalbahn service to Heidelberg in Steinsfurt (April 2007) before the electrification

From March 2008, the track was modernised for the extension of the adjacent S-Bahn networks. A project entitled "Electrification and expansion of the transport infrastructure on the Elsenz Valley Railway and the Schwarzbach Valley Railway", included, in addition to the electrification, the reconstruction or conversion of all platforms and the modernisation of the stations from Neckargemünd to meet the standards of the Rhine Neckar S-Bahn, including, among other things, bringing platform heights to 76 centimetres. The upgrade was divided into the following sections:

1. Neckargemünd – Meckesheim
2. Meckesheim – Sinsheim-Steinsfurt – Eppingen
3. Meckesheim – Aglasterhausen

Parallel with the line upgrade, the Elsenztal electronic interlocking was put into operation from 24 October until 1 November 2008. This now remotely controls the entire line, along with the branches to Aglasterhausen and Eppingen, via the signalling computers at Waibstadt, Sinsheim, Grombach and Bad Rappenau and is operated by the Meckesheim 1 (up to and including Sinsheim Hbf) and Meckesheim 2 dispatchers at the Karlsruhe operation centre. The monitoring of the two remote-controlled level crossings in Mauer and south of Reilsheim was transferred to the electronic interlocking on 3 February 2009.

Construction of the Meckesheim substation to the north of Meckesheim on the Mannheim–Neckarelz traction power line, from which the newly electrified lines are supplied, began on 5 November 2008.

The electrification began in the autumn of 2009. The first electric train ran on 6 November 2009.

Before its conversion for the S-Bahn, platform track 3 in Steinsfurt station, including the single track Elsenz bridge, was demolished.

A little later, the halt of Sinsheim Museum/Arena was rebuilt as a double-track station to allow trains to cross, with work completed on 12 June 2011, and reclassified as a part of Steinsfurt station for administrative purposes. A new track 3 was built there before the level crossing as a siding and terminal track without access to a platform. As a result of this layout, special football trains run directly from the Museum/Arena area to be shunted in the siding or run from the Sinsheim Museum/Arena station.

In December 2012, a retaining wall collapsed at Bad Wimpfen, causing this section of the line to be closed for three months.

As part of the development of the northern line of the Heilbronn Stadtbahn, the whole Bad Rappenau – Bad Friedrichshall section was blockaded in the period from 7 January 2014 to 30 March 2015. On weekends and holidays, no trains served Steinsfurt and Bad Rappenau. During this construction work, Bad Wimpfen station was converted into a double-track station where trains could cross and the bridge over the L530 was rebuilt with two tracks. At the same time, the new halts of Bad Rappenau Kurpark and Bad Wimpfen im Tal were created.

== Operations ==
=== Passengers ===
==== 19th century ====
Around 1893, local train services were extended from Heidelberg to Neckargemünd to Meckesheim, which ran between Neckargemünd and Meckesheim about once an hour a train. These stopped, in addition to the places served by the other trains, at the halts of Heidelberg Peterskirche, Jägerhaus-Wolfsbrunnen, Kümmerlbacher Hof, Waldhilsbach and Reilsheim that were established at the same time. One of these trains continued from Heidelberg to Wiesloch-Walldorf station.

==== 20th century ====
After Bruchsal station, the local tunnels, the Enz viaduct in Bietigheim and all the Neckar bridges were destroyed during World War II, all trains operating from Mannheim to Stuttgart from April to August 1945, including up to 80 freight trains per day, ran via Meckesheim, Eppingen provisional station (now the Stebbach part of Eppingen station) and Heilbronn-Böckingen (Franconia Railway). Until the reconstruction of the Neckar bridge in Neckargemünd in 1946, trains from Mannheim to Würzburg also took a corresponding route. From July 1945, "milk trains" ran from Mannheim to Obrigheim, Bad Rappenau and Eppingen; from August, express, semi-fast and general freight could also be carried on these trains.

In the mid-1950s, the steam trains were superseded by railcars of the VT 95 and VT 98 classes (similar to Uerdingen railbuses). The line was served by, along with eight pairs of trains running over the whole line and another pair reversing in Neckargemünd, some of which did not stop in Waldhilsbach and Reilsheim, six train pairs to Obrigheim, two train pairs from Heilbronn to Bad Rappenau and one semi-fast train pair on both the Heidelberg–Stuttgart and the Cologne–Darmstadt–Heidelberg–Stuttgart routes, and the trains of the line to Eppingen between Sinsheim and Steinsfurt.

The last steam train ran from Mannheim on 24 December 1972 and steam trains stopped running on the line before the timetable change at the end of May 1973.

From the summer of 1973 to 1975, there were through coaches from Paris to Heilbronn, which formed part of the semi-fast trains 1555 and 1756 on the Elsenz Valley Railway.

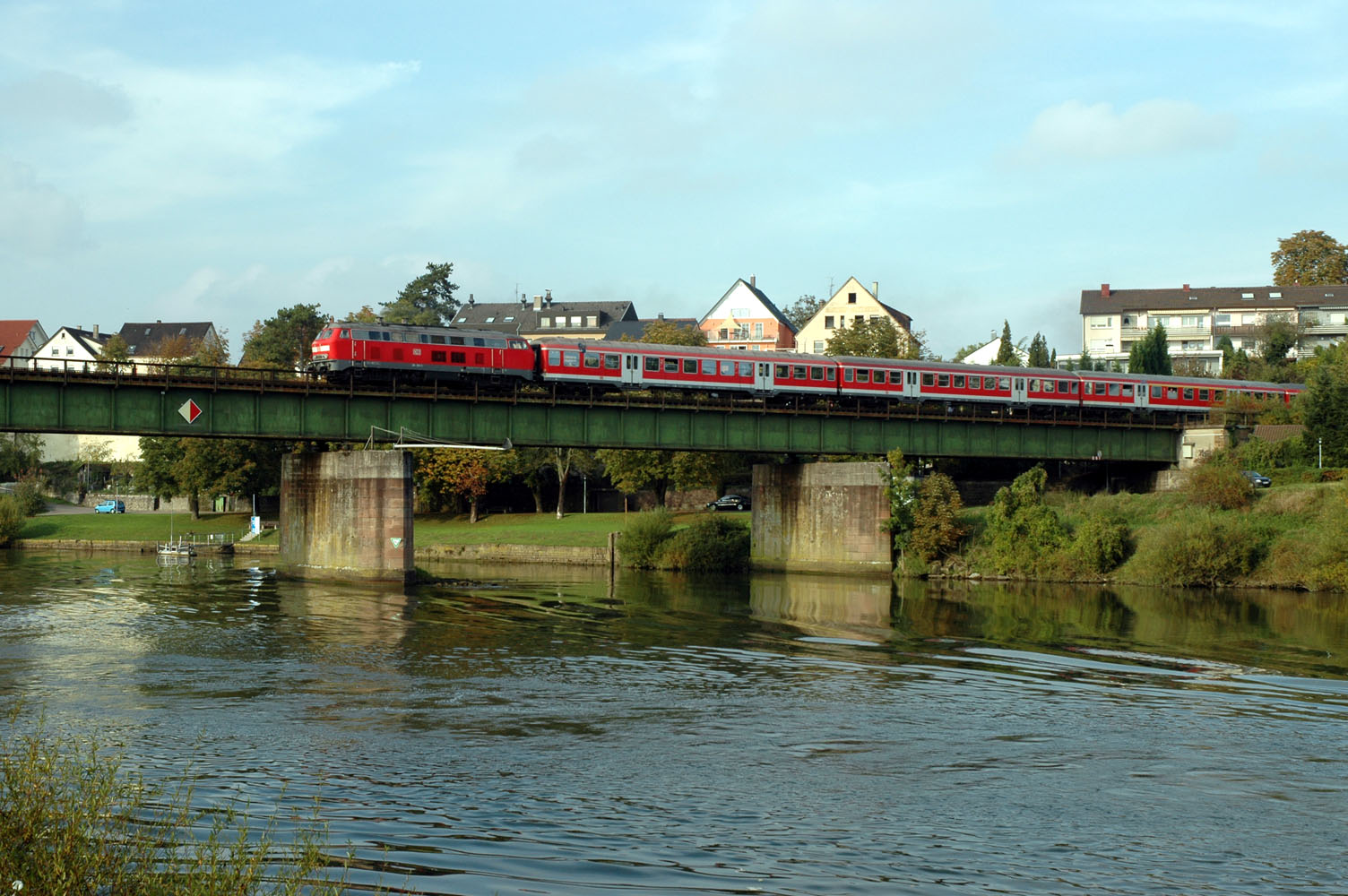
RE 4840 to Mannheim on the Neckar bridge in Bad Friedrichshall-Jagstfeld, 2007

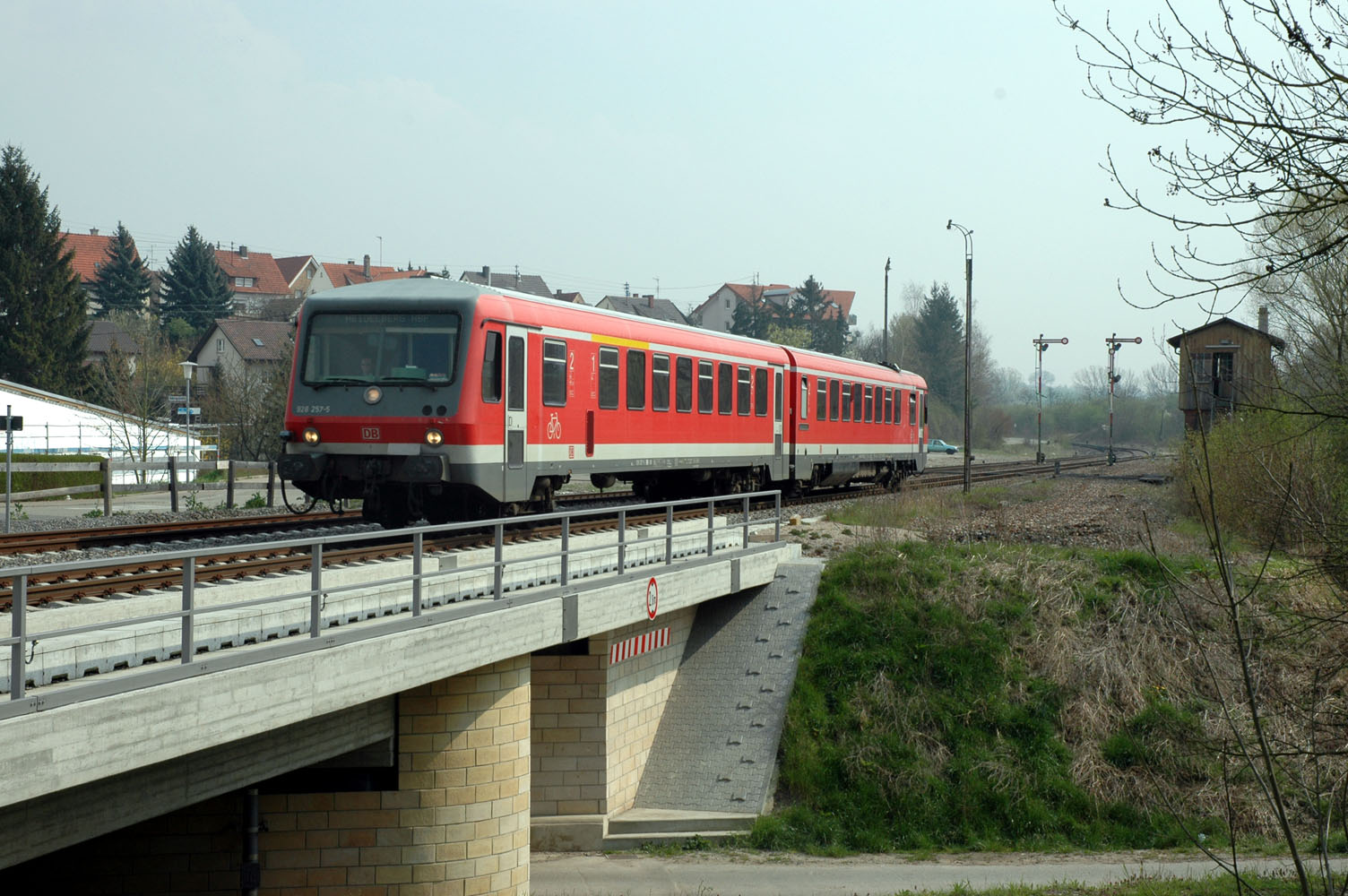
RB 18332 from Eppingen to Heidelberg in Steinsfurt, 2007

At the end of 1988, a clock-face timetable was introduced on the line. After the electrification of the line, Regional-Express services were operated with Silberling coaches and diesel locomotives of class 218 and many Regionalbahn services were operated with class 628 diesel multiple units. Initially, individual local trains were operated by the SWEG with class NE 81 diesel multiple units. At the timetable change in June 1997, services running later at night were introduced and the last train from Heidelberg to Sinsheim then ran around 22:12. From 28 September 1997, Regional-Express services were operated with class 611 diesel multiple units, which shortened travel times as a result of their tilting technology. Due to technical faults, however, this use did not last long.

After the timetable change in December 1999, the Regionalbahn services also ran on Sundays and public holidays every hour instead of every two hours.

Before the establishment of the S-Bahn, the Regional-Express services were similar to the current operations. The Regionalbahn services from Heidelberg to Sinsheim ran hourly in 2008, in the afternoon five additional services ran towards Sinsheim producing a half-hourly service. The Regionalbahn services took about three minutes longer to cross the Neckargemünd – Sinsheim section than today's S-Bahn service and the Sinsheim – Bad Friedrichshall section took four to six minutes longer. The last trains reached Sinsheim already shortly after 10 pm instead of about 1 am, while the first trains ran at a similar time. The Regionalbahn services continued to run on the even hours to Bad Friedrichshall-Jagstfeld and on the odd hours to Eppingen, so every two hours on each branch.

The Regionalbahn connection towards Mannheim, Speyer and Bruchsal was cancelled in 2003 with the introduction of the Rhine-Neckar S-Bahn.

Shortly before the modernisation of the line, more than 100 regular services were operated with historic rolling stock, including five steam locomotives, over a five-day period at the Plandampf-Veranstaltung ("scheduled steam event"), Über’n Buckel ("over the hump").

==== S-Bahn period ====
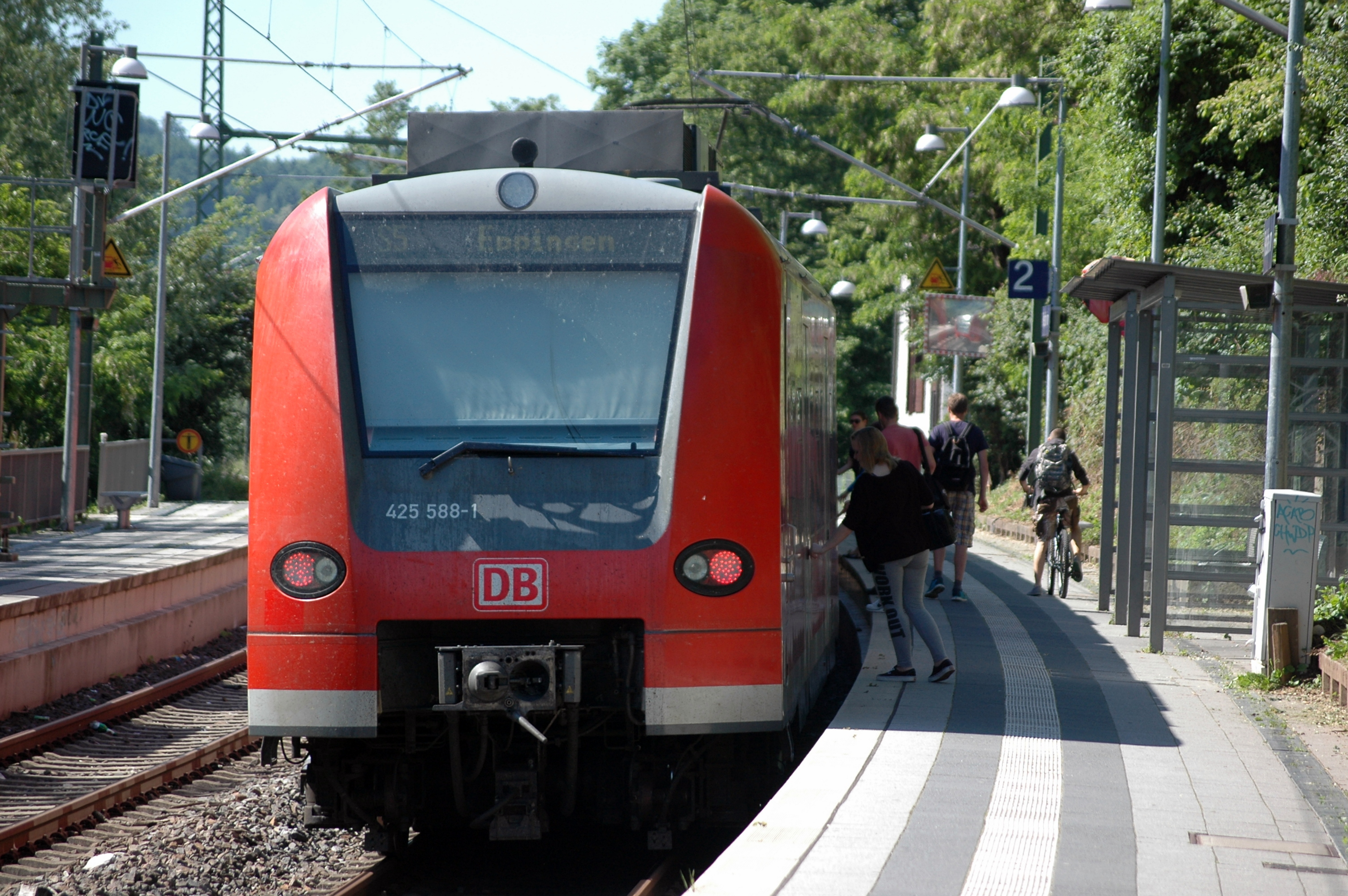
S5 38529 to Eppingen in Reilsheim

Since December 2009, S5 services of the Rhine-Neckar S-Bahn have run hourly between Neckargemünd and Steinsfurt in normal times and every half hour in the peak to Sinsheim. Some trains continue as RB44 services to/from Mainz.

The line S51 service, which runs from Meckesheim to Aglasterhausen, also run hourly on the Heidelberg – Meckesheim section on weekdays. The superimposition of lines S5 and S51 services results in a half-hourly service on the Heidelberg – Meckesheim section. In the peak hour both S-Bahn services on the Meckesheim – Aglasterhausen and the Heidelberg – Sinsheim sections operate every half-hour, but are worked as portions on the Heidelberg – Meckesheim section, so they still only run every half-hour on that section.

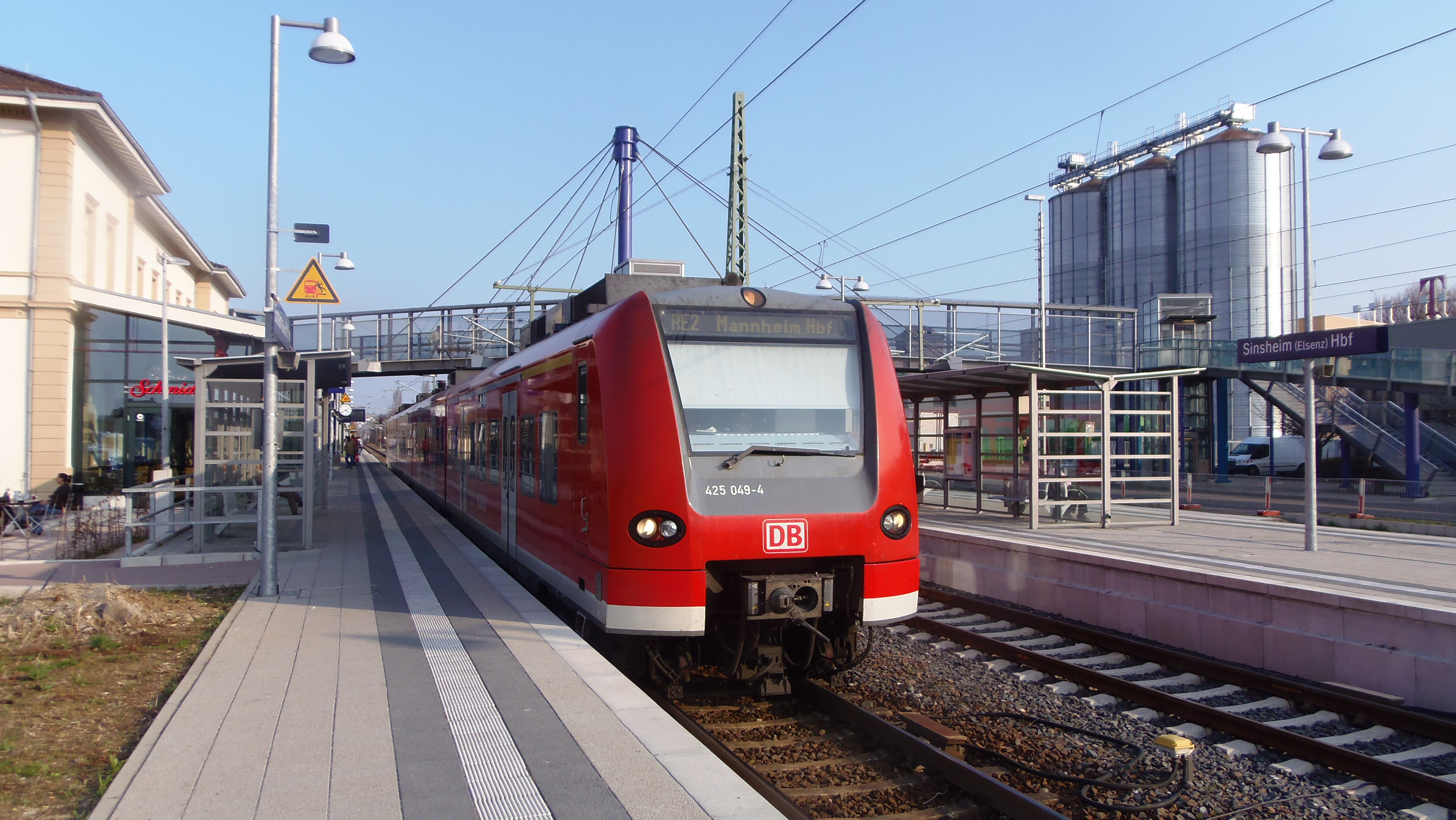
RE 28290 to Mannheim in Sinsheim

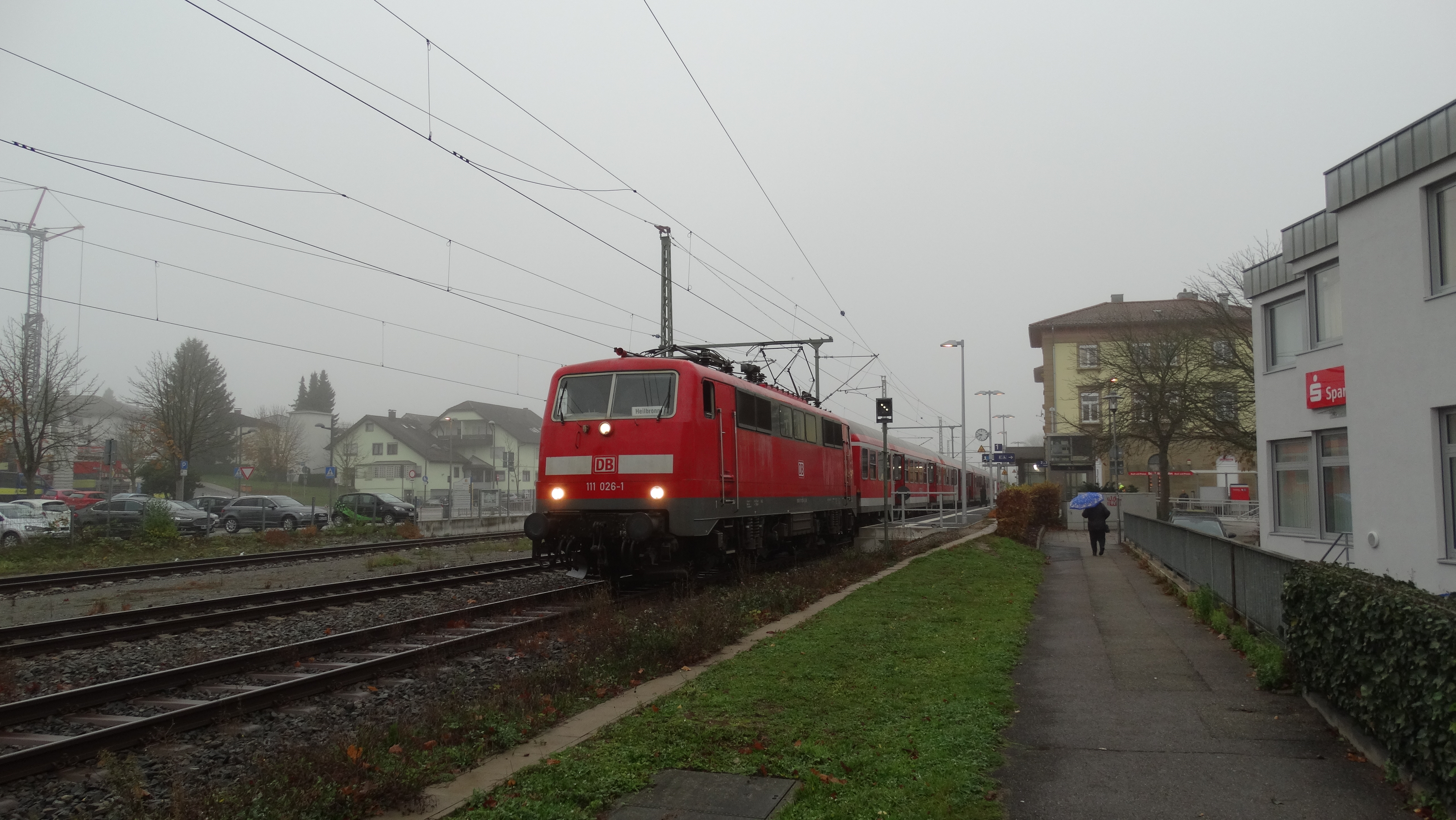
Some RE services were operated in 2017 with sets formed of class 111 locomotives and Silberling coaches, here RE 12303 in Bad Rappenau

The Regional-Express 2 service from Mannheim to Heilbronn also run every two hours over the track, stopping in Meckesheim, Sinsheim, Bad Rappenau and Bad Friedrichshall-Jagstfeld. Together with the RE 3 service (RE 1 until 2014) through the Neckar valley, it forms an hourly clock-face service between the two end points. Both the S-Bahn and the Regional-Express services consist of class 425 electric multiple units. Until September 2016, individual RE 2 services continued during the peak hour and at the weekend as the RB 10 service to/from Stuttgart. Until 10 December 2017, some Regional-Expresses services consisted of a class 111 locomotive and five Silberling coaches.

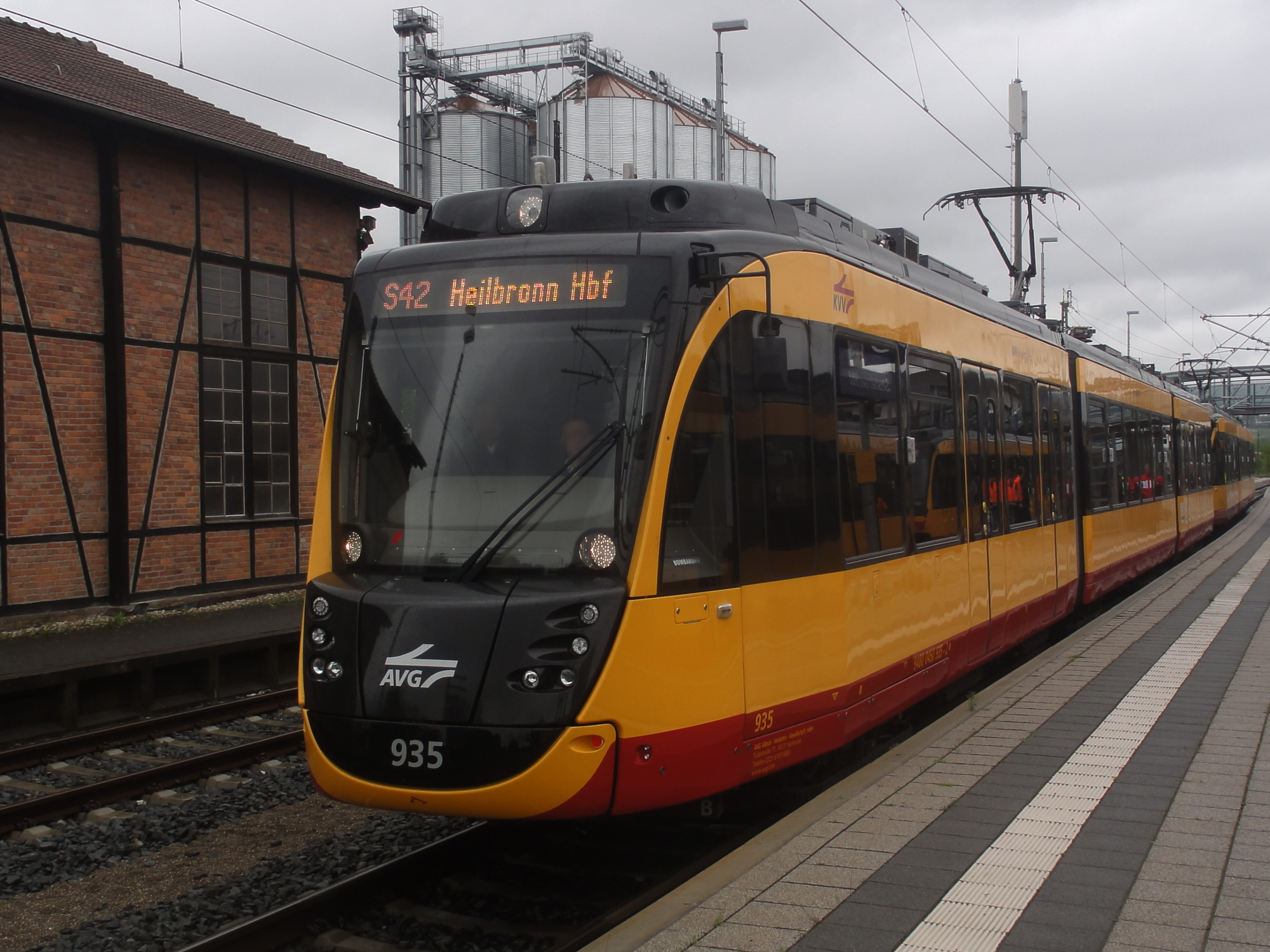
S42 85797 to Heilbronn in Sinsheim

Furthermore, the S 42 service of the Heilbronn Stadtbahn runs on the line with two-system Stadtbahn sets of the ET 2010 class. This leaves every two hours from the Heilbronn inner city via Neckarsulm, Bad Friedrichshall Hbf and Bad Rappenau to Sinsheim Hbf and, once an hour, from Heilbronn to Bad Rappenau.

===== Passenger services since 2009 =====
A special service was operated for the opening of the S-Bahn line on 13 December 2009 with a historic ET25 set. In the early years, diesel multiple units were used for some services due to a lack of rolling stock.

Up to December 2014, the RB 74 Regionalbahn service ran from Sinsheim to Bad Friedrichshall (some continuing to Heilbronn) every hour. In January 2014, since the Regionalbahn service would have now only run between Sinsheim and Bad Rappenau, a combined RB74/S5 service was established, which ran from Bad Rappenau to Heidelberg.

In the autumn of 2013, the Regional-Express service, which normally runs on the Neckar Valley Railway, was diverted over the Elsenz Valley Railway due to construction work. Thus, at this time one RE service ran each direction every hour, although the additional trains could not stop in Meckesheim because of lack of line capacity.

The Bad Rappenau–Bad Friedrichshall section was closed for construction from 7 January 2014 until 30 April 2015. At this time a rail replacement bus service ran between Bad Rappenau and Neckarsulm, which was extended to Sinsheim on weekends. During the construction period, the Regional-Express services ran over the Neckar Valley Railway.

On 14 December 2014, the RB 74 service was replaced by the S 42 service of the Heilbronn Stadtbahn, although it was replaced by a rail replacement bus service until 1 May 2015 between Bad Rappenau and Neckarsulm and it was subsequently operated under a coordinated transition timetable, since the bridge in Bad Wimpfen had not yet been completed.

Since the timetable change in December 2016, the AVG Stadtbahn services, which had previously ended in Grombach, have been extended as far as Sinsheim, after the municipality of Bad Rappenau criticised the "unspeakable" interchange situation in Grombach. The municipality did not want to contribute to the operating costs without these timetable improvements; it was also concerned that no passenger survey had been taken place one and a half years after the start of operations. The municipality of Bad Rappenau would have had to pay €190,000 for operations in 2015.

Since December 2016, the hourly S 5 services have stopped in Heidelberg-Schlierbach/Ziegelhausen and Heidelberg Orthopädie. As a result of the division of the S-Bahn network into various lots for the re-tendering of operations, S 5 services no longer continue to Kaiserslautern as line S 2 on Sundays and public holidays.

In the long term, the S 5 service will run through as the S 6 service to Mainz. However, this requires an increase in line capacity between Heidelberg and Mannheim, which is currently not funded.

===== Susceptibility to delays =====
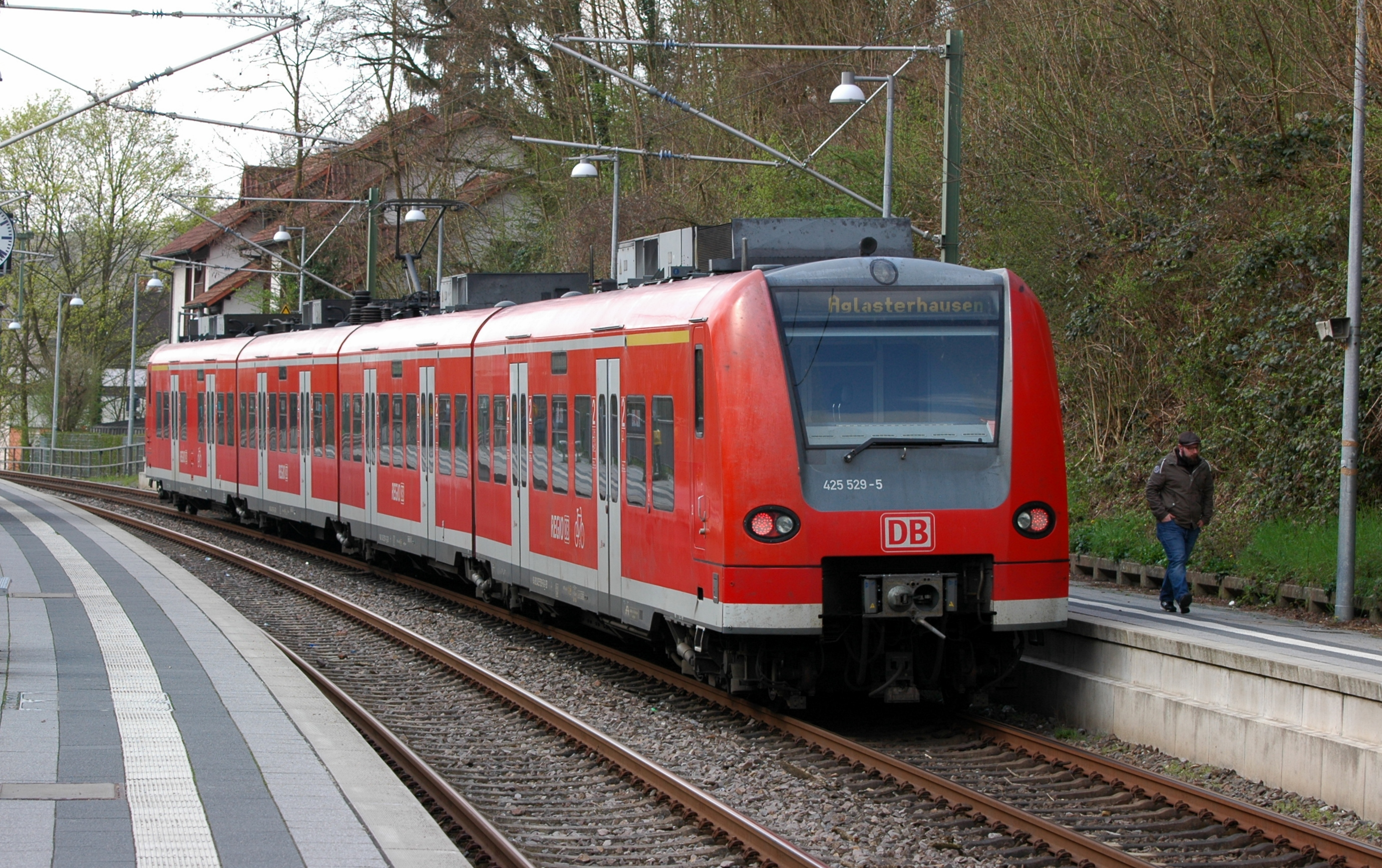
S51 38533 running ten minutes late in Reilsheim in 2014

Due to the short turnaround times, especially in Eppingen, the need to maintain connections in Eppingen and the single-track sections, where slight delays might force the relocation of train crossings to Meckesheim, causing greater delays, a punctual operation was possible only without external disturbances. The introduction of the northern line of the Heilbronn Stadtbahn and construction work for the S-Bahn network increased disturbances, which reduced punctuality and trains were often terminated in Steinsfurt or Neckargemünd.

In order to reduce these effects, lengthened turning times were added to the timetable at Heidelberg Hbf. As a further attempt to reduce the delays since 2016, four trains are scheduled to leave Eppingen ten minutes later, so in those cases the train crossings are transferred to Hoffenheim; it was hoped that the departure in Eppingen would not be delayed by late AVG trains and thus on their return they would arrive on time to Eppingen. Since the introduction of this deviation from the clock-face timetable, premature turns have no longer been necessary.

The Ministry of Transport considers the installation of a second track of the Meckesheim–Steinsfurt section to be necessary in the medium term. However, there are no plans for this, although implementation would take decades.

=== Freight ===
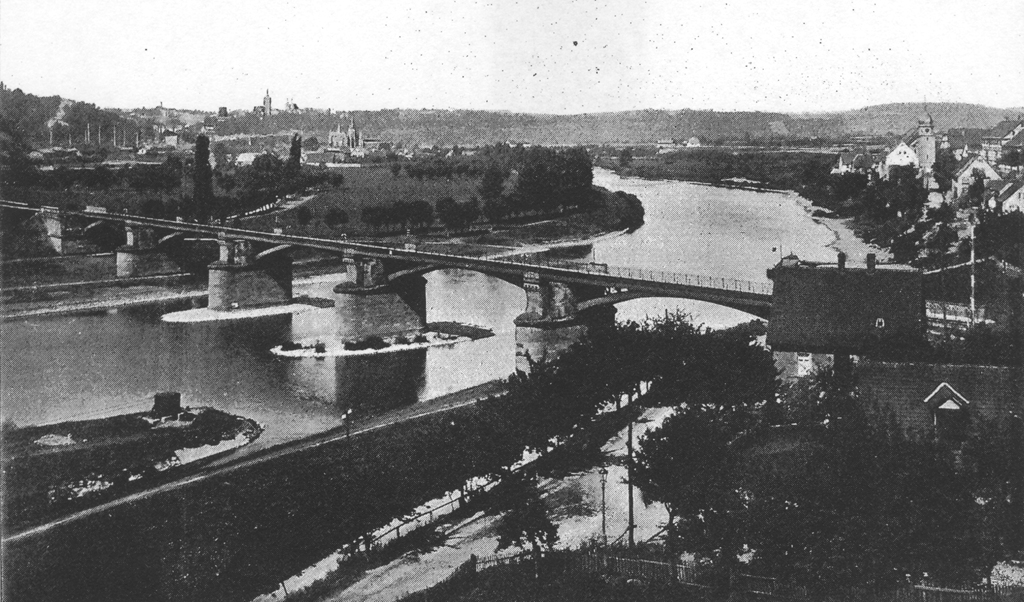
Bridge over the Neckar between Bad Wimpfen and Bad Friedrichshall-Jagstfeld (1907)

As part of the MORA C concept (Market-oriented offer for Cargo), the last freight operations at Meckesheim were abandoned on 31 December 2001, but, until 2009, freight wagons that were loaded on the Schwarzbach Valley Railway and the Krebsbach Valley Railway carried timber to Mannheim twice a week. Since the upgrade of the line for S-Bahn operations, as a result of which only 3 tracks are available in Meckesheim, and the provisional closing of the Krebsbach Valley Railway in 2009, these timber trains no longer run. Freight trains regularly run from Heilbronn to the Bad Wimpfen Solvay chemical works.

There is no regular freight traffic over the whole line, since the line is in contrast to the Neckar Valley Railway partly only single-track and has less favourable gradients.

In exceptional cases freight trains with high loads that cannot run over other lines are routed over the line.
