= Stadtwerke Heilbronn =

Stadtwerke Heilbronn GmbH
- Founded: 2002
- Key people: Tilo Elser and Torsten Briegel
- Services: Public utilities
- Revenue: €32 m (2011)
- Number of employees: 303 (2011)
- Website: www.stadtwerke-heilbronn.de

Stadtwerke Heilbronn GmbH was founded in 2002 by the city of Heilbronn.

Stadtwerke Heilbronn (Heilbronn city works) manages and operate the Am Bollwerksturmund Experimenta parking garage, the Soleo and Biberach indoor pools, the Neckarhalde, Gesundbrunnen and Kirchhausen swimming pools and the Knorr Arena ice rink, the home of the Heilbronner Falken. They also operate the Old Waterworks (Alte Wasserwerk, a heritage site) and the Heilbronn industrial and port railway (Industrie- und Hafenbahn Heilbronn) in Heilbronn’s port and the Neckar industrial area.

== Heilbronn Transport ==
Heilbronn Transport (Verkehrsbetriebe Heilbronn) operates a city bus network of eleven routes in the city of Heilbronn and the municipality of Flein and the Heilbronn Stadtbahn in the city centre. The transport company was created in 1940 from the former Heilbronner Straßenbahn AG (Heilbronn tramway), which was responsible for trams in Heilbronn from 1897 to 1955. It also operated the Heilbronn trolleybus line (Oberleitungsbus Heilbronn) from 1951 to 1960.

== Investments ==
The sole shareholder of Stadtwerke Heilbronn is the city of Heilbronn. Stadtwerke is the sole shareholder of the Beteiligungsgesellschaft Stadt Heilbronn mbH (City Heilbronn holding company) and owns 74.9% of Heilbronner Versorgungs GmbH. The remaining 25.1% is held by EnBW.
