= Sinsheim (Elsenz) Hauptbahnhof =

Station on the Neckargemünd–Bad Friedrichshall-Jagstfeld railway

Sinsheim (Elsenz) Hbf
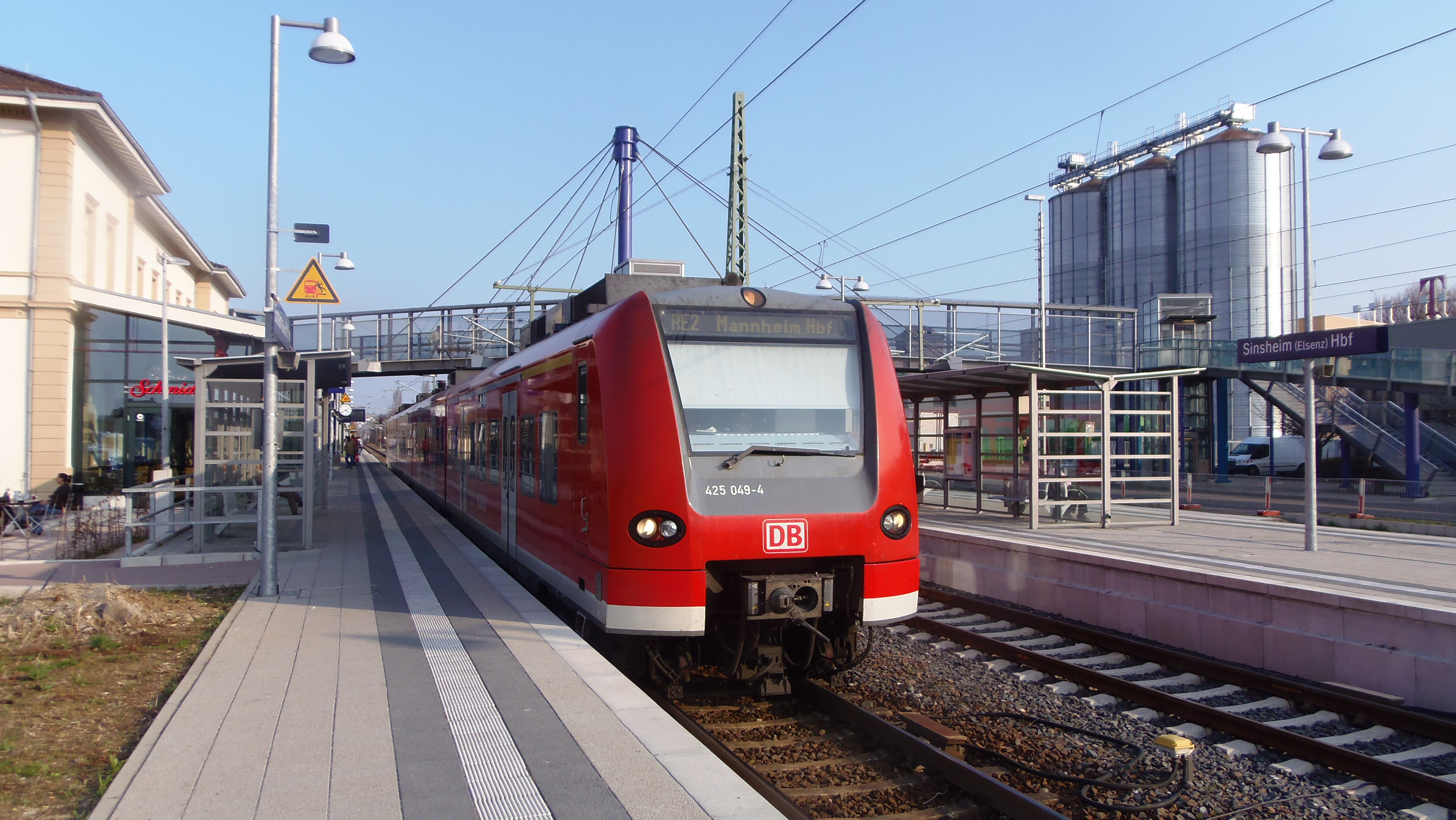
- Station with class 425 EMU

General information
- Location: Friedrichstr. 25, Sinsheim, Baden-Württemberg; Germany
- Coordinates: 49°15′02″N 8°52′29″E
- System: Through station
- Owner: Deutsche Bahn
- Operator: DB Netz; DB Station&Service
- Line: Neckargemünd–Bad Friedrichshall-Jagstfeld
- Platforms: 3
- Connections: 741 755 761 763 765 767 768 771 772 796 797 799 899

Construction
- Accessible: Yes

Other information
- Station code: 5870
- DS100 code: RSM
- IBNR: 8005578
- Category: 4
- Fare zone: VRN: 186; HNV: 401 (VRN transitional tariff)
- Website: www.bahnhof.de

History
- Opened: 1868

Services
Preceding station	(Stuttgart)	Following station
Meckesheim towards Mannheim Hbf	RE 10b	Bad Rappenau towards Heilbronn
Preceding station	Rhine-Neckar S-Bahn	Following station
Hoffenheim towards Heidelberg Hbf	S5	Sinsheim Museum/Arena towards Eppingen or Bad Rappenau
Preceding station	Heilbronn Stadtbahn	Following station
Terminus	S 42	Sinsheim Museum/Arena towards Heilbronn Hbf
Location

Sinsheim (Elsenz) Hauptbahnhof — called Sinsheim (Elsenz) station until 2010 — is a station on the Neckargemünd–Bad Friedrichshall-Jagstfeld railway in the German state of Baden-Württemberg. The station falls within the area of the Verkehrsverbund Rhein-Neckar (Transport association of Rhine-Neckar) and is an important station in the Kraichgau. In the area of the city of Sinsheim, there are also stations (all called Haltepunkte in German, "halts") at Hoffenheim, Sinsheim Museum/Arena, Steinsfurt and Reihen.

== History ==
The station was opened in 1868 to coincide with the opening of the Meckenheim–Rappenau section of the Neckargemünd–Bad Friedrichshall-Jagstfeld railway of the Grand Duchy of Baden State Railways. The station building was built in 1867/68. It was designed in the Weinbrenner style by a student of the architect Friedrich Weinbrenner. The building, including its ground and upper storey, is listed as a cultural monument by the state of Baden-Württemberg.

The station facilities had been expanded by 1900 with an overpass over Dührener Straße (street).

In 2009, the town of Sinsheim began to renovate the entrance building and the surrounding area, including the establishment of a park and ride parking area and the redesign of the bus station. The existing pedestrian zone of the town was extended to the station. Since December 2009, trains on the Rhine-Neckar S-Bahn have stopped at Sinsheim Hauptbahnhof.

The northern line of the Heilbronn Stadtbahn was opened at the 2014/2015 timetable change. Following the construction of the section of line from Bad Rappenau to Bad Friedrichshall between 7 January 2014 and 30 April 2015, the new S42 service was opened between Sinsheim and Bad Rappenau. In the spring of 2015, S42 services were extended from Bad Rappenau to central Heilbronn.

== Station infrastructure ==
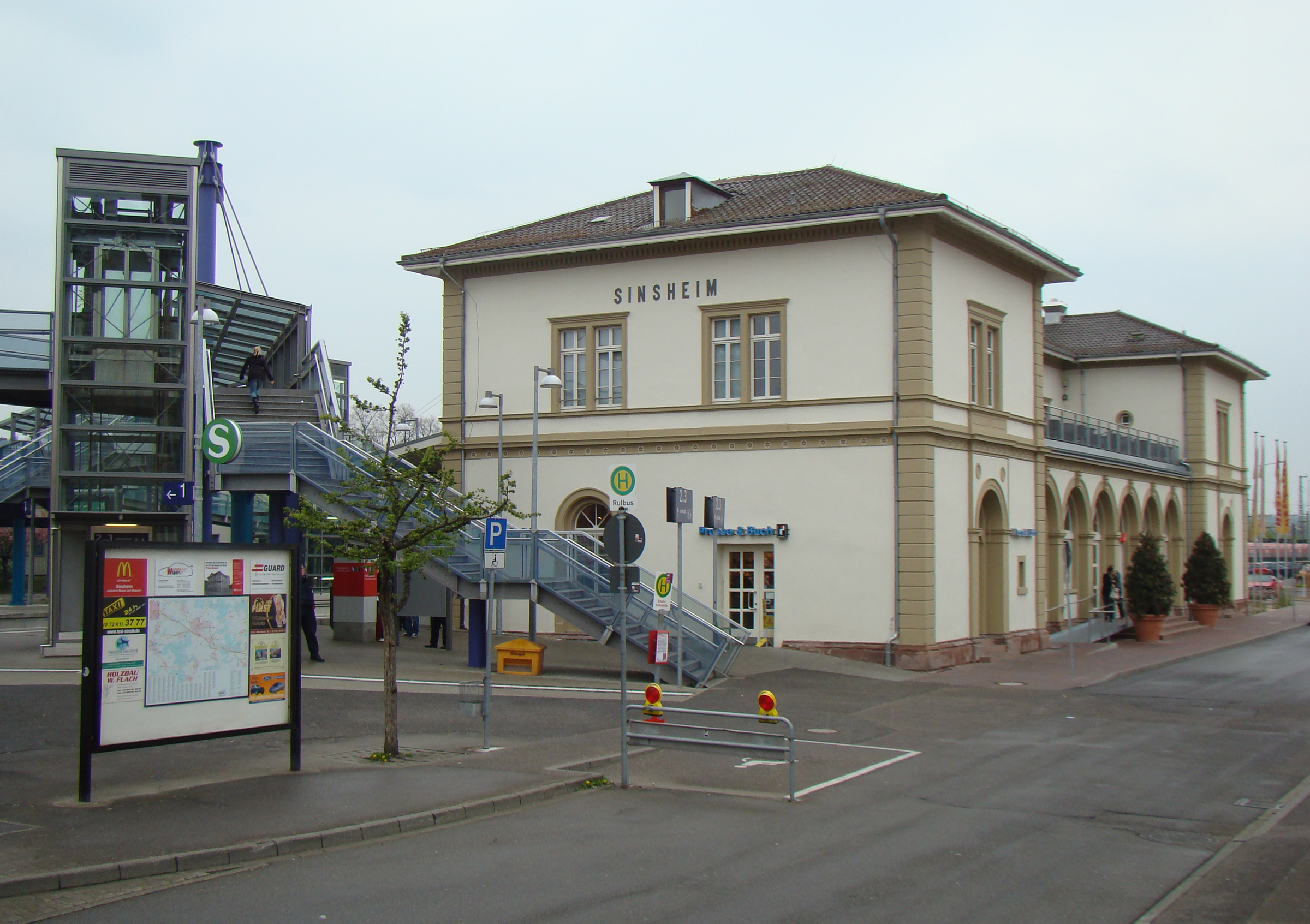
The station building and the stairway to the pedestrian overbridge seen from the south side

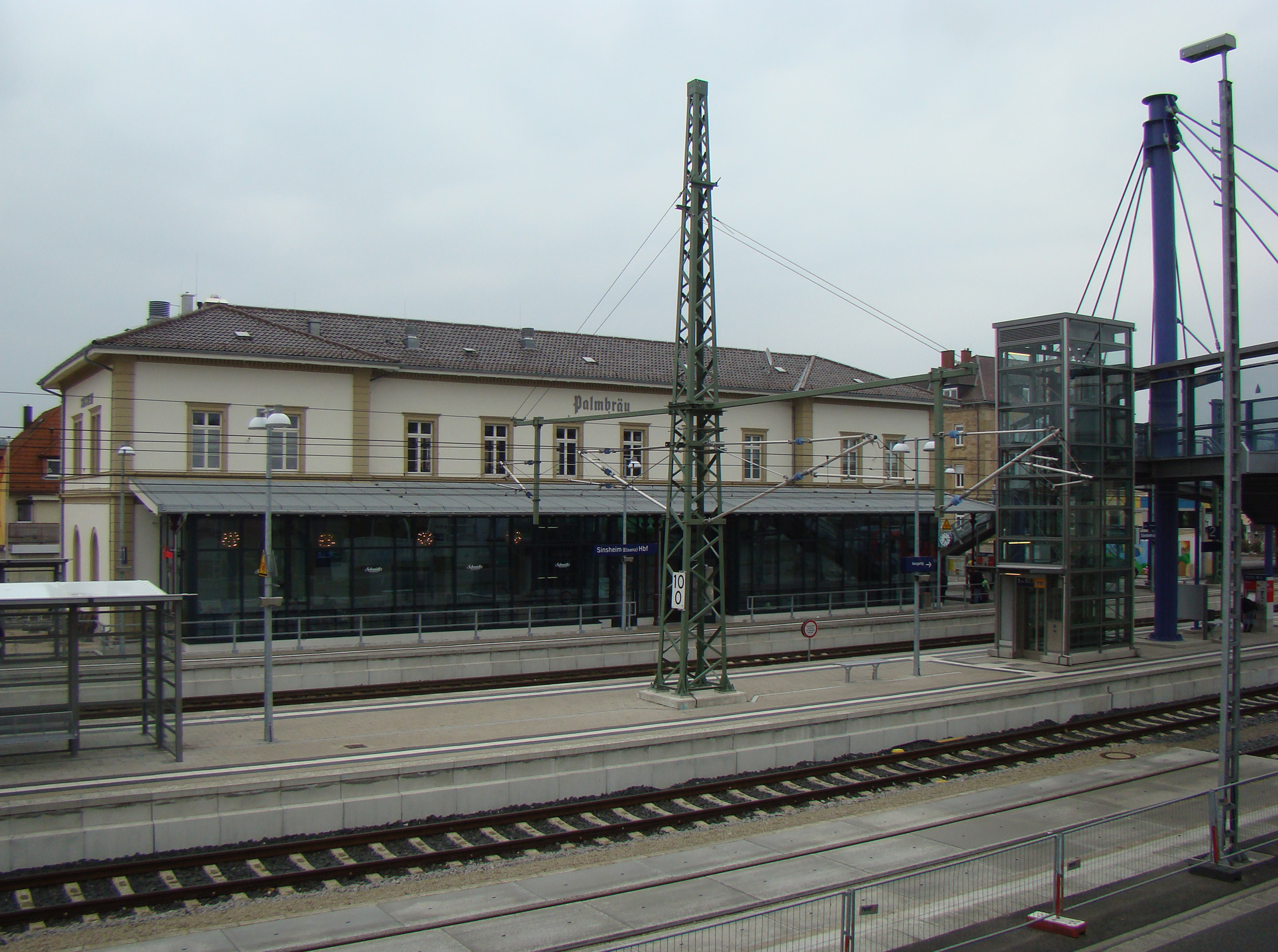
South side of the station building with track field

The station building has a largely symmetrical floor plan centred on an axis extending from the southern end of Bahnhofstraße. The platforms are on the south side of the building. East of the station building is the bus station. The tracks and the street of Jahnstraße to its south are spanned by a footbridge. This was rebuilt during the line's electrification. The station has three platform tracks. Track 1 is located next to the station building and tracks 2 and 3 are on a central platform. South of the tracks is a timber roundhouse, including a turntable. The roundhouse, which, with its stalls for two locomotives, is used by Eisenbahnfreunde Kraichgau (railway friends of the Kraichgau) as its club house, stood in Meckenheim until 1947.

== Rail services ==
The station is served by Regional-Express line RE 10b from Mannheim to Heilbronn, line S5 of the Rhine-Neckar S-Bahn from Heidelberg to Eppingen and line S 42 of the Heilbronn Stadtbahn, which ends in Sinsheim.

The station is next to a bus station, which is served by bus lines 741, 761, 763, 765, 767, 768, 771, 772, 795, 796 and 797 of the PalatinaBus company, which connect to the town of Sinsheim. Shuttle buses to the Rhein-Neckar Arena football stadium, where TSG 1899 Hoffenheim plays its home games, also operate from the bus station.
