= Heilbronn Stadtbahn =

Tram-train system in Germany

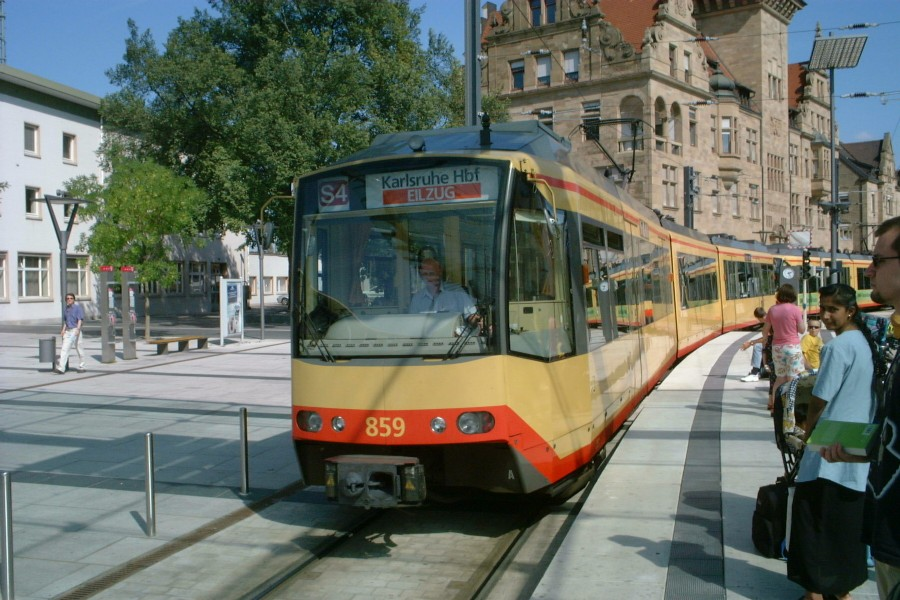
- Stadtbahn vehicle in Bahnhofsvorplatz

Overview
- Locale: Heilbronn, Baden-Württemberg, Germany
- Transit type: Light rail (Stadtbahn)
- Number of lines: 3

Operation
- Began operation: 12 March 1998
- Operators: Albtal-Verkehrs-Gesellschaft, Stadtwerke Heilbronn and Deutsche Bahn

Technical
- Track gauge: 1,435 mm (4 ft 8 1/2 in) (standard gauge)
Heilbronn Stadtbahn network (2015)

East-west line

Overview
- Line number: 7712

Service
- Route number: 710.4

Technical
- Num of tracks: 2 (except Finanzamt–Pfühlpark)
- Track gauge: 1,435 mm (4 ft 8 1/2 in) standard gauge
- Electrification: 15 kV/16.7 Hz AC overhead catenary (until ca. km 0.3); 750 V DC (ca. km 0.3 to ca. km 2.6)
- Operating speed: 80 km/h (49.7 mph) (maximum)

Northern branch

Overview
- Line number: 4914

Service
- Route number: 710.41

Technical
- Line length: 6.0 km (3.7 mi)
- Num of tracks: 2
- Character: (EBO); max. axle load: 22.9t (BOStrab)
- Track gauge: 1,435 mm (4 ft 8 1/2 in) standard gauge
- Minimum radius: 190 m (623 ft) (EBO); 25 m (82 ft) (BOStrab)
- Electrification: 15 kV/16.7 Hz AC overhead catenary (from km 3.90); 750 V DC (until km 3.90)
- Operating speed: 80 km/h (50 mph) (max)
- Maximum incline: BOStrab: 1.998%; EBO: 1.358%

The Heilbronn Stadtbahn is a three line tram-train system in city of Heilbronn in the German state of Baden-Württemberg. It is based on the Karlsruhe model and operated jointly by the Albtal-Verkehrs-Gesellschaft (AVG), the Stadtwerke Heilbronn (SWH) and Deutsche Bahn (DB). It operates on normal railways under the Eisenbahn-Bau- und Betriebsordnung (Ordinance on the Construction and Operation of Railways, EBO) and within Heilbronn under the Verordnung über den Bau und Betrieb der Straßenbahnen (Ordinance on the Construction and Operation of Street Railways, BOStrab).

The oldest line of the system, the S4, was an extension of an existing line that had been operated by the Karlsruhe Stadtbahn since 1992. It was extended in 1999 from Eppingen to Heilbronn and since 2001 it has continued over the new Heilbronn inner-city line (Heilbronner Innenstadtstrecke). In 2005, the line was extended to Öhringen, which is integrated into the Heilbronner Hohenloher Haller Nahverkehr ("Heilbronn Hohenlohe Hall local transport", HNV), a transport association (Verkehrsverbund) that is responsible for coordinating fares and transport investment. In 2013, the new S42 service was opened to Neckarsulm. Since 2014, this service has continued via Bad Friedrichshall to Sinsheim, while the new S41 service also runs via Bad Friedrichshall to Mosbach.

== Network ==
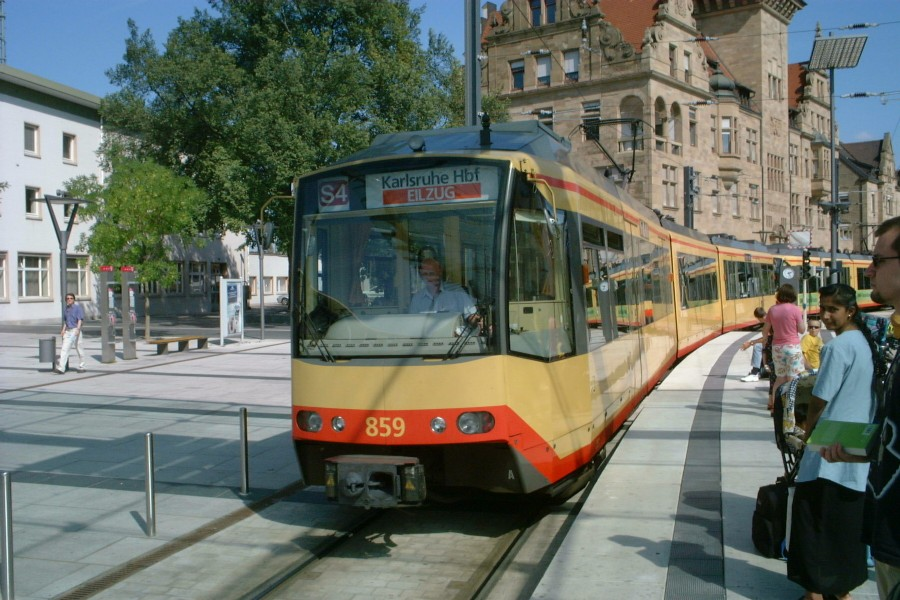
Stadtbahn train in Heilbronn station forecourt

=== Route of east–west line ===
The Stadtbahn trains on the S4 line coming from Karlsruhe enter the area administered by the Heilbronn Stadtbahn in Eppingen and initially run on the route of the Kraichgau Railway (Kraichgaubahn) via Gemmingen, Stetten, Schwaigern and Leingarten. The Kraichgau Railway then traverses the suburb of Böckingen, stopping at the Böckingen West, Berufsschulzentrum and Sonnenbrunnen stops. After the line crosses the bridge over Heilbronn canal harbour, it crosses the tracks of the Franconia Railway (Frankenbahn) on the level. Just before the Heilbronn Hauptbahnhof, the inner city line of the Stadtbahn, which is owned by Stadtwerke Heilbronn (the municipal utility company), branches off. Immediately after the transition from EBO to BOStrab the tracks run in front of the Hauptbahnhof to the Hauptbahnhof/Willy-Brandt-Platz stop; the change in the electrical systems is shortly later. Since the trains briefly coast here, an approximately 100-metre (330 ft)-long section is fitted with both systems. There is a tight squeeze between a dense hedge next to a walkway and the street, which is about a metre higher.

Trains then leave running under DC next to Bahnhofstrasse (station street) to the NeckarTurm am Kurt-Schumacher-Platz stop at its eastern end. In the immediate vicinity is the Experimenta Heilbronn, a science centre. A few metres later the Stadtbahn crosses the Friedrich Ebert bridge over the Neckar. The route now follows Kaiserstraße and in the vicinity of the marketplace is the Rathaus ("town hall") stop. At its eastern end, Kaiserstraße meets the Allee, where the northern branch carrying lines S41 and S42 turns off to the north along the Allee from the original east–west Stadtbahn line. The original line S4 line continues across the wide road axis to the Harmonie stop.

Then the route continues east in the middle of Moltkestraße to Friedensplatz stop, which is well-used by the students of the local high schools, and then changes to the side of street to run to Finanzamt stop. Subsequently, the Stadtbahn runs on the north side of Bismarckstraße and Jägerhausstraße to Pfühlpark stop, beyond which the inner-city line ends. A short ramp then carries the Stadtbahn back to the DB line, which then runs just past Trappensee station and through the Weinberg tunnel. The railway finally reaches Öhringen via Weinsberg, Ellhofen, Obersulm and Bretzfeld.

=== Route of northern branch ===
The northern line branches off from the original east–west Stadtbahn line at the Allee and runs to the north along this broad street. The tracks are laid on the sides of the roadway. Directly to the north of the junction are the Harmonie/Kunsthalle stop on the eastern side of the Allee for north-bound Stadtbahn trains and the Harmonie/Hafenmarktpassage stop on the western side of the Allee for south-bound trains. At the northern end of the Allee, the tracks turn to the left and run in the centre of Weinbergerstraße to the Theater stop. A little later, the Stadtbahn tracks turn right into Paulinenstraße and follow its course to the Technisches Schulzentrum stop. Beyond this stop the tracks pass under the Hohenlohe Railway and the Franconia Railway and continue to run next to Salzstraße to Industrieplatz where they then turn into Austraße and reach the Industrieplatz stop. The tracks leave the middle of Austraße next to the Hans-Riesser-Straße stop. There they swing into Hans-Riesser-Straße (street) and follow it up to its eastern end and continue on to meet the tracks of the Franconia Railway, which they then runs next to. The tracks then passes the Kaufland stop and the Neckarsulm Süd halt, which is located in the municipality of Neckarsulm.

== Operations ==
S4 services now operate in both directions three times an hour between Weinsberg and Schwaigern West and continue once an hour to Karlsruhe. There are also two pairs of "sprinters" that stop only in Heilbronn, Eppingen, Bretten and Karlsruhe-Durlach, which formerly continued once an hour as an express to Achern, but since 2012 have terminated in Karlsruhe. The line between Weinsberg and Öhringen is also served in the peak hour at 20-minute intervals, on Saturdays at alternating 20 and 40 minute intervals and on Sundays every hour. Every two hours throughout the week there is a connection in Öhringen with a Regionalbahn train to Schwäbisch Hall-Hessental and Crailsheim. Approximately 13,400 people are carried on the line between Öhringen and Heilbronn on each working day. This represents a five-fold increase in the number of passengers compared to traffic on the "old Hohenlohe Railway".

The northern branch is served by lines S41 and S42, both starting on the forecourt of the Heilbronn Hauptbahnhof and running to Bad Friedrichshall. From there the S41 services continue to Mosbach and the S42 services continue via Bad Rappenau to Sinsheim. There are connections at both termini to the Rhine-Neckar S-Bahn.

Line S41 runs hourly via Mosbach-Neckarelz to Mosbach (Baden), and an additional hourly S41 shuttle service runs between Mosbach (Baden) and Mosbach-Neckarelz to connect with the RE3 service to/from Heidelberg and Mannheim. Line S42 runs every half hour as far as Grombach, an additional service runs hourly as far as Bad Rappenau and one service continues every two hours to Sinsheim, complementing an RE2 service, also running every two hours.

== History ==
=== East–west line ===
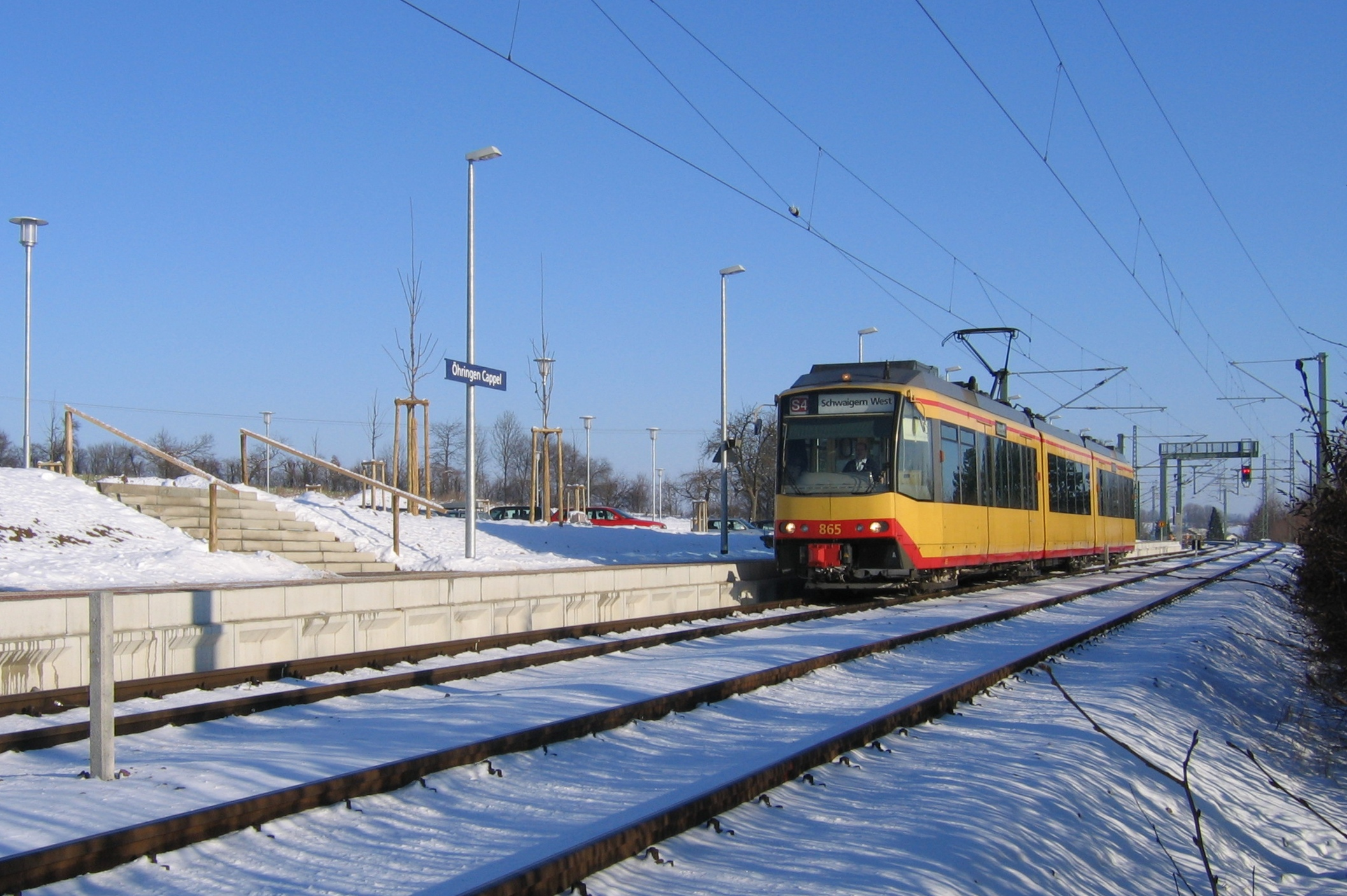
Terminus of the Stadtbahn in Öhringen-Cappel

The introduction of a Stadtbahn network on the Karlsruhe model was first discussed in 1991, over 35 years after the last Heilbronn tram ran. The public transport scheme that was subsequently developed was approved by the Heilbronn council on 6 September 1994. Even then, it was intended that today's S4 line would be the first service put into operation. An important step in this direction was made in June 1997 with the extension of Karlsruhe Stadtbahn line S4 to Eppingen in the western part of the Heilbronn district.

In anticipation of the new Stadtbahn line, tracks were already laid on Kaiserstraße during its reconstruction in 1998. As of 12 March 1998, the Stadtbahn ran between Eppingen and Heilbronn Hauptbahnhof, at first only on weekends, but from 27 September of the same year it ran all week. In parallel, the first section of the inner-city route to Harmonie was designed. Construction work on the track began in June 2000. The first test train ran on the track on 4 June 2001 and services commenced on 21 June.

The course of the route to Pfühlpark was finally determined on 5 July 2001 before the opening of the first section of track. Construction started on 9 September 2003, including the demolition of the bridge of the closed Bottwar Valley Railway (Bottwartalbahn) over Jägerhausstraße since it would have obstructed the line’s overhead wire. This section was opened on 25 November 2004.

The line was connected to the Crailsheim–Heilbronn railway on 10 December 2005 and since then line S4 has run to Öhringen. As part of the extension of the Stadtbahn line, Karlstor station, which was on the Hohenlohe Railway in the urban area, was closed.

=== Northern branch ===
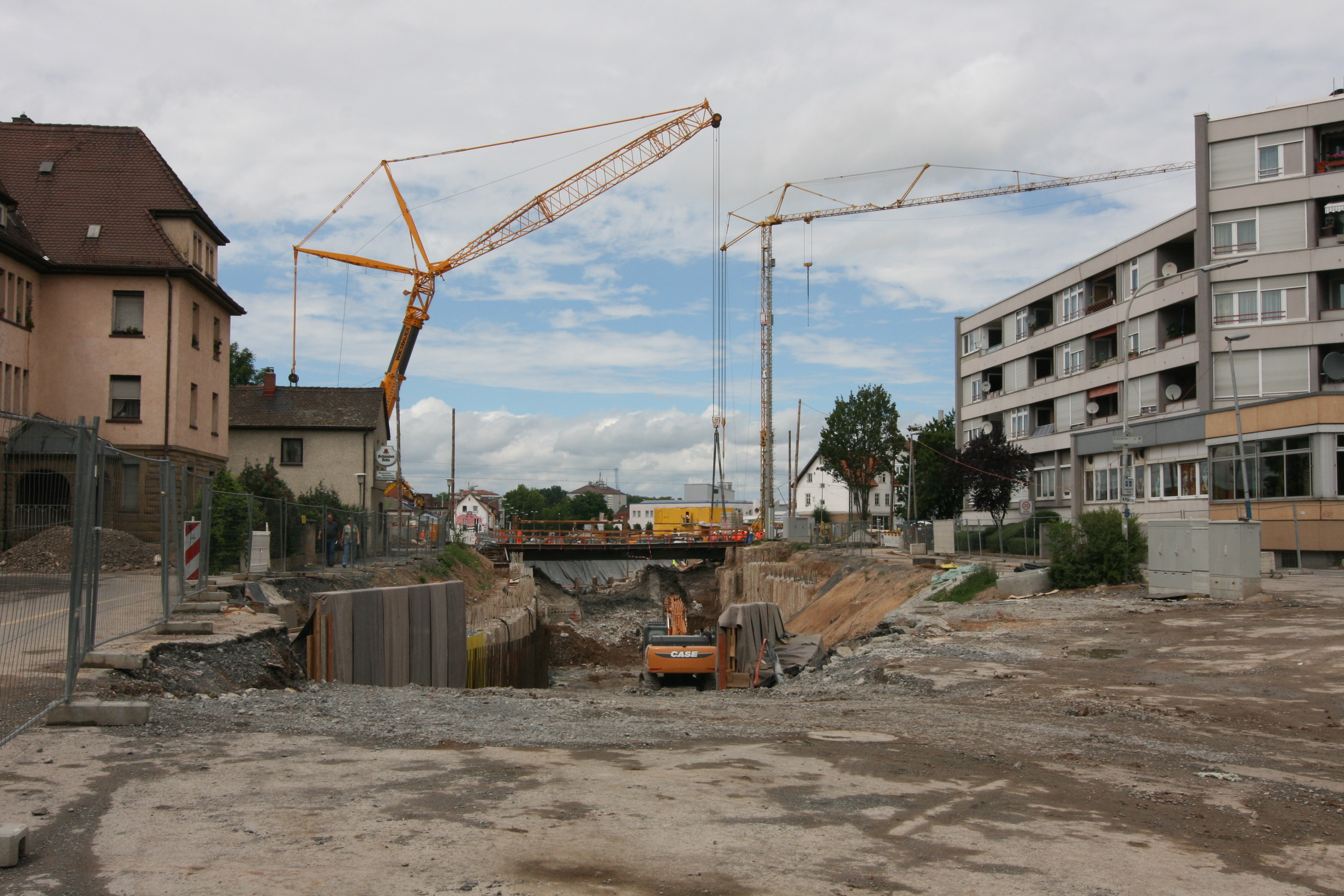
Installation of a temporary bridge at the site of the underpass for the railway tracks at Am Sülmertor (June 2012)

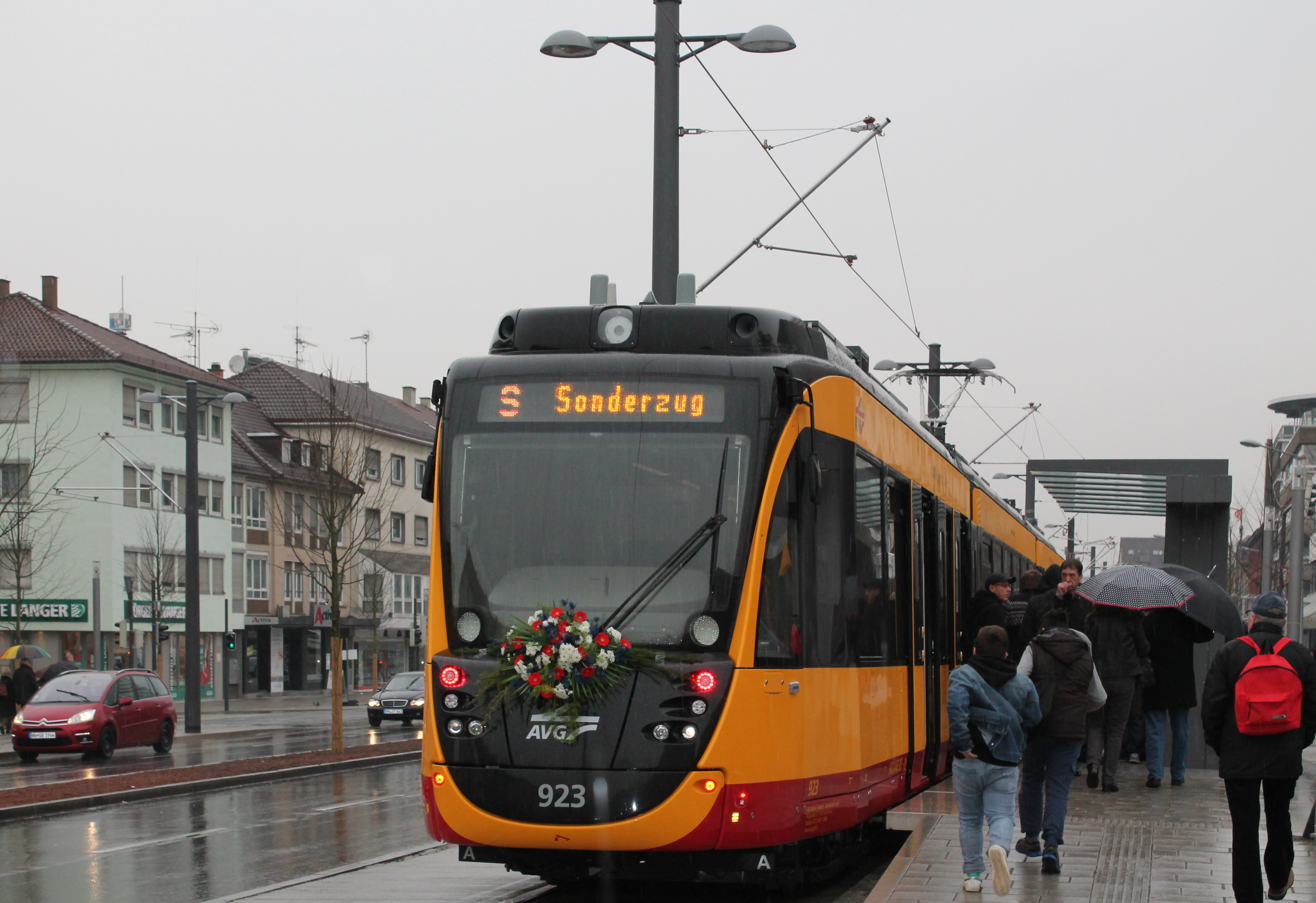
Special train for the opening of the northern branch on 14 December 2013

Stadtwerke Heilbronn GmbH were awarded a contract worth €1.2 million for the planning of the construction of the northern branch after a Europe-wide tender on 21 June 2007.

On 22 June 2007, the neighbouring municipalities, the district of Heilbronn and Deutsche Bahn AG signed a planning agreement covering the extension of the Heilbronn Stadtbahn to the north, which would cost about €77 million. Overall, the extension would cost around €136 million.

On 4 May 2005, the Heilbronn council considered work for a new line through the city to operate under BOStrab, which was expected to cost €59 million. On 20 December 2007, the route along the Allee was adopted.

The CDU, FDP, FWV, SPD and Left parties made a joint submission to the Heilbronn council in September 2010, proposing that the route run instead through the city on Mannheimer Straße, running to Europaplatz and Weipertstraße. After several special sessions of the local council, the parties dropped their request and approved the planned route via Paulinenstraße.

The Stuttgart Regional Council adopted the planning approval for the section through the centre of the city of Heilbronn on 13 January 2011. Preparatory work was carried out from April 2010, including the construction of supply lines. In the summer of 2011, work began on the rebuilding of the underpass under Am Sülmertor. The Heilbronn city administration expected the completion of the overall project at the end of 2014. The total cost of the northern branch of the Stadtbahn was expected to amount to €84.2 million.

Because of delayed approval for the use of EEO for the ET 2010 (part of the Bombardier Flexity Swift family) vehicles, the section between Kaufland and Neckarsulm was temporarily dedicated as a BOStrab line. On 4 November 2013 the first test run took place on this section. Until the reclassification of the northern section of the line as an EEO route and its connection to the DB network in December 2014, Stadtbahn services could only operate as far as Neckarsulm. The operation of trains through to Sinsheim was delayed until 1 May 2015 by the renovation of a bridge in Bad Wimpfen.

== Notes ==
=== Sources ===
- Die Stadtbahn Heilbronn. Schienenverkehr zwischen Eppingen und Öhringen (in German). Ubstadt-Weiher: verlag regionalkultur. 2005. ISBN 3-89735-416-0.
