= Heilbronner Hohenloher Haller Nahverkehr =

Heilbronner Hohenloher Haller Nahverkehr

The Heilbronner Hohenloher Haller Nahverkehr (HNV or H3NV) is a regional transport cooperative that coordinates tickets and fares among all transport operators in the metropolitan area of Heilbronn in Germany. Besides the city of Heilbronn, the H3NV area encompasses the districts of Heilbronn and Hohenlohe. There are also overlappings with the districts of Schwäbisch Hall, Main-Tauber, Rhein-Neckar and Neckar-Odenwald.
