= Öhringen Hauptbahnhof =

Railway station in Germany

Öhringen Hbf
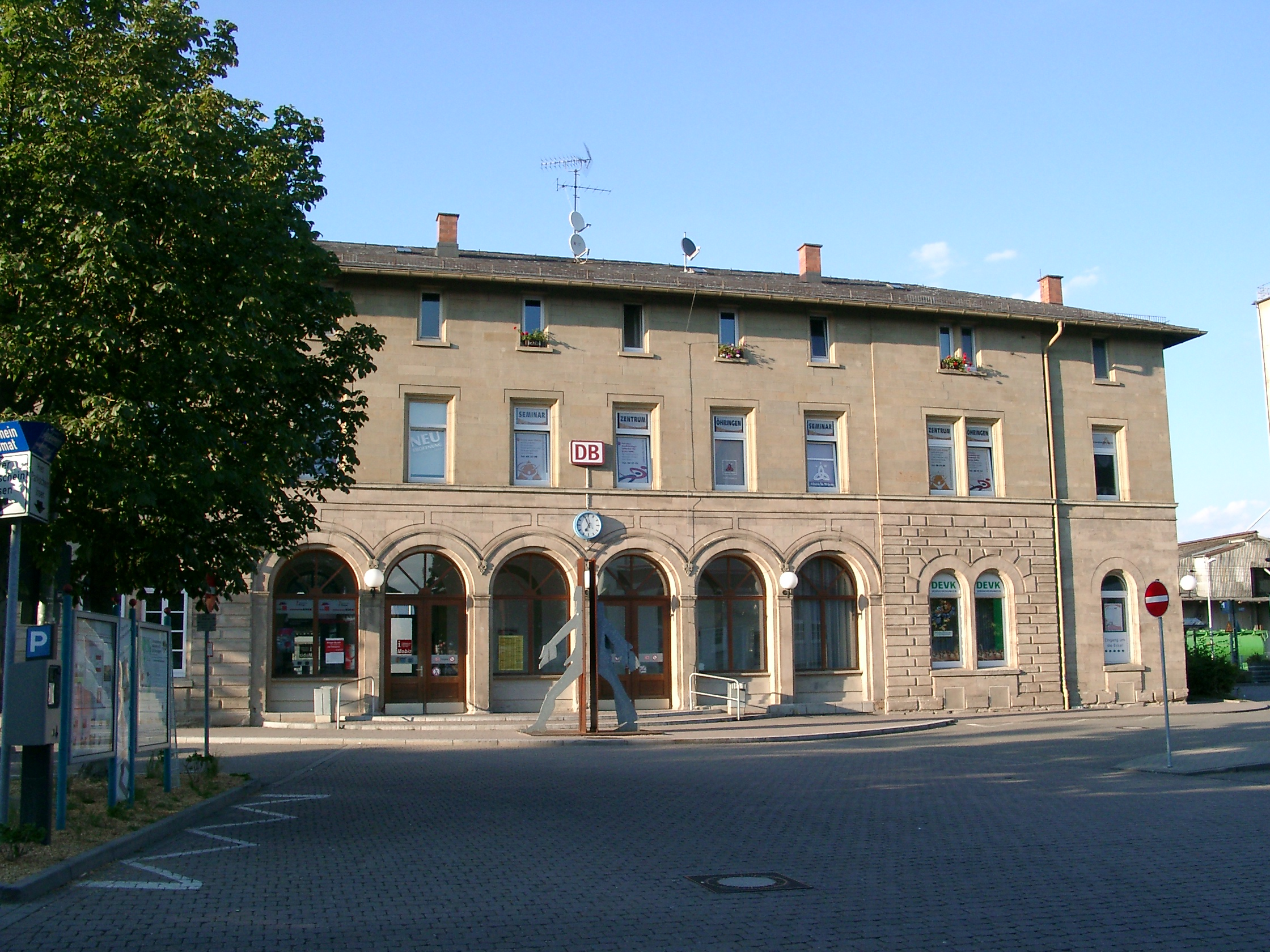
- Front of the station building

General information
- Location: Ebertstraße 1, Öhringen, Baden-Württemberg; Germany
- Coordinates: 49°12′11″N 9°30′10″E
- Line: Hohenlohe Railway
- Platforms: 3

Construction
- Accessible: Yes

Other information
- Station code: 4754
- DS100 code: TOE
- IBNR: 8004623
- Category: 5
- Fare zone: HNV: 831
- Website: www.bahnhof.de

History
- Opened: 1862

Services
Preceding station		Following station
Willsbach towards Heilbronn Hbf	RE 80	Neuenstein towards Crailsheim
Weinsberg towards Heilbronn Hbf	RB 83	Neuenstein towards Schwäbisch Hall-Hessental
Preceding station	Karlsruhe Stadtbahn	Following station
Öhringen West towards Karlsruhe Albtalbahnhof	S 4	Öhringen-Cappel Terminus
Location

Öhringen Hauptbahnhof is a station on the Hohenlohe Railway in Öhringen in the German state of Baden-Württemberg. The station is classified by Deutsche Bahn as a category 5 station. The station is part of the zone of the KreisVerkehr Schwäbisch Hall (transport district of Schwäbisch Hall) and is the largest and most important station of the Hohenlohe district.

== History ==
The station was opened in 1862 and was formerly called Öhringen station. At the timetable change in December 2008 it was renamed Öhringen Hauptbahnhof.

== Rolling stock ==
Regional-Express trains on the Heilbronn–Crailsheim route are mainly operated with diesel multiple units of classes 642 (Siemens Desiro) and 628. Once a day a Regional-Express service runs from Heilbronn to Öhringen, composed of double-deck coaches hauled by a class 146 (TRAXX) locomotive. As the Heilbronn–Öhringen-Cappel section of the Hohenlohe Railway is electrified, the operation of trains stopping at all stations trains is divided into two sections: the Heilbronn–Öhringen-Cappel section is operated with Karlsruhe Stadtbahn electric multiple units of class GT8-100D/2S-M. This line is operated by the Heilbronn Stadtbahn. On the Öhringen Hbf–Schwäbisch Hall-Hessental section diesel multiple units of classes 642 and 628 are used.

== Rail services ==
Services stopping at the station were as follows in 2025:

Line	Route	Frequency
RE 80	Heilbronn Hbf – Weinsberg – Öhringen Hbf – Waldenburg – Schwäbisch Hall – Schwäbisch Hall-Hessental – Crailsheim	120 min
RB 83	Öhringen Hbf – Waldenburg – Schwäbisch Hall – Schwäbisch Hall-Hessental	120 min
S 4	Karlsruhe Hbf – Karlsruhe-Durlach – Bretten – Eppingen – Schwaigern (Württ) – Heilbronn Hbf – Heilbronn Pfühlpark – Weinsberg – Öhringen Hbf – Öhringen-Cappel	10 or 30 min
