= Eckartshausen-Ilshofen station =

Railway station in Ilshofen, Germany

Eckartshausen-Ilshofen
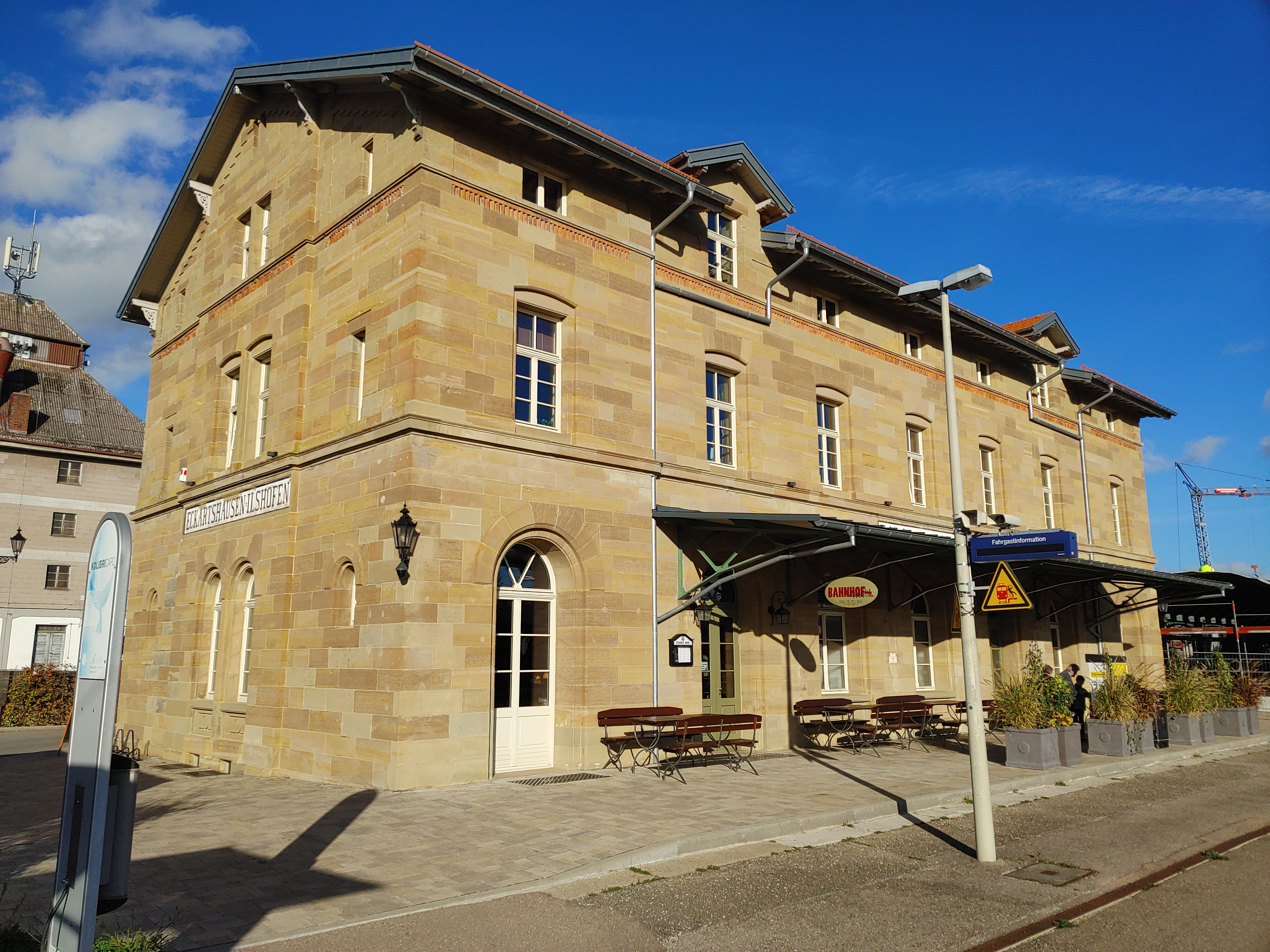

General information
- Location: Am Bahnhof 1; 74532 Ilshofen; Baden-Württemberg; Germany
- Coordinates: 49.1524°N 9.9367°E
- Elevation: 434 m (1,424 ft)
- System: Hp
- Owner: Deutsche Bahn
- Operator: DB Station&Service
- Lines: Crailsheim–Heilbronn railway (KBS 783/KBS 785)
- Platforms: 2 side platforms
- Tracks: 2
- Train operators: Go-Ahead Baden-Württemberg; Westfrankenbahn

Construction
- Parking: yes
- Cycle facilities: yes
- Accessible: yes

Other information
- Station code: 1456
- DS100 code: TEI
- IBNR: 8001651
- Category: 6
- Fare zone: KVSH: 12709
- Website: www.bahnhof.de

Services
Preceding station		Following station
Schwäbisch Hall-Hessental towards Stuttgart Hbf	RE 90	Crailsheim towards Nürnberg Hbf
Preceding station		Following station
Schwäbisch Hall-Hessental towards Heilbronn Hbf	RE 80	Crailsheim Terminus
Location
- Location within Baden-Württemberg Location within Germany Location within Europe

Eckartshausen-Ilshofen station is a railway station in the Eckartshausen district of the municipality of Ilshofen, located in the Schwäbisch Hall district in Baden-Württemberg, Germany.
