= Fichtenberg station =

Railway station in the municipality of Fichtenberg (Württemberg)

Fichtenberg

General information
- Location: Bahnhofstr. 33; 74427 Fichtenberg; Baden-Württemberg; Germany
- Coordinates: 48°59′15″N 9°42′08″E
- Elevation: 348 m (1,142 ft)
- System: Bf
- Owner: DB Netz
- Operator: DB Station&Service
- Lines: Murr Railway (KBS 785)
- Platforms: 2 side platforms
- Tracks: 2
- Train operators: DB Regio Baden-Württemberg; Go-Ahead Baden-Württemberg
- Connections: Bus interchange

Construction
- Parking: yes
- Cycle facilities: yes
- Accessible: yes

Other information
- Station code: 1788
- DS100 code: TFI
- IBNR: 8001982
- Category: 6
- Fare zone: KVSH: 12717
- Website: www.bahnhof.de

Services
Preceding station	DB Regio Baden-Württemberg	Following station
Fornsbach towards Stuttgart Hbf	MEX 19	Gaildorf West towards Schwäbisch Hall-Hessental or Crailsheim
Location
- Location within Baden-Württemberg Location within Germany Location within Europe

Fichtenberg station is a railway station in the municipality of Fichtenberg, located in the Schwäbisch Hall district in Baden-Württemberg, Germany. The station lies on the Murr Railway. The train services are operated by DB Regio Baden-Württemberg and partly Go-Ahead Baden-Württemberg.
