= Schwäbisch Hall station =

Railway station in Schwäbisch Hall, Germany

Schwäbisch Hall
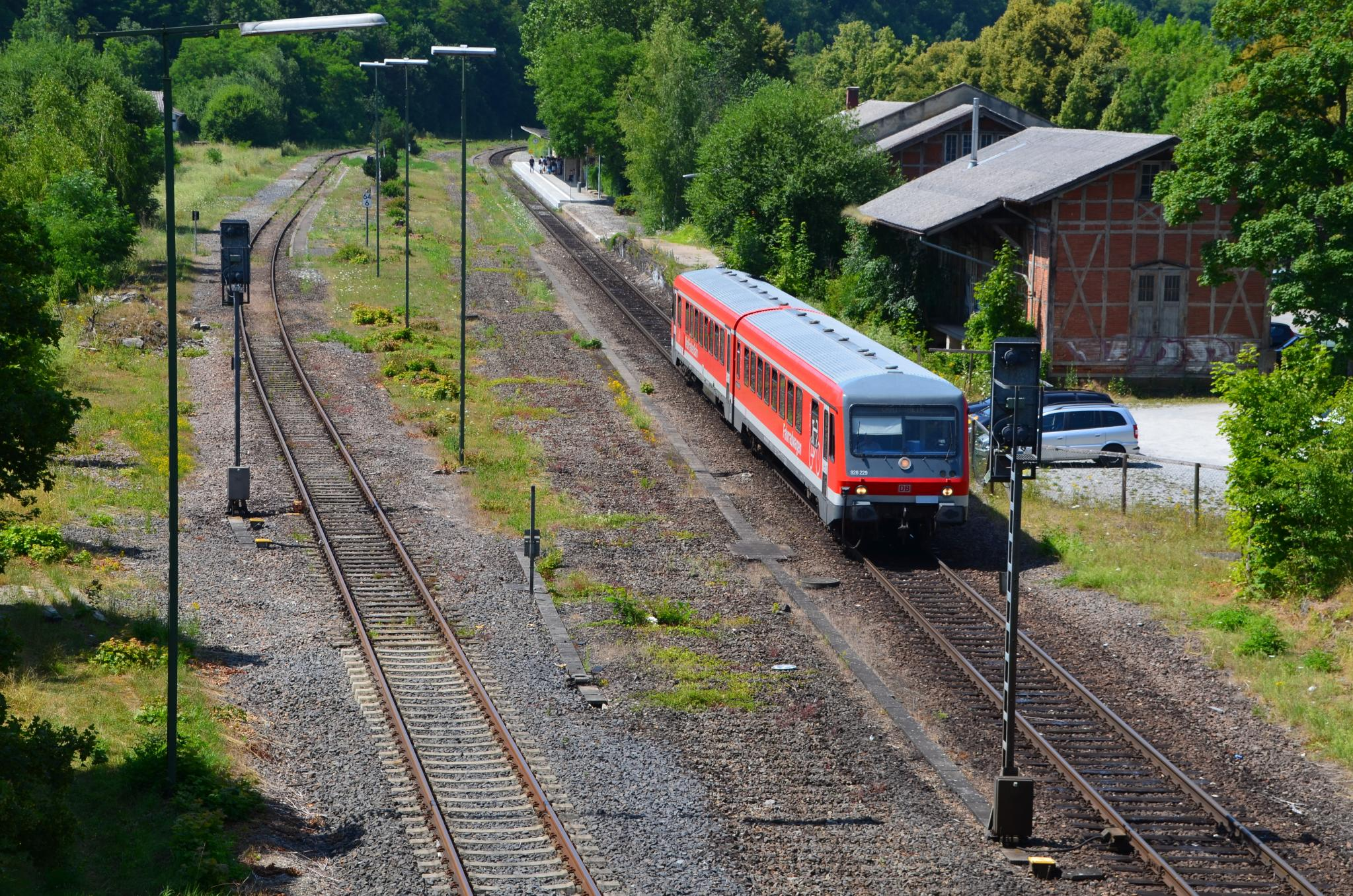
- Tracks and platforms

General information
- Location: Bahnhofstr. 1, Schwäbisch Hall, Baden-Württemberg; Germany
- Coordinates: 49°06′29″N 9°44′02″E
- Elevation: 305 m (1,001 ft)
- Owner: Deutsche Bahn
- Operator: DB Netz; DB Station&Service
- Line: Hohenlohe Railway (km 64.7)
- Platforms: 1
- Tracks: 1

Construction
- Accessible: Yes

Other information
- Station code: 5700
- DS100 code: TSHL
- IBNR: 8005449
- Category: 6
- Fare zone: KVSH: 12713; HNV: 510 (KVSH transitional zone)
- Website: www.bahnhof.de

History
- Opened: 1868

Services
Preceding station		Following station
Wackershofen towards Heilbronn Hbf	RE 80	Schwäbisch Hall-Hessental towards Crailsheim
Wackershofen towards Heilbronn Hbf	RB 83	Schwäbisch Hall-Hessental Terminus
Location

Schwäbisch Hall station is located in Schwäbisch Hall in the German state of Baden-Württemberg. It lies on the Crailsheim–Heilbronn railway (Hohenlohebahn) and is classified by Deutsche Bahn as a category 6 station.

== Location ==
Schwäbisch Hall Station is located just to the south-west of Hall's old town at the top of the drop from an old southwestern meander of the Kocher river (Bahnhofsbucht, meaning "station bay") to the lower slope of the modern river and is about 30 metres above the river level. The terrain was partly filled to a quite high level for the construction of railway facilities. The station stands on a terrace with steep slope to Steinbacher Straße, which runs parallel with it.

== History ==
Schwäbisch Hall station is located on the Crailsheim–Heilbronn railway, originally called the Kocherbahn ("Kocher Railway", referring to the Kocher river). The line was built at the request of the population and followed its approval by the Württemberg Chamber of Deputies in 1860. The Heilbronn–Schwäbisch Hall section was opened in 1862 and extended to Crailsheim in December 1867. The station originally had three platforms, which were connected by crossings over the tracks, a freight yard, a signal box, which was demolished in 1968, and several sidings.

=== Loss of significance with the opening of the Murr Railway ===
About 10 years after the construction of Schwäbisch Hall station, the building of the Waiblingen–Schwäbisch Hall railway (Murr Valley Railway) connected Stuttgart with Crailsheim and provided a shorter route to Nuremberg than the line through Aalen. The Murr Valley Railway ended at a junction with the Crailsheim–Heilbronn railway on a ridge on the eastern side of the Kocher valley gorge in Hessental, which at that time had not yet been incorporated in Hall; this route avoided Schwäbisch Hall station, which is on the valley slopes. This meant that the town station, despite its more central location, became less significant than the Hessental station.

=== Damage in World War II and the postwar period ===
A Second World War air raid on 23 February 1945 destroyed the three-storey station building, killing eight people. After the Second World War, it was initially rebuilt in a temporary form. The new station building was opened in 1955. Queen Elizabeth II visited on a special train on 24 May 1965.

Today the station has only one platform as the siding had been removed by 1988. The platform was modernised in 2013. The station building is no longer in regular use and is closed to the public. It is occasionally opened for temporary art exhibitions. In 2019, Deutsche Bahn applied to the Federal Railway Authority for approval to construct a pedestrian underpass at the station and relocate a platform track. The railway-law approval procedure was completed in August 2022. The project was originally scheduled for completion in 2026. In 2025, it was announced that the project could not be implemented as planned and that completion was now scheduled for 2028.
