= Satteldorf station =

Railway station in the municipality of Satteldorf

Satteldorf
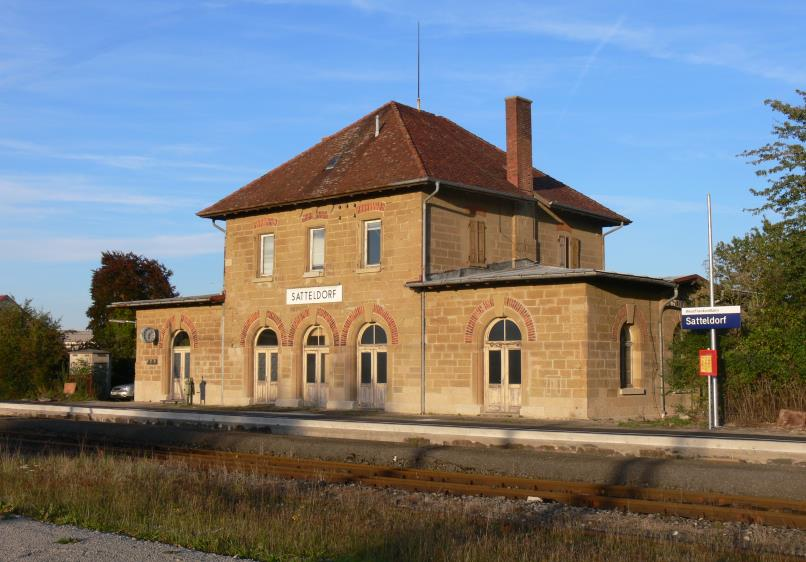

General information
- Location: Am bhf 5; 74589 Satteldorf; Baden-Württemberg; Germany
- Coordinates: 49°10′42″N 10°4′41″E
- Elevation: 421 m (1,381 ft)
- System: Bf
- Owner: DB RegioNetz
- Operator: DB Station&Service
- Lines: Tauber Valley Railway (KBS 782)
- Platforms: 1 side platform
- Tracks: 2
- Train operators: Westfrankenbahn
- Connections: Bus interchange

Construction
- Parking: yes
- Accessible: yes

Other information
- Station code: n/a
- DS100 code: TSAT
- IBNR: 8005297
- Fare zone: KVSH: 12711; VGN: 1771 (KVSH transitional zone)

Services
Preceding station		Following station
Wallhausen (Württ) towards Aschaffenburg Hbf	RE 87	Crailsheim Terminus
Wallhausen (Württ) towards Wertheim	RB 88	Crailsheim Terminus
Location
- Location within Baden-Württemberg Location within Germany Location within Europe

Satteldorf station is a railway station in the municipality of Satteldorf, located in the Schwäbisch Hall district in Baden-Württemberg, Germany. The station lies on the Tauber Valley Railway and is owned by DB RegioNetz. The train services are operated by Westfrankenbahn.

== History ==
On 23 October 1869 the Royal Württemberg State Railways put the station into operation with the Crailsheim–Mergentheim line.

The station building is now privately owned. The building houses a mechanical signal box with lever frames, from which the station's switches and semaphore signals are set via double-wire lines. Satteldorf station has been back in passenger service since 10 September 2007, after no passenger trains had stopped there for 22 years.

At the station, the depot of the construction company Leonhard Weiss has a siding.

== Cultural heritage ==
The former reception building is a listed building and is part of the Bad Mergentheim-Crailsheim railway line: Württembergische Tauber Valley Railway with stations, outbuildings, bridges, tracks and all stationary and movable equipment.
