= Gaildorf West station =

Railway station in Gaildorf, Germany

Gaildorf West
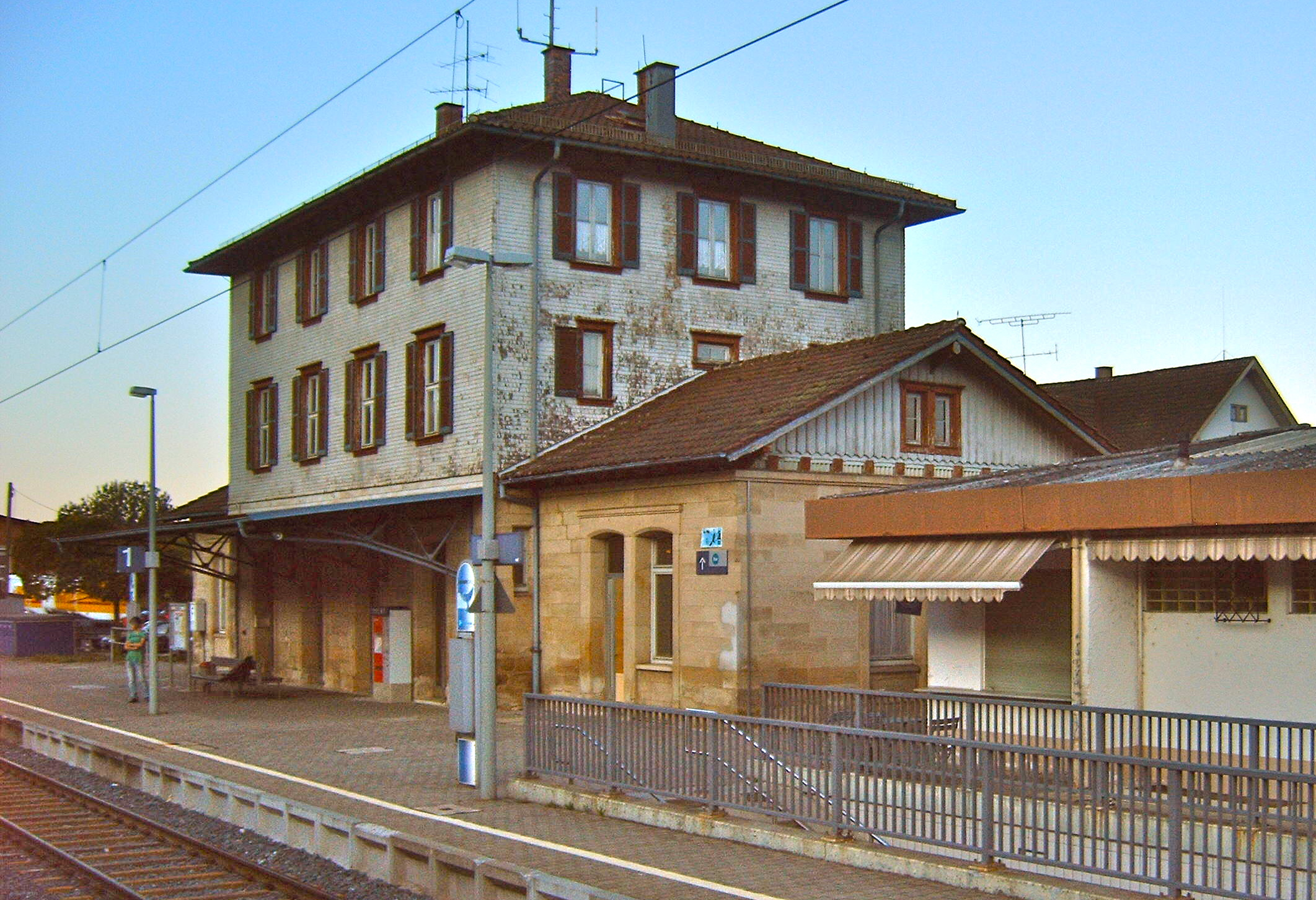
- 2010

General information
- Location: Bahnhofstraße 123; 74405 Gaildorf; Baden-Württemberg; Germany
- Coordinates: 49.0036°N 9.7542°E
- Elevation: 348 m (1,142 ft)
- Owner: Deutsche Bahn
- Operator: DB InfraGO
- Lines: Murrbahn (KBS 785); Upper Kocher Valley Railway
- Platforms: 1 island platform 1 side platform
- Tracks: 3
- Train operators: DB Regio Baden-Württemberg; Arverio Baden-Württemberg
- Connections: RE 19RE 90; RB 19

Construction
- Parking: yes
- Cycle facilities: yes
- Accessible: partly

Other information
- Station code: 1998
- DS100 code: TGAW
- IBNR: 8002168
- Category: 6
- Fare zone: KVSH: 12715
- Website: www.bahnhof.de

History
- Opened: 1 December 1879; 146 years ago

Services
Preceding station	DB Regio Baden-Württemberg	Following station
Fichtenberg towards Stuttgart Hbf	MEX 19	Terminus
Murrhardt towards Stuttgart Hbf	MEX 90	Schwäbisch Hall-Hessental Terminus
Preceding station		Following station
Murrhardt towards Stuttgart Hbf	RE 90	Schwäbisch Hall-Hessental towards Nürnberg Hbf
Location

Gaildorf West station is a railway station in the municipality of Gaildorf, located in the Schwäbisch Hall district in Baden-Württemberg, Germany.
