= Crailsheim station =

Railway station in Crailsheim, Germany

Crailsheim
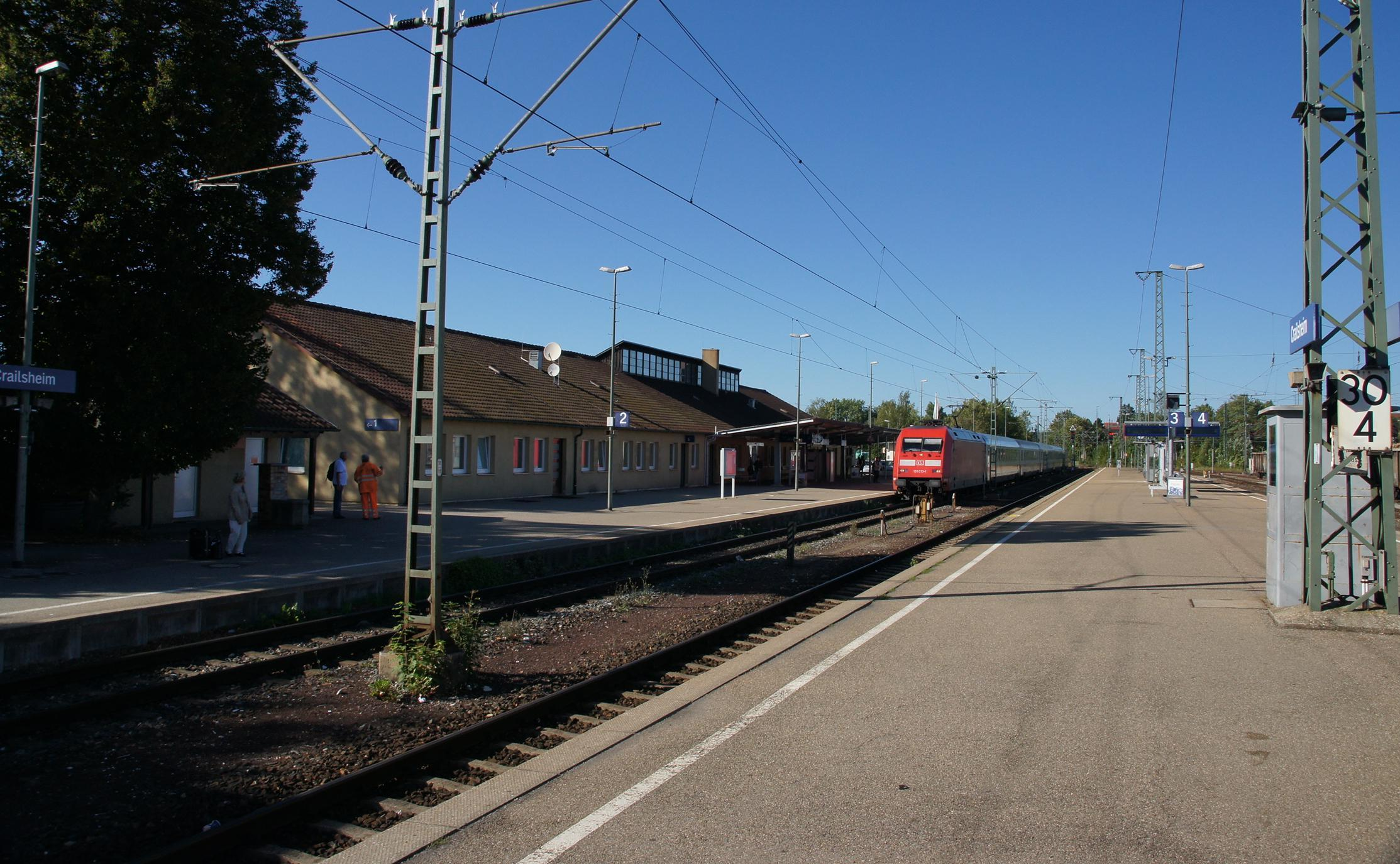
- 2011

General information
- Location: Am Bahnhof 1, Crailsheim, Baden-Württemberg; Germany
- Coordinates: 49°8′16″N 10°3′52″E
- Owner: Deutsche Bahn
- Operator: DB Station&Service
- Lines: Tauber Valley Railway (KBS 782); Hohenlohe Railway (KBS 783) (KBS 785); Upper Jagst Railway (KBS 786); Nuremberg–Crailsheim railway (KBS 786)
- Platforms: 4

Construction
- Accessible: Yes

Other information
- Station code: 1079
- DS100 code: TC
- IBNR: 8000067
- Category: 3
- Fare zone: KVSH: 12711; VGN: 1771 (KVSH transitional zone)
- Website: www.bahnhof.de

History
- Opened: 15 November 1866; 159 years ago
Services
Preceding station	DB Fernverkehr	Following station
Ellwangen towards Karlsruhe Hbf	IC 61	Ansbach towards Nürnberg Hbf or Leipzig Hbf
Preceding station		Following station
Eckartshausen-Ilshofen towards Heilbronn Hbf	RE 80	Terminus
Satteldorf towards Aschaffenburg Hbf	RE 87	Terminus
Satteldorf towards Wertheim	RB 88	Terminus
Preceding station		Following station
Eckartshausen-Ilshofen towards Stuttgart Hbf	RE 90	Schnelldorf towards Nürnberg Hbf
Jagstzell towards Stuttgart Hbf	MEX 13	Terminus
Preceding station	Nuremberg S-Bahn	Following station
Terminus	S4	Schnelldorf towards Nürnberg Hbf
Location

Crailsheim station is a junction station in the German state of Baden-Württemberg where four railway lines converge. It lies at the 30.4 km point (from Goldshöfe) on the Upper Jagst Railway, with the chainage continuing on the Hohenlohe Railway. The chainage on the Tauber Valley Railway and the line to Nuremberg starts at the station. With its four platform tracks and numerous passing tracks and sidings, it is the largest station in the district of Schwäbisch Hall. It is by served by Intercity and regional trains, and is the western terminus of line S4 of the Nuremberg S-Bahn.

== History ==
The construction of a railway line from Heilbronn via Schwäbisch Hall to Wasseralfingen (near Aalen) was authorised in a resolution of the parliament of the Kingdom of Württemberg on 17 November 1858. The proponents planned a route along the Jagst to connect the cities of Crailsheim and Ellwangen. The route was in competition with a proposed line from Gaildorf and the upper Kocher valley, which was a much shorter route.

Crailsheim mayor Nagel and the administrator of the Ellwangen district (Oberamt Ellwangen), Karl Weinheimer, founded a railway committee with other citizens, which successfully represented the interests of the leading officials of Crailsheim and Ellwangen. The committee proposed Crailsheim as a possible new hub for lines to Würzburg and Nuremberg, convincing the parliament of its merits. The reason advanced was the higher number of inhabitants of the cities Ellwangen and Crailsheim, compared to Gaildorf, as well as the greater volume of trade.

The Hohenlohe Railway (then called the Kocherbahn, Kocher Railway) reached Schwäbisch Hall on 4 August 1862. Parliament approved the rapid extension of the line to Crailsheim on 13 April 1865. The government of Bavaria also expressed satisfaction with this route.

The Crailsheim council and a citizens' committee now discussed the location of the station. They foresaw the establishment of the station in the Ansbacher district (on the road to Ansbach), between the Wilder-Mann-Keller hotel and the Wasserstall area (now in the area around Gebiet Albert-Schweitzer-Gymnasium, Volksfestplatz and Beuerlbacher Straße, northeast of the centre of the town). However, this was not possible for topographical reasons and the authorities had to choose a site to the west of the town. Initially, a site in the Haller district (on the road to Schwäbisch Hall) was considered but eventually it was decided to build the station directly to the west of central Crailsheim in the Siechenäcker area.

As is still clearly visible, the station has an exact north–south orientation. Worthingtonstraße (formerly Kronprinzstraße), the Alte Postweg, and some other streets were rerouted. Underpasses were built for the roads to Roßfeld and to Altenmünster.

The Royal Württemberg State Railways (Königlich Württembergischen Staats-Eisenbahnen, KWSt.E.) built a monumental entrance building in Crailsheim, as it was the seat of the district (oberamt) with nearly 3,000 inhabitants. The construction work continued from February to November 1866.

The station was formally opened with the commissioning of the Upper Jagst Railway on 15 November 1866. On 10 December 1867, the State Railway completed the Hall–Crailsheim section of the Kocher Railway.

=== Crailsheim as a border station ===
On 12 December 1868, the Bavarian-Württemberg treaty was signed, which provided for the construction of the Nuremberg–Crailsheim railway. The line was completed on 15 June 1876 with the completion of the Dombühl–border–Crailsheim section. As a result, Crailsheim station won addition importance as a border station.

The station building received a three-story extension in 1874–1875 for the accommodation of the Bavarian staff. In addition, the Royal Bavarian State Railways (Königlich Bayerische Staats-Eisenbahnen) built a roundhouse and a freight shed. This was the beginning of the Crailsheim depot.

Since the KWSt.E. operated on Stuttgart local time and the Bavarian State Railways operated on Munich time, this meant that operations towards Bavaria, had to operate by a tower clock at the northern end of the station which was nine and a half minutes ahead of Stuttgart time. New houses were built near the station for the Bavarian railway workers.

From 1887 to 1890, the KWSt.E. duplicated the line from Heilbronn to the border of Bavaria and Württemberg at Ellrichshausen. This was intended to improve east–west connections between Franconia and the French border for military reasons.

On 1 January 1890, the KWSt.E. took over the operations of the Bavarian State Railways and replaced the Bavarian staff. Only the northern station clock marked the function of the station as a border station, until it along with the other clocks was changed to Central European Time on 1 June 1891.

=== Deutsche Reichsbahn period ===
On 1 1920 April the Württemberg State Railways was absorbed by Deutsche Reichsbahn. Under the Reichsbahn, Crailsheim station was one of the main stations in Württemberg. Express trains on the Berlin–Stuttgart, Prague–Stuttgart and Frankfurt–Friedrichshafen routes stopped here.

The Crailsheim railway junction and depot had a military role during the Second World War. It is likely, according to the then stationmaster, that more than one million soldiers passed through the station in the six years of the war. On 23 February 1945, Allied bombers attacked Crailsheim in two waves. They destroyed or damaged all the buildings in the station area. Overall, on that day 61 people died in the city and 100 suffered injuries. More air strikes were made on the railways on 1 and 4 April 1945 and rail traffic towards Nuremberg and Lauda was interrupted completely.

=== Post-war period ===
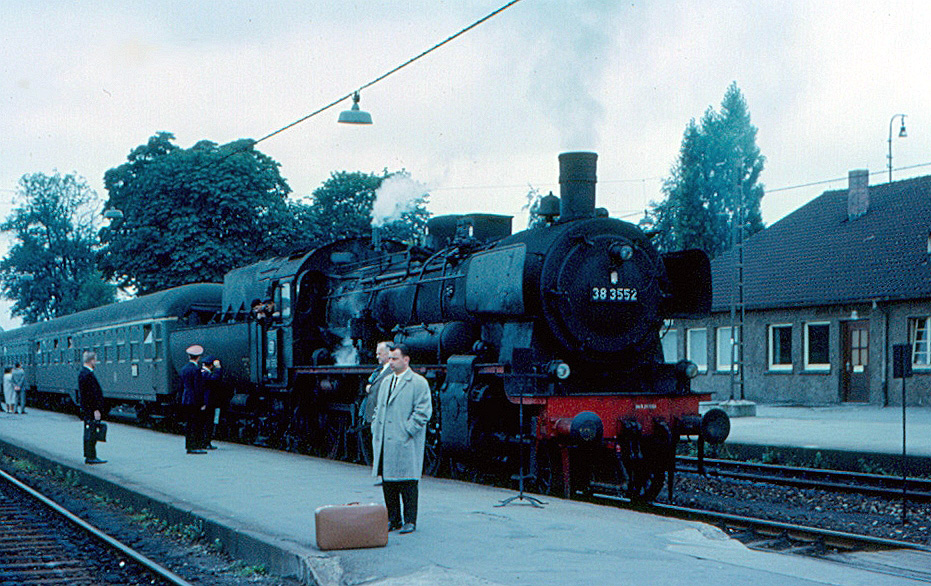
Station's platform in 1965

After the Second World War, many experts were involved in the construction of the city which had suffered from air raids and destructive shelling. Also the city council called for a transformation of the station. A new entrance building would not be rebuilt on an island between the tracks, which was perceived as unfavourable, but at Kronprinzstraße (Worthingtonstraße since 1948).

The railway division (Eisenbahndirektionen) in Stuttgart, agreed with this proposal. In the meantime in 1948 and 1949, it built a one-story facility at the old location that went into service on 24 December 1949. Elaborate plans were made in the 1970s for a new station building and related facilities but Deutsche Bundesbahn finally rejected them in 1981 as unaffordable and the temporary station of 1949 continues to this day.

=== Modernisation ===
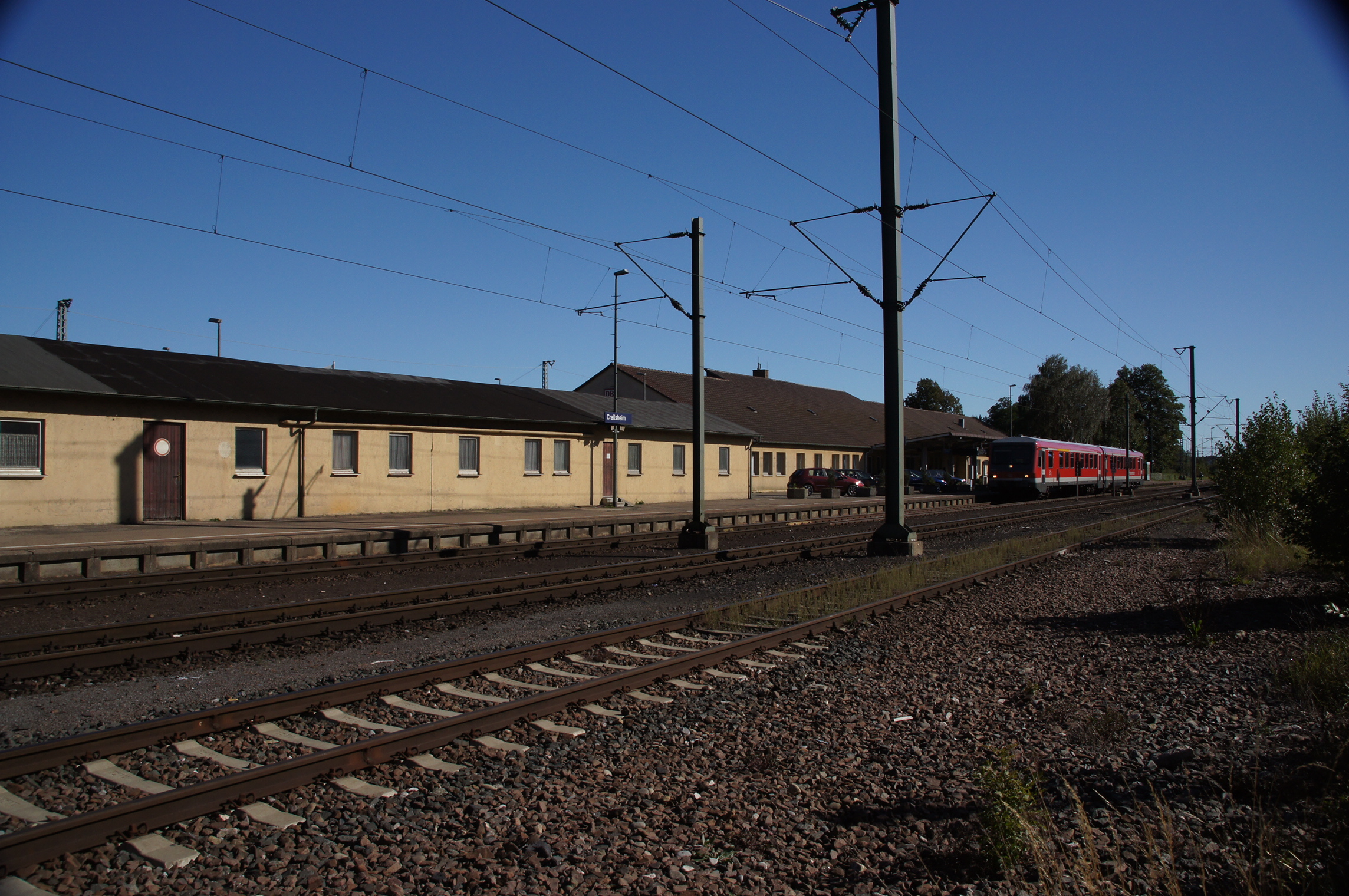
Track 1 with Regionalbahn to Aschaffenburg Hbf

The city has lowered Worthingtonstraße and built a bus station and new parking lots. On 2 June 1985, Deutsche Bundesbahn commenced regular electric operations between Ansbach and Goldshöfe. On 31 May 1996, electrification was completed of the Marbach (Neckar)–Crailsheim section.

== Entrance building (1866-1945) ==
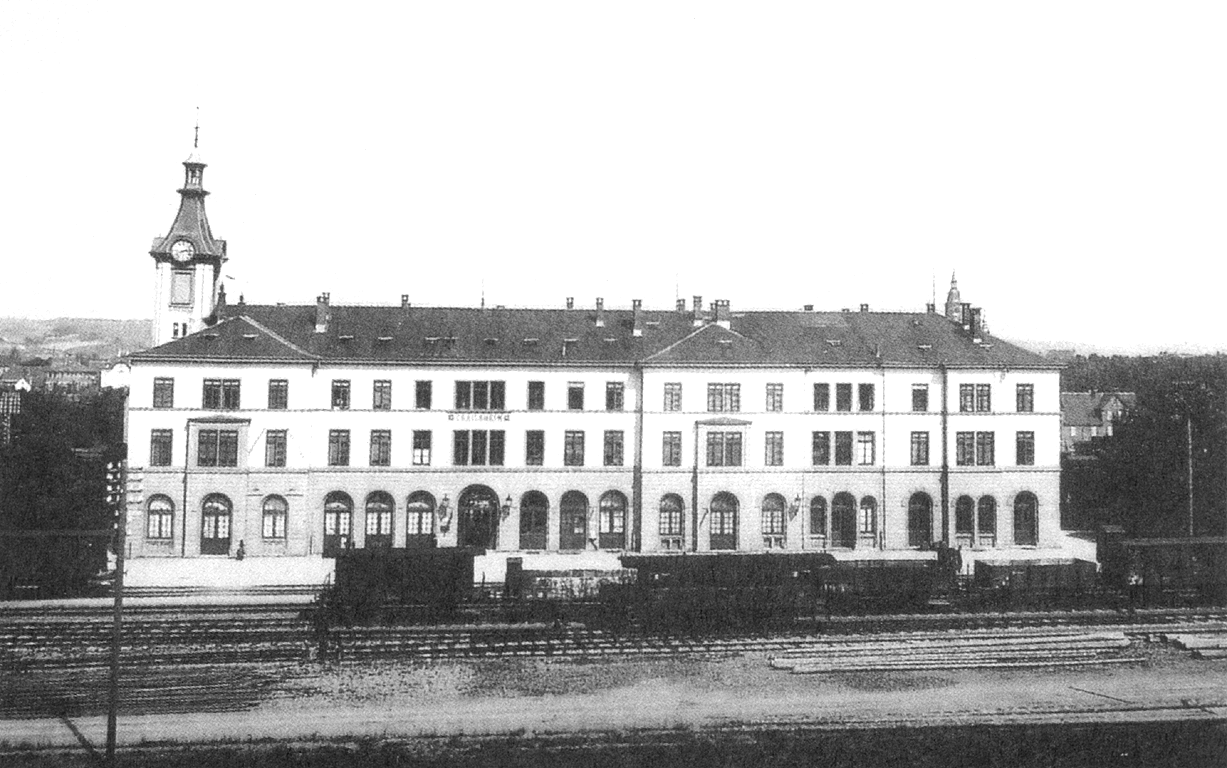
Crailsheim station in 1905

Crailsheim station was designed by building inspector (Bauinspektor) Baumann as a three-story building, which was almost 46 metres long and 17 metres wide. It consisted of two wings and a central structure. The windows and doors on the ground floor were fitted with arches in the Rundbogenstil (round arch style). The facade was made of gray sandstone. The upper floors had a shiny finish. The roof was slate-covered.

A special feature of this building was the northern clock tower, with a height of 28.7 metres. It emphasised the importance of the station as a border station and was adapted also to the silhouette of the city, with the Stadtturm (town tower) and the towers of the churches of Liebfrauenkapelle and Johanneskirche.

The station building was located in an island between the tracks. The access road led—as it still does—from Bahnhofstraße/Haller Straße to the station. It was lined with elms from the beginning. The main entrance was on the north side of the building below the tower. Behind it was a lobby, which was 5.35 metres to 5.16 meters tall and surrounded by the ticket office and baggage counter. Passengers passed through a 45 metre long and 3.16 metre wide corridor to the waiting room, which was still divided into classes.

On 12 December 1868, the KWSt.E. agreed to expand the station to handle border operations and to allow the Royal Bavarian State Railways to operate the Nuremberg–Crailsheim line. The Bavarian building was built to the south and it also had a three-story annex. It was identical to the original building and had a length of 19 metres. Its width was the same.

On 23 February 1945, there was a heavy air raid on Crailsheim, which also targeted the railway junction. The entrance building was burned out and collapsed. Its reconstruction after World War II was considered out of the question, because the city council already wanted to get rid of the island building. Since 1949, a temporary station has stood in its place.

== Depot ==
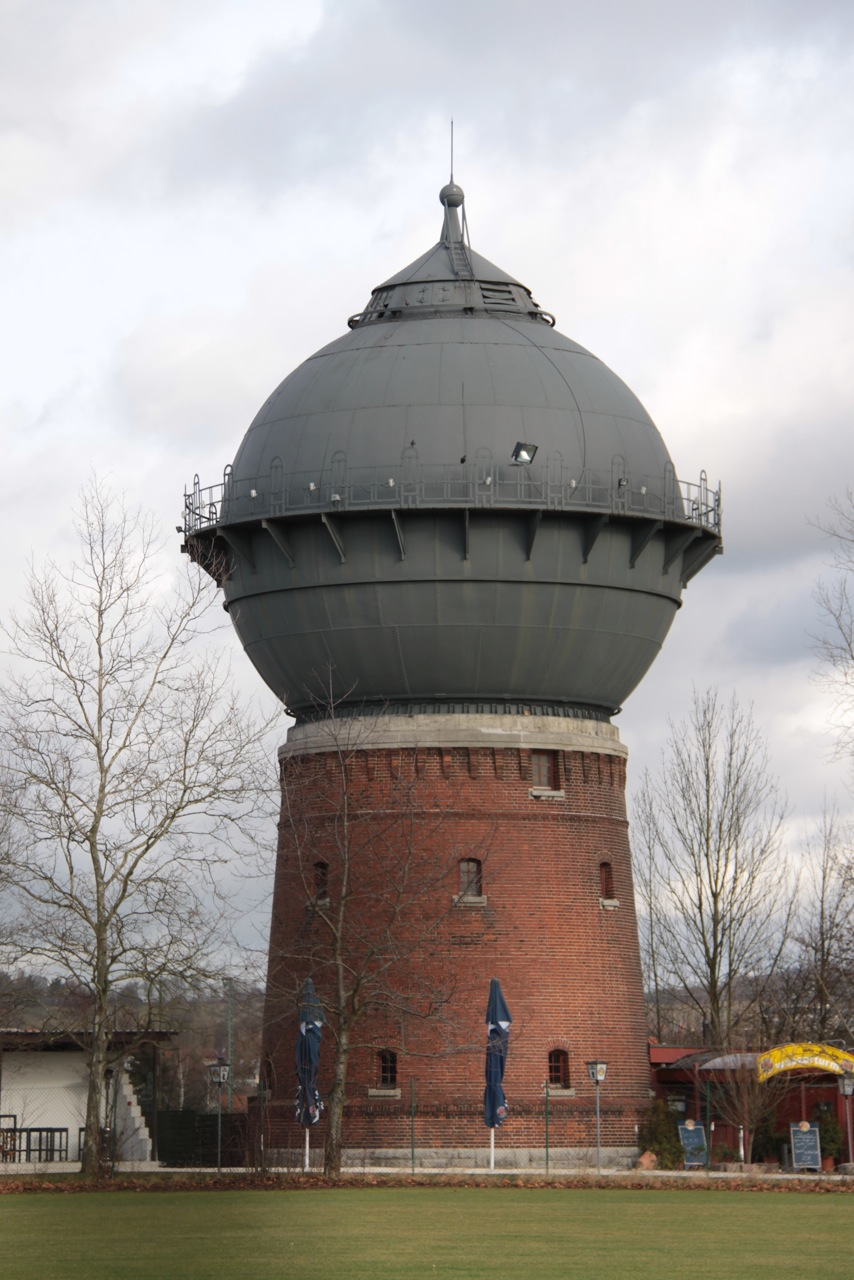
Water tower at Crailsheim depot

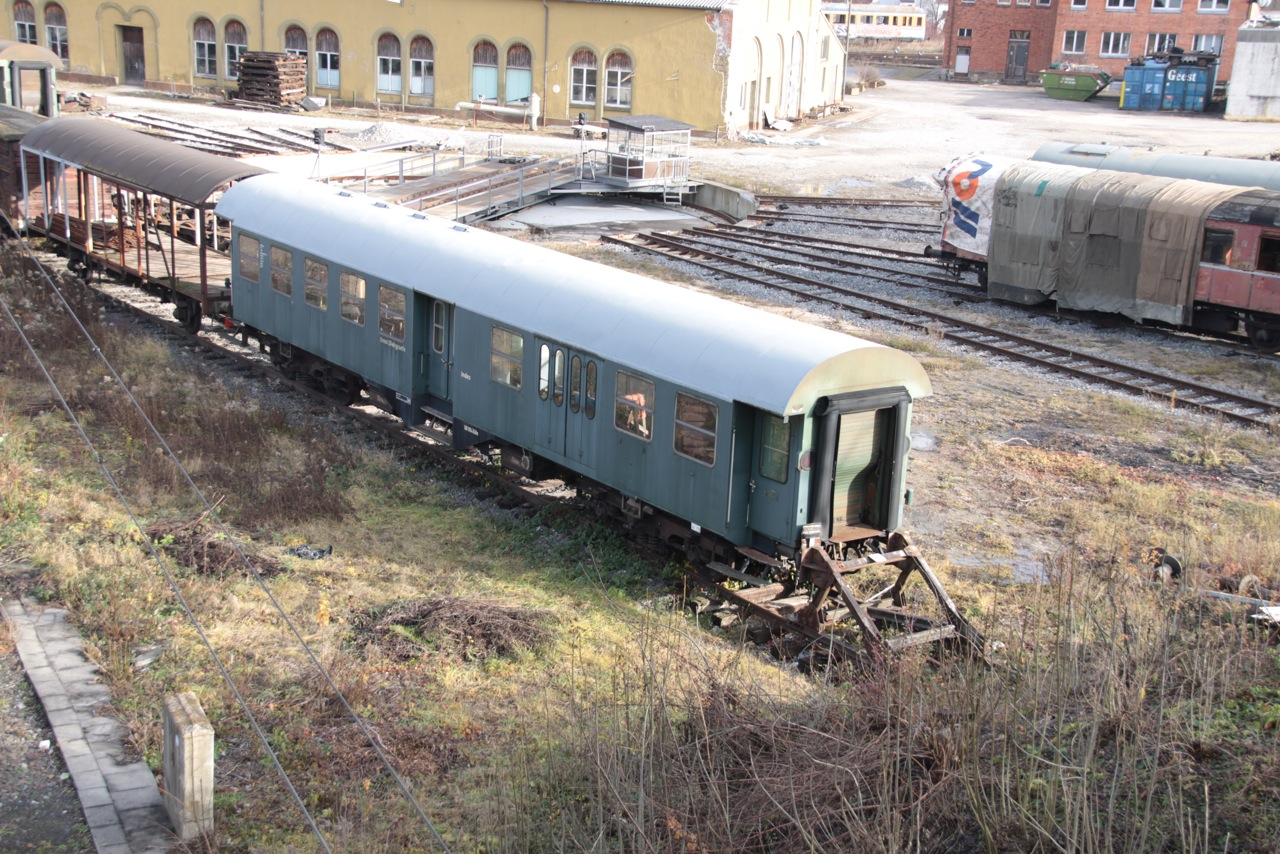
New turntable in Crailsheim depot with museum carriages

Due to the importance of traffic at the station, it was soon necessary to station locomotives there. A locomotive depot was established in 1870 at the southern end of the station between the lines to Hessental and Aalen. A second turntable was established in 1926.

With the opening of the line from Nuremberg, the Bavarian State Railways also needed its own depots, these were built in the eastern part of the station (on the Bavarian side). These depots were not abandoned until 1930, although operations had been handed over to the Württemberg State Railways in 1890.

After the destruction of the Second World War, the depot flourished during the steam era, with up to 70 locomotives stationed there. But with the decline of steam operations, the depot became insignificant. On 30 May 1976, at the end of the winter timetable, the last steam locomotive used the Crailsheim depot. A week later, two class 44 locomotives left Crailsheim depot, making it steam-free, so that there were now only diesel operations. The turntables were dismantled in 1985 with the introduction of electrical operations.

Today not much is left the former locomotive depot and the distinctive water tower now serves as a bar. A portion of the site is used by the DBK Historic Railway association, which has managed to build a new turntable with the assistance of grants.

== Rail operations ==
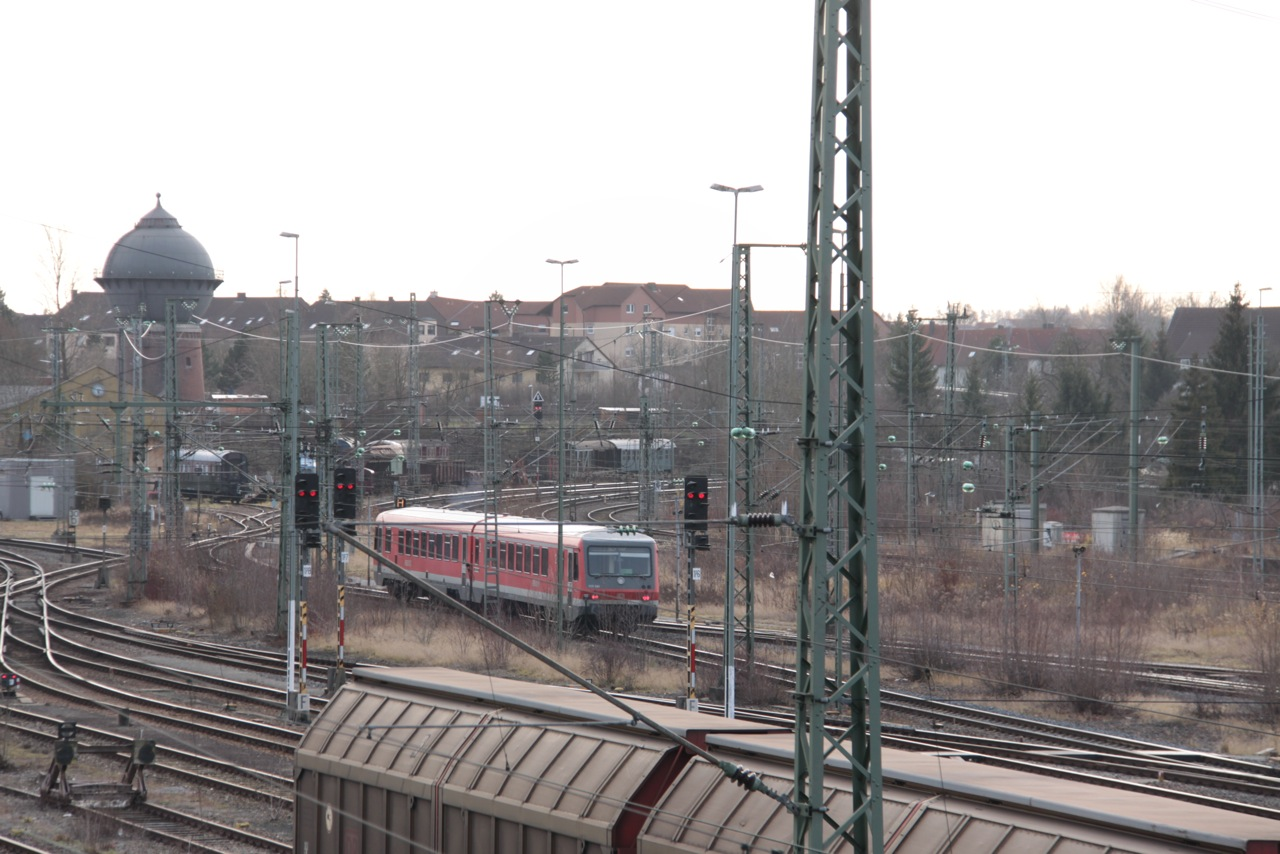
Crailsheim station looking west

Crailsheim station is a railway junction at the intersection of the Upper Jagst Railway, the Nuremberg–Crailsheim railway, the Hohenlohe Railway and the Tauber Valley Railway. Track 1, the western “home” platform (next to the station building) is mostly used for train services to Schwäbisch Hall-Hessental and Lauda. Some trains also run towards Ansbach. Track 2, the eastern “home” platform is served by intercity trains to Aalen and some trains in all directions. Track 3 is served by trains to Schwäbisch Hall-Hessental, Ansbach and Lauda. Inter-city trains running to Ansbach and Aalen stop on track 4.

The station is classified by Deutsche Bahn as a category 3 station.

=== Long-distance ===
Route		Frequency
IC 61	Karlsruhe – Pforzheim – Stuttgart – Aalen – Crailsheim – Nuremberg – Bamberg – Saalfeld – Jena Paradies – Leipzig	Every 2 hours

=== Regional services ===
Regional services as of 2023:

Route		Frequency
RE 80	Heilbronn – Öhringen – Schwäbisch Hall – Schwäbisch Hall-Hessental – Crailsheim	Every 2 hours
RE 87	Aschaffenburg – Miltenberg – Wertheim – Tauberbischofsheim – Lauda – Bad Mergentheim – Crailsheim	Every 2 hours
RE 90	Stuttgart – Bad Cannstatt – Waiblingen – Backnang – Schwäbisch Hall-Hessental – Crailsheim (– Ansbach – Nuremberg)	Every 2 hours
MEX 13	Stuttgart – Aalen – Ellwangen – Crailsheim	Every 2 hours
MEX 90	Stuttgart – Backnang – Gaildorf West – Schwäbisch Hall-Hessental (– Crailsheim)	Individual services
RB 88	Aschaffenburg – Miltenberg – Wertheim – Lauda – Bad Mergentheim – Crailsheim	Every 2 hours, Mon–Fri

=== S-Bahn services ===
From 15 December 2024 the station is served by Nuremberg S-Bahn line S4 every two hours:

Route		Frequency
S4	Nürnberg Hbf – Ansbach – Crailsheim	Every 2 hours

== Literature ==
- Willi Glasbrenner (1994). Die Eisenbahn in Crailsheim (in German). Freiburg (Breisgau): EK-Verlag. ISBN 978-3-88255-718-3.
- Roland Feitenhansl (2003). Der Bahnhof Heilbronn – seine Empfangsgebäude von 1848, 1874 und 1958 (in German). Hövelhof: DGEG Medien. ISBN 978-3-937189-01-7.
- Martin Baier (2007). Crailsheimer Chronik 1945–1955. Die Nachkriegs- und Wiederaufbaujahre (in German). Crailsheim: Baier Verlag. ISBN 978-3-929233-71-1.
- Jürgen Gaßebner, Claus-Jürgen Jacobson (1999). Bahnanlagen aus der Luft (in German). Transpress-Verlag. ISBN 978-3-613-71098-6.
