= Schwäbisch Hall-Hessental station =

Railway station in Germany

Schwäbisch Hall Hessental
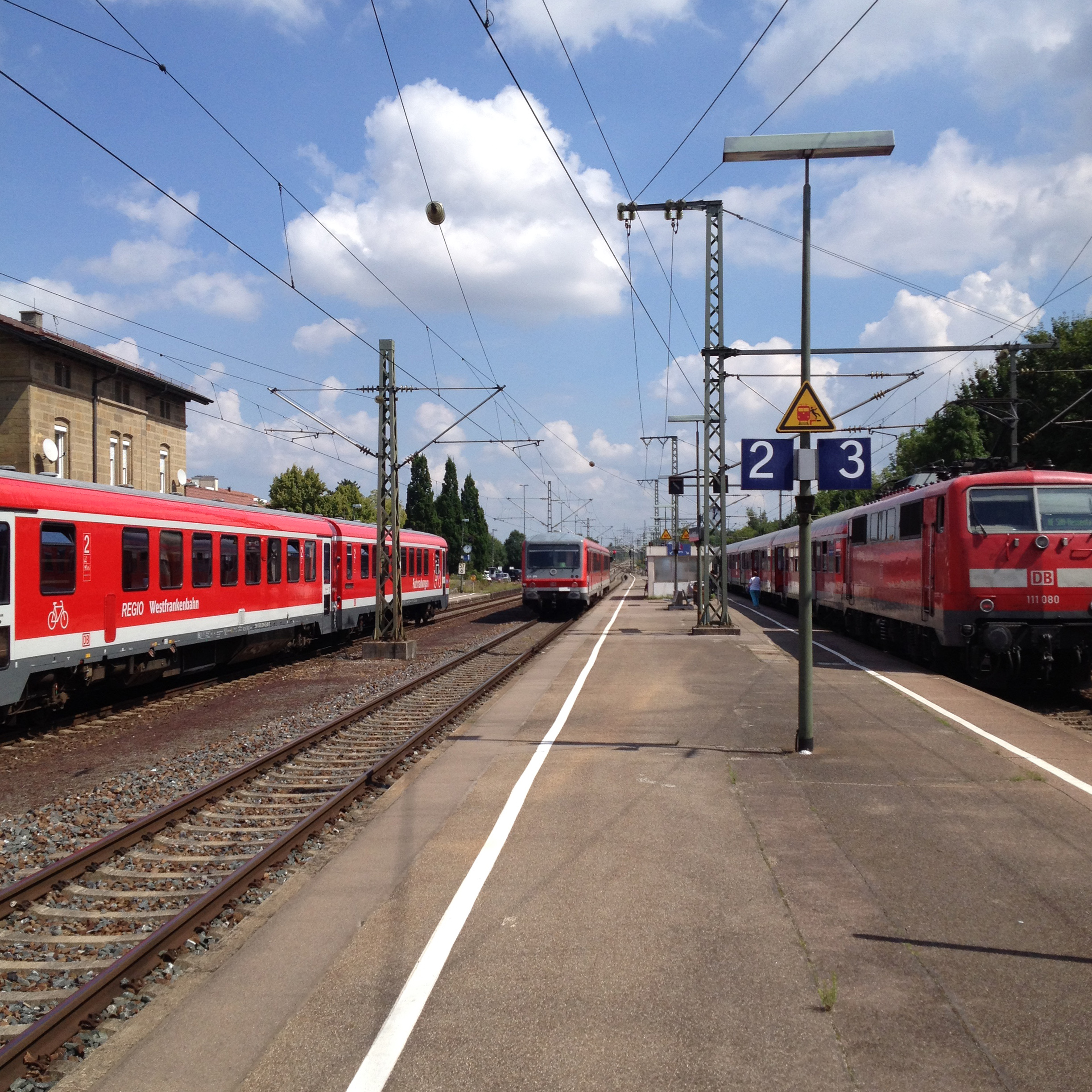
- Station tracks in 1989

General information
- Location: Karl-Kurz-Str.3, Hessental, Schwäbisch Hall, Baden-Württemberg; Germany
- Coordinates: 49°05′49″N 9°46′01″E
- Owner: Deutsche Bahn
- Operator: DB Netz; DB Station&Service
- Lines: Murr Railway (km 57.67); Hohenlohe Railway (km 60.73)
- Platforms: 3

Construction
- Accessible: No

Other information
- Station code: 5701
- DS100 code: TSHT
- IBNR: 8000330
- Category: 4
- Fare zone: KVSH: 12713; HNV: 510 (KVSH transitional zone)
- Website: www.bahnhof.de

History
- Opened: 1868
- Former names: Hessental

Services
Preceding station		Following station
Gaildorf West towards Stuttgart Hbf	RE 90	Eckartshausen-Ilshofen towards Nürnberg Hbf
Preceding station	DB Regio Baden-Württemberg	Following station
Gaildorf West towards Stuttgart Hbf	MEX 90	Terminus
Preceding station		Following station
Schwäbisch Hall towards Heilbronn Hbf	RE 80	Eckartshausen-Ilshofen towards Crailsheim
Schwäbisch Hall towards Heilbronn Hbf	RB 83	Terminus
Location

Schwäbisch Hall-Hessental station (called Hessental until 1933) is the more important of the two stations of the major district town of Schwäbisch Hall in the German state of Baden-Württemberg. It is a junction station (classified by Deutsche Bahn as a category 4 station) where the Waiblingen–Schwäbisch Hall railway (Murrbahn) branches off the Crailsheim–Heilbronn railway (Hohenlohebahn).

== Location ==
Schwäbisch Hall-Hessental station is four kilometres from Schwäbisch Hall, located in the district of Hessental. In the immediate vicinity of the station are the Breitloh/Karl-Kurz-Areal industrial area on the site of the former Kurz barrel factory, which was one of the largest companies in the city of Schwäbisch Hall until its bankruptcy in 1998.

== History ==
The station precinct emerged in December 1867 with the opening of the Crailsheim–Heilbronn railway, then called the Kocherbahn ("Kocher Railway", referring to the Kocher river). The line was built at the request of the population and followed its approval by the Württemberg Chamber of Deputies in 1860. The entrance building was not built until twelve years later, when the line was completed from Waiblingen to Hessental via Backnang and Gaildorf. As a result of the new connection, Schwäbisch Hall-Hessental station became operationally more significant that Schwäbisch Hall station, which was more centrally located in the town.

The Hessental concentration camp, which still existed in April 1945, was established in Alsace in a former barracks of the Reich Labour Service at Hessental station in the summer of 1944 as a sub-camp of the Natzweiler-Struthof camp. The first assignment of 600 prisoners arrived on 14 October 1944.

On 1 December 1988, a relay interlocking of the SpDr L 60 class was taken into operation, it gradually took remote control of signalling at the surrounding stations: Sulzdorf and Gaildorf West in March 1989 and Schwäbisch Hall on 1 January 1990.

In 1996, the line from Backnang via Hessental to Crailsheim, including the tracks through the station, were electrified. The line towards Heilbronn via Schwäbisch Hall station is still not electrified.

== Operations ==
Long-distance trains on the Stuttgart-Nuremberg route only stop here if they are not running on their regular route via Aalen, but are diverted via Backnang and Hessental, for example due to construction work. The station building, typical of East Württemberg, is still staffed.

Today (2023), the RE and RB trains (RE 80 and RB 83), which run every two hours, stop in Schwäbisch Hall-Hessental on the Heilbronn–Crailsheim (RE 80) or Heilbronn–Schwäbisch Hall-Hessental (RB 83) routes, as well as on the Stuttgart–Nuremberg (RE 90) and Stuttgart–Schwäbisch Hall-Hessental (MEX 90) routes.

The trains to and from Backnang either travel on the passing track or on the main track of that line.

== Platforms ==
Schwäbisch Hall Hessental station has three platform tracks, platform 1, which is next to the station building, and an island platform with two tracks. Platform 1 and platform 2 are used for main line services running through on the Crailsheim–Heilbronn railway. Platform 1 is used for trains running to and from Öhringen and continuing to Heilbronn, tracks 2 and 3 on the island platform are used for services on the line between Stuttgart and Crailsheim. Next to track 3 is track 4, which is a passing loop without a platforms.

West of the station, there was a 1.5 kilometre-long rail siding to the former Schwäbisch Hall Hessental airbase. Some sidings are still connected to the west of the station.
