= Heilbronn Hauptbahnhof =

Railway station in Germany

Heilbronn Hbf
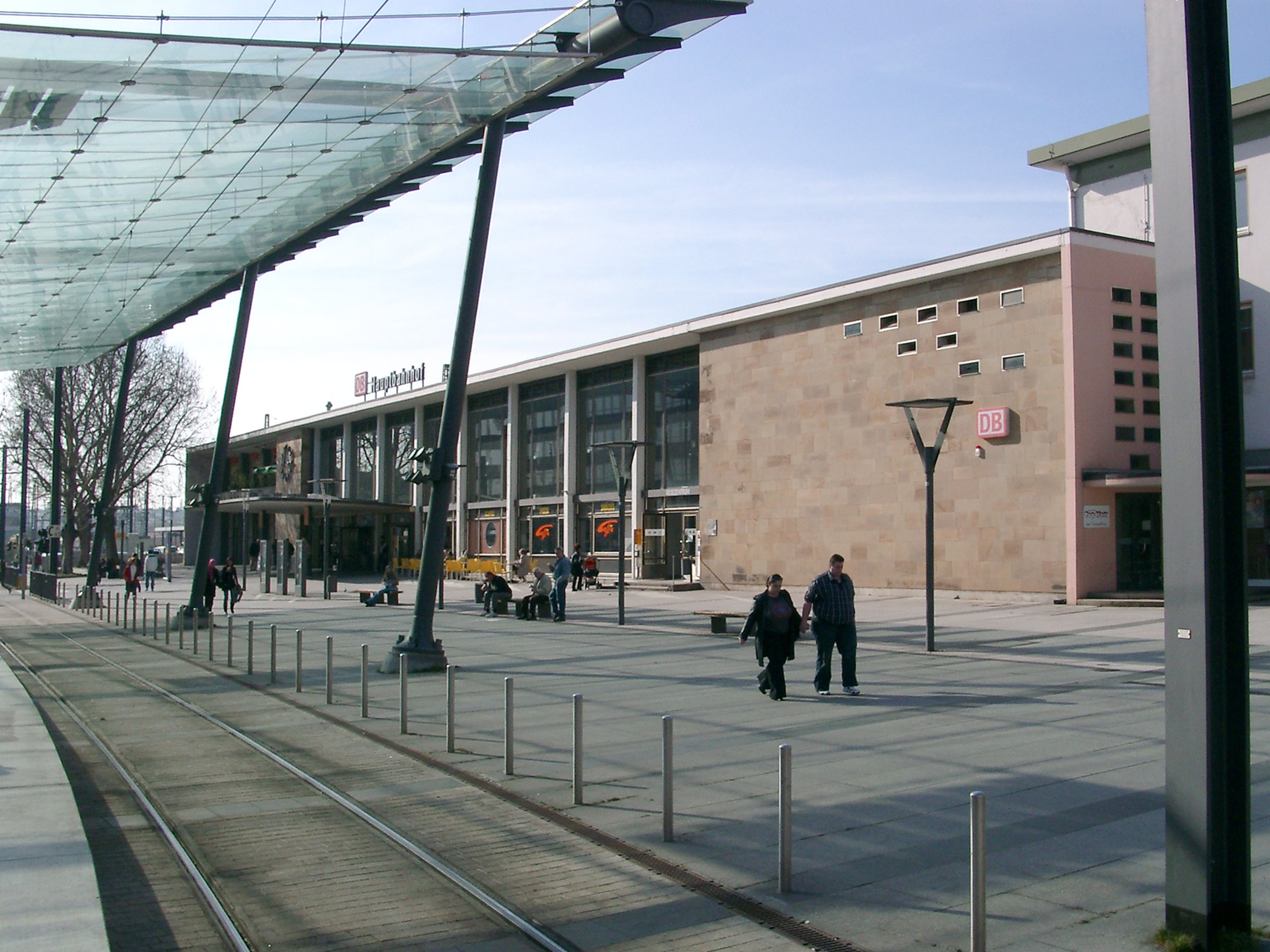
- Reception building, town side

General information
- Location: Bahnhofstr. 30, Heilbronn, Baden-Württemberg; Germany
- Coordinates: 49°08′34″N 9°12′29″E
- Lines: Stuttgart–Würzburg; Crailsheim–Heilbronn; Grötzingen–Heilbronn; Industrial and Port Railway
- Platforms: 7

Construction
- Accessible: Yes

Other information
- Station code: 2648
- DS100 code: TH
- IBNR: 8000157
- Category: 2
- Fare zone: HNV: A/10
- Website: www.bahnhof.de

History
- Opened: 6 March 1874

Services
Preceding station		Following station
Bietigheim-Bissingen towards Stuttgart Hbf	RE 8	Neckarsulm towards Würzburg Hbf
Preceding station	(Stuttgart)	Following station
Heilbronn Sülmertor towards Mannheim Hbf	RE 10a	Terminus
Heilbronn Sülmertor towards Mannheim Hbf	RE 10b	Terminus
Heilbronn Sülmertor towards Tübingen Hbf	MEX 12	Terminus
Heilbronn Sülmertor towards Tübingen Hbf	MEX 18	Terminus
Preceding station	DB Regio Mitte	Following station
Schwaigern (Württ) towards Karlsruhe Hbf	RE 45	Terminus
Preceding station		Following station
Terminus	RE 80	Weinsberg towards Crailsheim
Terminus	RB 83	Weinsberg towards Schwäbisch Hall-Hessental
Preceding station	Karlsruhe Stadtbahn	Following station
Böckingen Sonnenbrunnen towards Karlsruhe Albtalbahnhof	S 4	Heilbronn Trappensee towards Öhringen-Cappel
Preceding station	Heilbronn Stadtbahn	Following station
Neckarsulm Süd towards Mosbach (Baden)	S 41	Terminus
Neckarsulm Süd towards Sinsheim (Elsenz) Hbf	S 42	Terminus
Location

Heilbronn Hauptbahnhof (German: [haɪlˈbʁɔn ˈhaʊptbaːnˌhoːf]) is the main passenger railway station in Heilbronn in the German state of Baden-Württemberg.

== Description ==
Heilbronn Hauptbahnhof is located about 1 km west of the inner city of Heilbronn and the Old Neckar on a 1 km wide island between the old Neckar and the modern canalised Neckar. Southwest of the modern Neckar is the Heilbronn goods yard. At the western end of the station is the beginning of Bahnhofstraße (station street), which runs over the Friedrich Ebert Bridge and is a direct extension of Kaiserstraße running to Marktplatz (market square), the historic centre of Heilbronn.

=== Lobby ===
The main building was completed in 1958 to a design by Hellmut Kasel, based on a preliminary draft by Emil Schuh. The station's front has the canopy roof architecture of the time. The station building has a width of 120 m and is built out of concrete and glass, with a copper-covered roof. The central part of the building is a long hall with a glass front, 40 m long, 11.5 m wide and 7.5 m high. The floor of the lobby is made of Jurassic limestone tiles, and the walls are covered with Jurassic and Travertine panels. The ceiling includes a Rabitzkonstruktion (an installation of wire-reinforced plaster, invented by Carl Rabitz), consisting of panels that are sprayed with blue plaster.

The entire lobby is divided by vertical and horizontal lines. The southeast side of the hall consists almost entirely of glass.

To the west of the lobby there was formerly a restaurant, where there is still a stained glass window by Friedrich Knoedler. The west wing has a large open terrace on the ground floor and the former restaurant upstairs. The walls of the restaurant upstairs are covered with elm and maple. There is also a wall mosaic by Friedrich Knoedler. On the staircase there is also a statue of a girl with a fish by Hermann Koziol.

At the eastern end of the station there is a three-storey office building. On the eastern wall of the reception building is a colourful metal relief in silicate paint and wrought iron made in 1958 by Peter Jakob Schober, called "Travel by train—Heilbronn and the world" (Reisen mit der Bahn—Heilbronn und die Welt), which includes symbols of Heilbronn and the world.

The stained glass windows of the subway were created by Valentin Saile.

=== Forecourt ===
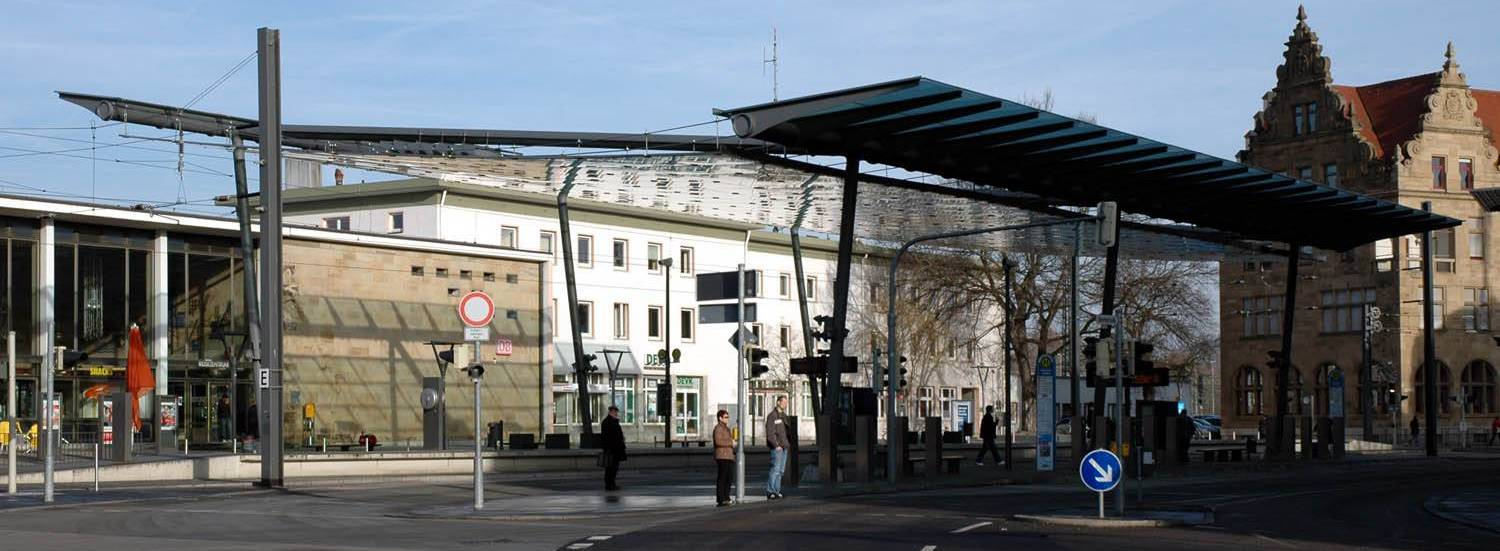
Roof over the Stadtbahn station on the esplanade

In the autumn of 1958, a new roof was built above the bus station in front of the station, which was designed by Heinrich Röhm. It was 20 m long and 3.40 m wide and has been described as a "sleek airplane-like structure". It rested on five pillars. The roof was replaced by a suspended honeycomb structure in 1980.

In 2001, a new canopy was built to connect the station with the Heilbronn Stadtbahn stop and the bus station. This was designed by Fritz Auer, Carlo Weber and Götz Guggenberger.

In November 2013, it was decided to name the station forecourt as Willy-Brandt-Platz. It was officially named on 18 December 2013 on the occasion of the 100th birthday of Willy Brandt. The stops for buses and the Stadtbahn outside the station was renamed at the 2013/2014 timetable change in December 2013. It is now officially called Heilbronn Hauptbahnhof/Willy-Brandt-Platz.

== Previous station ==
The original Heilbronn station of 1848 was built a little further east on the Neckar River near the harbour. The tracks to this station ran further south along the modern Bahnhofstraße.

The re-routing of the line and the increase in traffic meant that a new station was built at the current location in 1873. The station building of 1873 was destroyed in an air raid on Heilbronn on 4 December 1944. Today's station was built on its foundations.

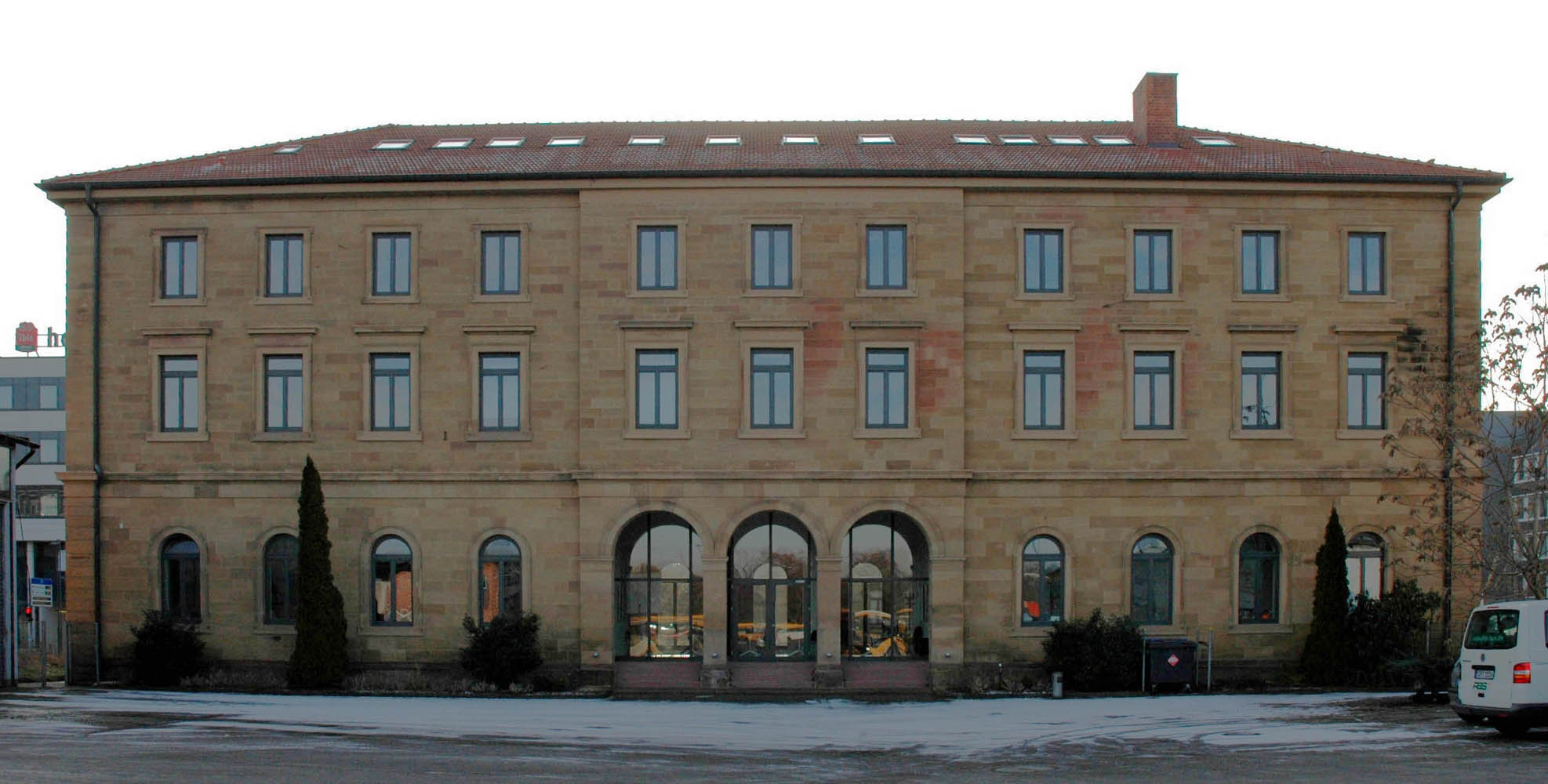
Old station of 1848

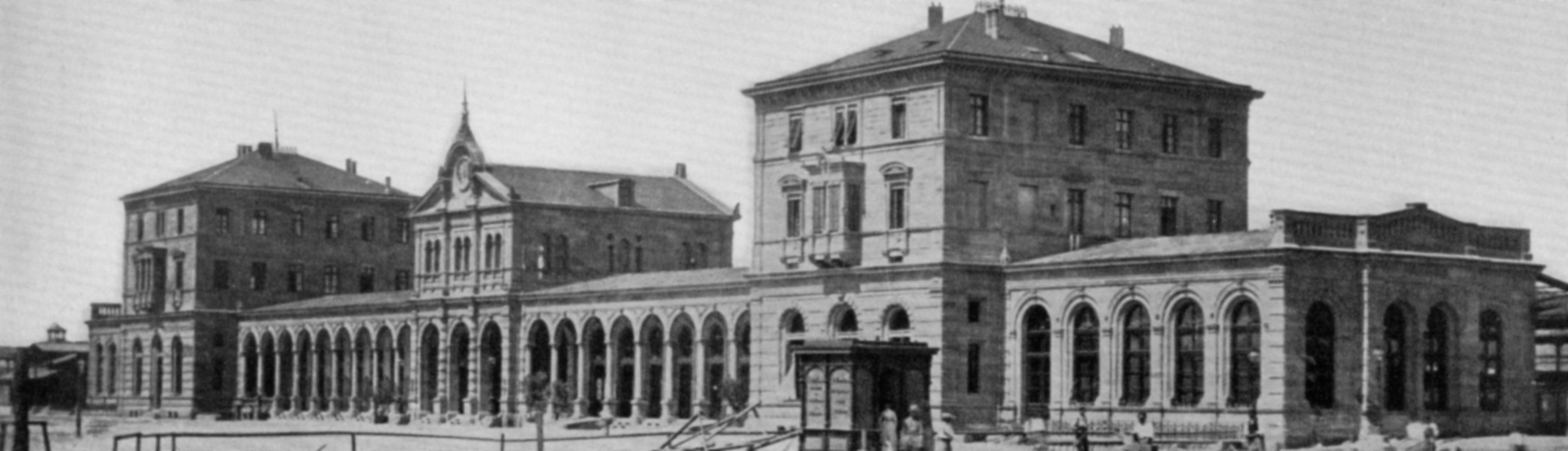
1873 station

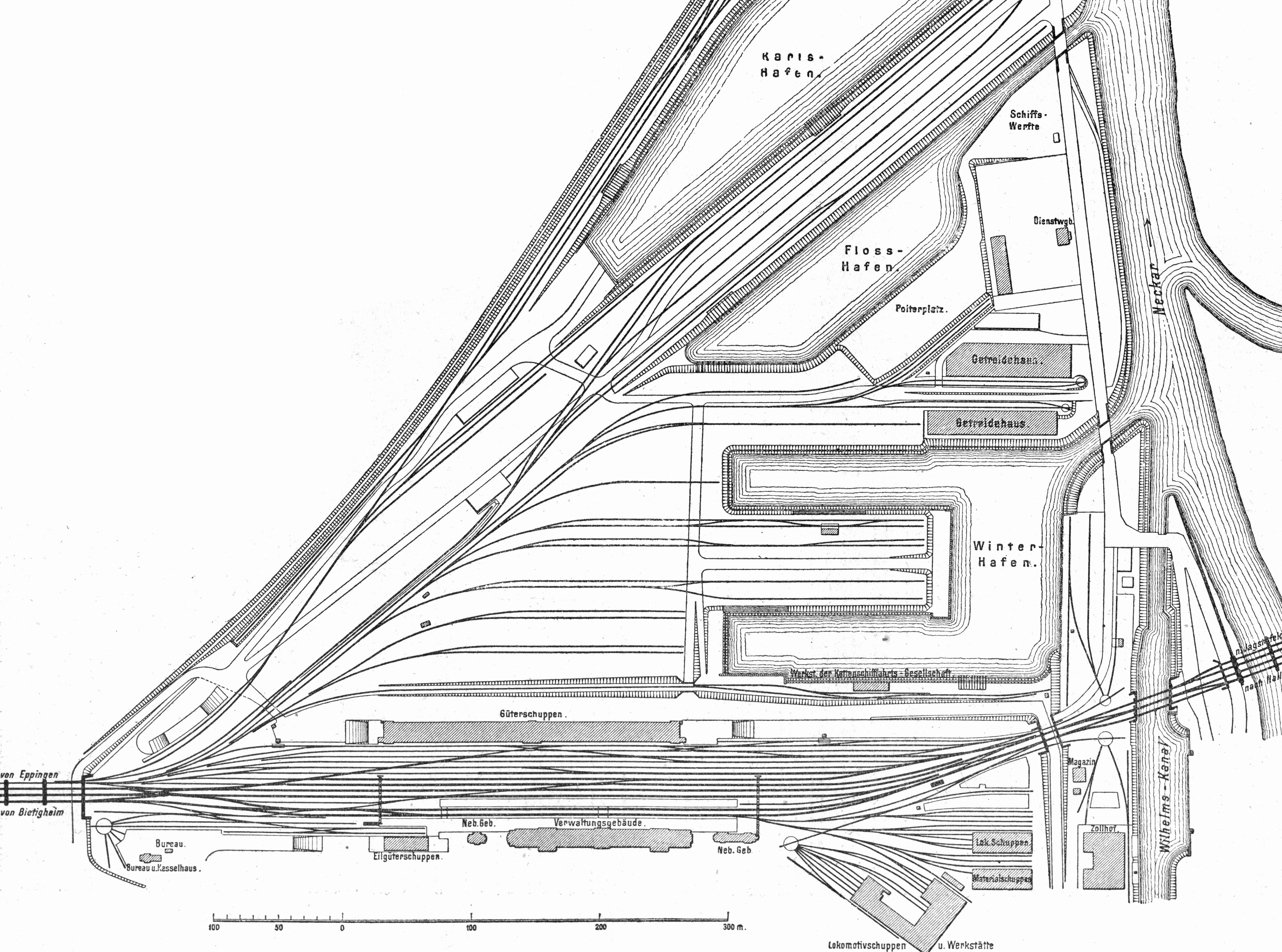
Plan of the Hauptbahnhof from 1895

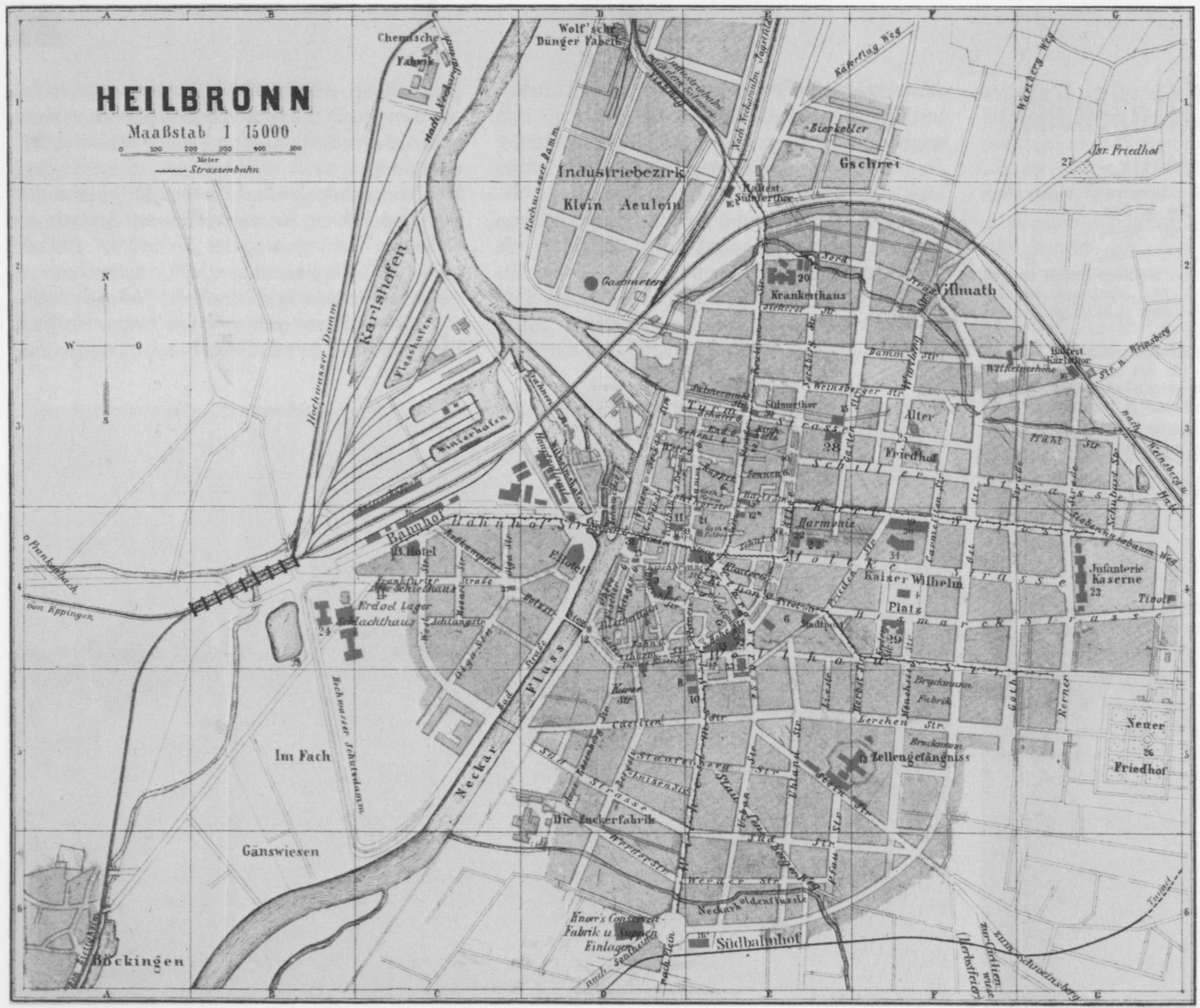
Street map showing station tracks in 1903

== Operations ==
Mühlacker station is classified by Deutsche Bahn as a category 2 station.

=== Lines ===
The station is served by the following lines:

- to Mannheim via Eberbach and Heidelberg (Neckar Valley Railway)
- to Heidelberg via Meckenheim (Elsenz Valley Railway)
- Öhringen–Heilbronn–Eppingen–Karlsruhe (Hohenlohe Railway and Kraichgau Railway)
- Öhringen–Heilbronn–Eppingen (–Karlsruhe–Achern) (Heilbronn/Karlsruhe Stadtbahn )
- Stuttgart–Heilbronn–Mosbach-Neckarelz / –Würzburg (Franconia Railway and Neckar Valley Railway )
- to Crailsheim via Öhringen and Schwäbisch Hall (Hohenlohe Railway)

=== Services ===
The following lines operate through Heilbronn Hauptbahnhof as of February 2023:

Line	Route			Frequency
ICE 13	Stuttgart → Heilbronn → Würzburg → Fulda → Berlin → Berlin Ostbahnhof			One train Fr, Sa
ICE 24	Stuttgart → Heilbronn → Würzburg → Fulda → Hannover → Hamburg → Hamurg-Altona			One train Sa
RB 8	(Lauda – Osterburken –) Bad Friedrichshall – Heilbronn – Ludwigsburg – Bietigheim-Bissingen – Stuttgart			Some trains
RE 8	(Würzburg –) Lauda – Osterburken – Bad Friedrichshall – Heilbronn – Ludwigsburg – Bietigheim-Bissingen – Stuttgart			60 min
RE 10a	Heilbronn – Bad Friedrichshall	– Mosbach Neckarelz	– Neckargemünd – Heidelberg – Mannheim	60 min
RE 10b	Heilbronn – Bad Friedrichshall	– Sinsheim	– Neckargemünd – Heidelberg – Mannheim	60 min
MEX 18	Heilbronn – Bad Friedrichshall – Osterburken			Some trains
MEX 18	Heilbronn → Weinsberg → Öhringen			One train
RE 80	Heilbronn – Weinsberg – Öhringen – Schwäbisch Hall-Hessental	– Crailsheim		120 min
RB 83	Heilbronn – Weinsberg – Öhringen – Schwäbisch Hall-Hessental			120 min
RE 45	Heilbronn – Eppingen – Bretten – Karlsruhe			60 min
MEX 12	(Tübingen – Reutlingen – Plochingen –) Stuttgart – Ludwigsburg – Bietigheim-Bissingen – Heilbronn (– Bad Friedrichshall	– Mosbach-Neckarelz)		60 min
MEX 18	(Tübingen – Reutlingen – Plochingen –) Stuttgart – Ludwigsburg – Bietigheim-Bissingen – Heilbronn (– Bad Friedrichshall	– Osterburken)		60 min
MEX 18	Öhringen → Heilbronn → Bietigheim-Bissingen → Ludwigsburg → Stuttgart → Plochingen → Reutlingen → Tübingen			One train
On the station forecourt/Willy-Brandt-Platz
S 4	((Karlsruhe – Bretten – Eppingen –) Schwaigern – Leingarten –) Heilbronn Hbf/Willy–Brandt–Platz (– Heilbronn Pfühlpark (– Weinsberg (– Willsbach – Eschenau (– Öhringen))))			20 – 30 min
S 41	Heilbronn Hbf/Willy-Brandt-Platz – Neckarsulm – Bad Friedrichshall	– Mosbach-Neckarelz (– Mosbach)		60 min
S 42	Heilbronn Hbf/Willy-Brandt-Platz – Neckarsulm – Bad Friedrichshall	– Bad Rappenau (– Sinsheim)		30 min

This creates a 20-minute cycle on the Heilbronn – Stuttgart and Heilbronn – Bad Friedrichshall sections (excluding S 41 and S 42).

== Gallery ==
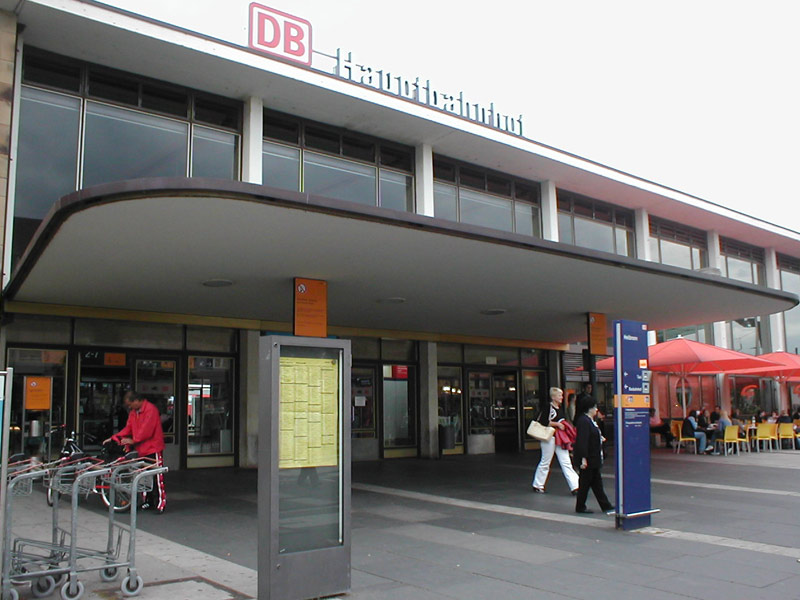
Station canopy

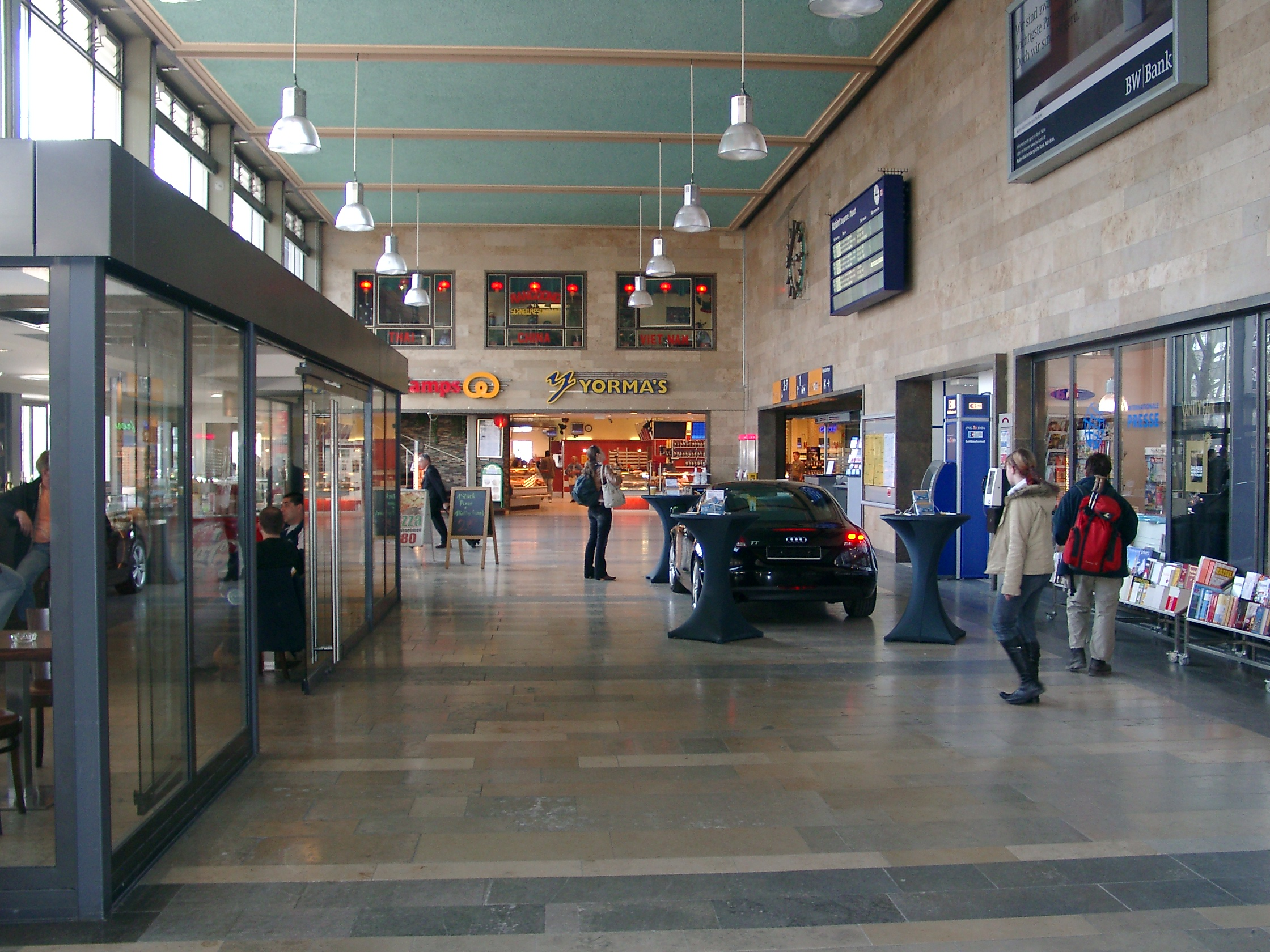
Station hall

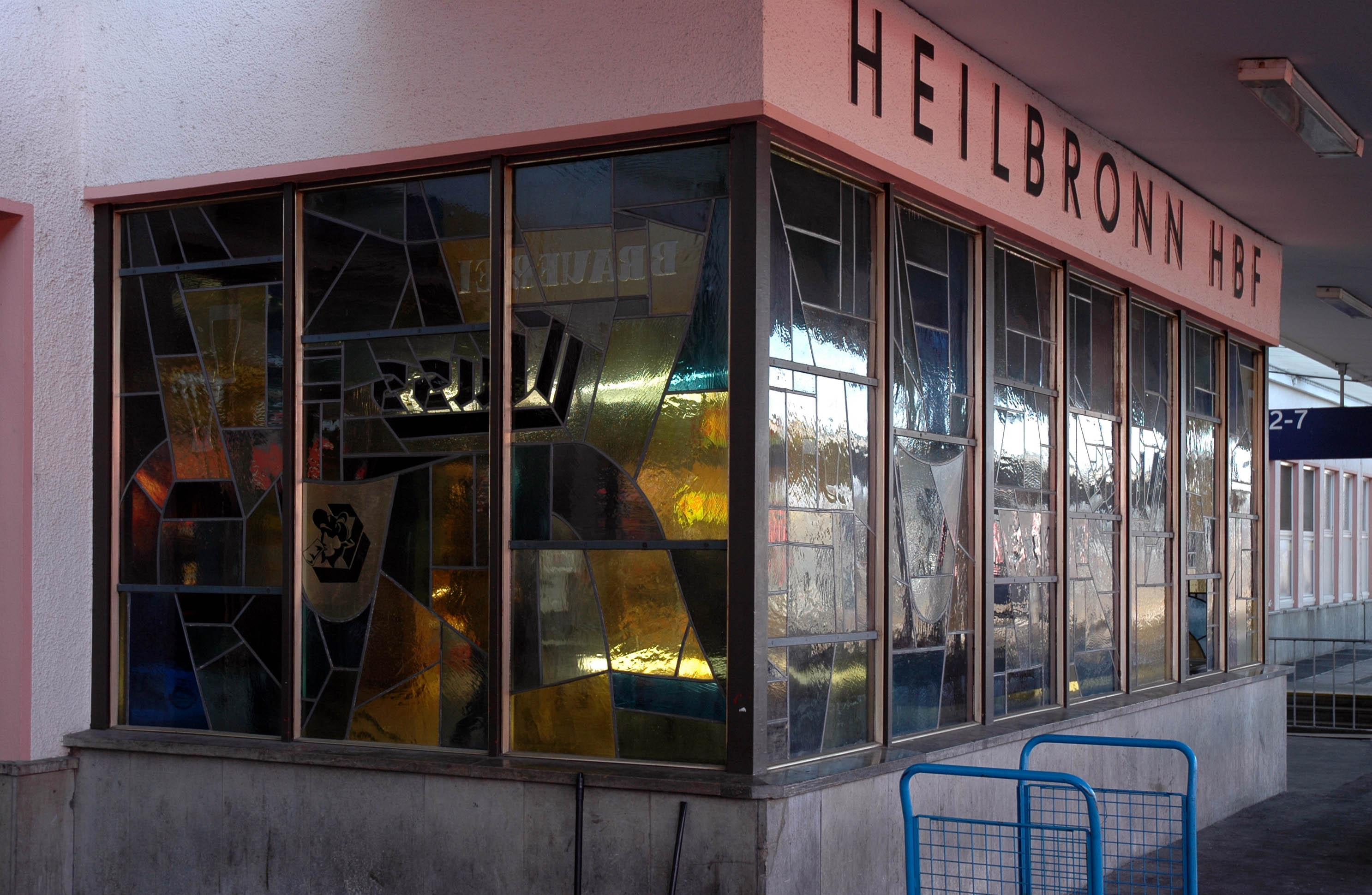
Stained glass window at the entrance to the underpass

== See also ==
- Rail transport in Germany
- Railway stations in Germany
