= Crailsheim–Heilbronn railway =

Railway line in Germany

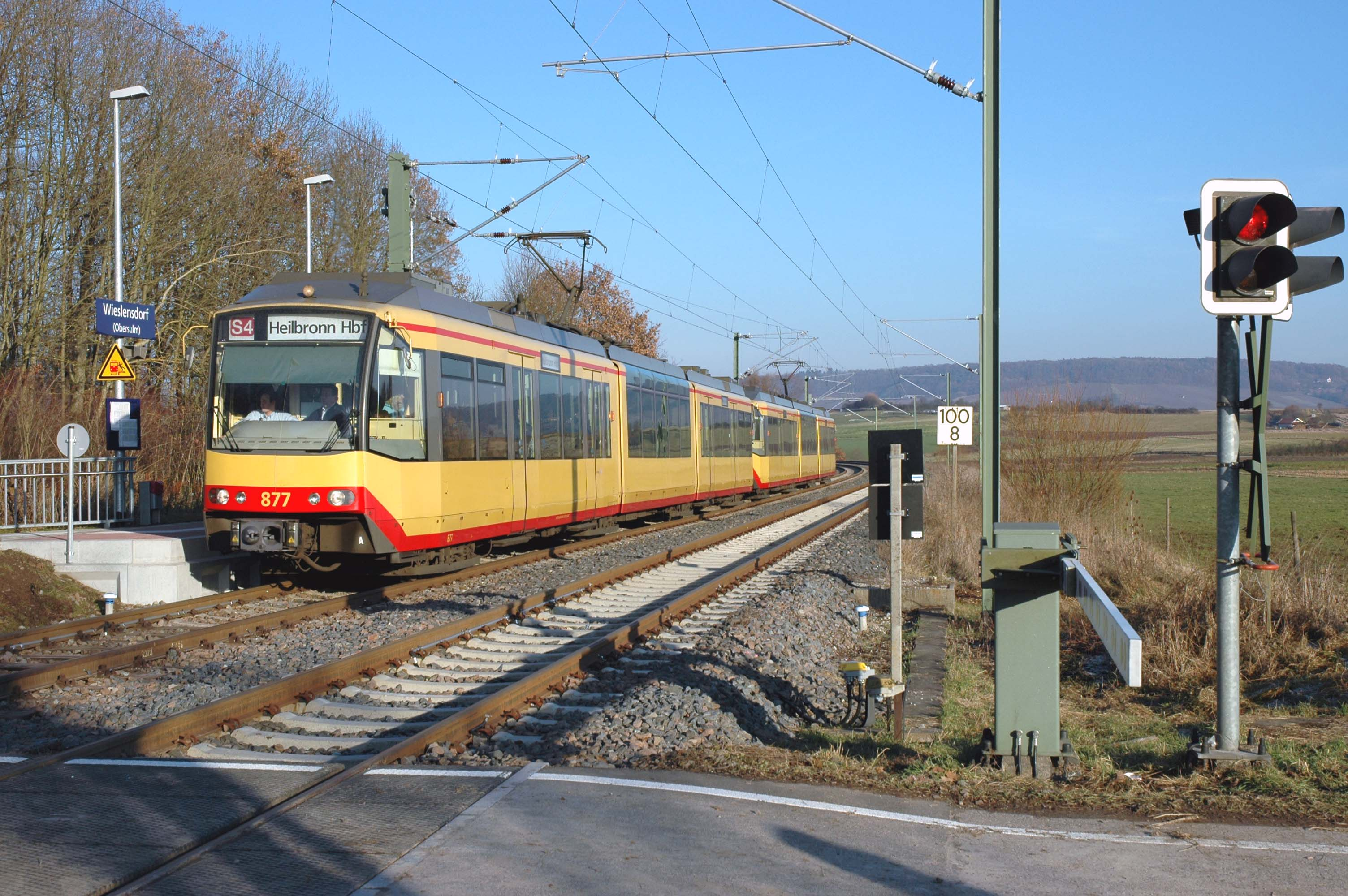
- Stadtbahn train at Wieslensdorf Halt

Overview
- Other name: Hohenlohe Railway
- Native name: Hohenlohebahn
- Status: Operational
- Owner: Deutsche Bahn
- Line number: 4950
- Locale: Baden-Württemberg, Germany
- Termini: Crailsheim; Heilbronn Hbf.
- Stations: 26

Service
- Type: Heavy rail, Passenger rail Regional rail, Commuter rail
- Route number: 783; 710.4 (Karlsruhe Stadtbahn); 710.42 (Heilbronn Stadtbahn)
- Operator(s): DB Bahn

History
- Opened: Stages between 1862–1867

Technical
- Line length: 88.1 km (54.7 mi)
- Track gauge: 1,435 mm (4 ft 8 1/2 in) standard gauge
- Electrification: 15 kV/16.7 Hz AC Overhead line (Öhringen-Cappel – Heilbronn Hbf.)
Route map
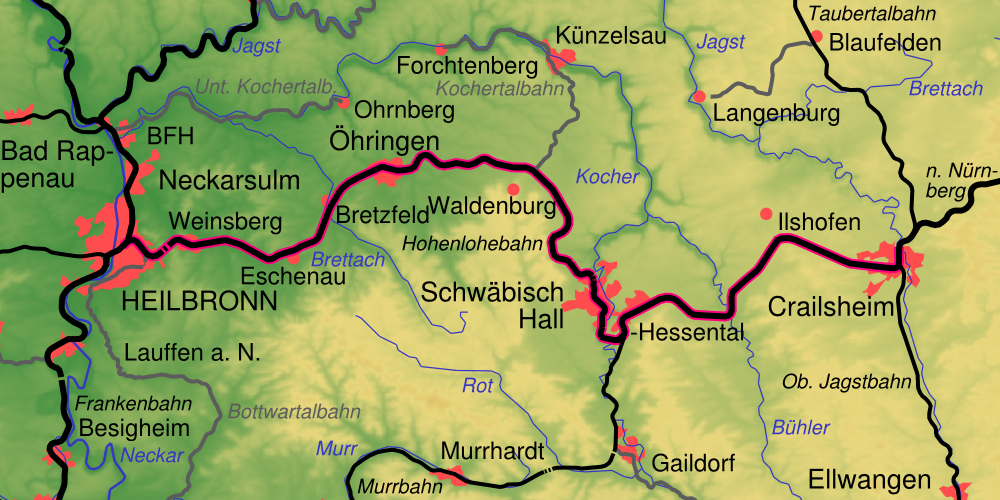
- Source: German railway atlas

The Crailsheim–Heilbronn railway (also called the Hohenlohebahn—"Hohenlohe Railway"—and called the Kocher Railway in the time of the Royal Württemberg State Railways) is a double-tracked, main line railway in southwest Germany that runs from Heilbronn, crossing the Hohenlohe region.

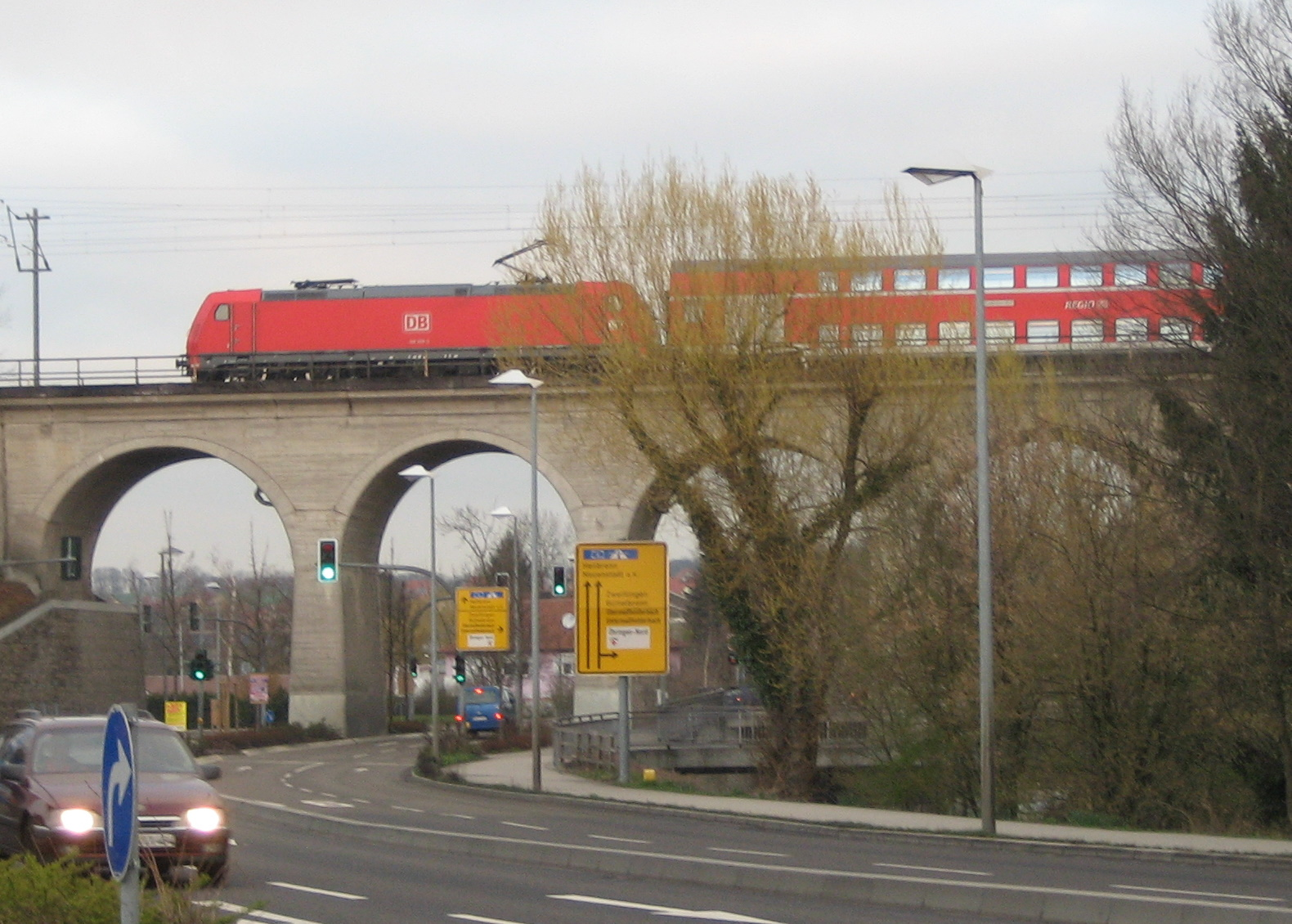
Regional Express with double-deck coach on the Öhringen Viaduct

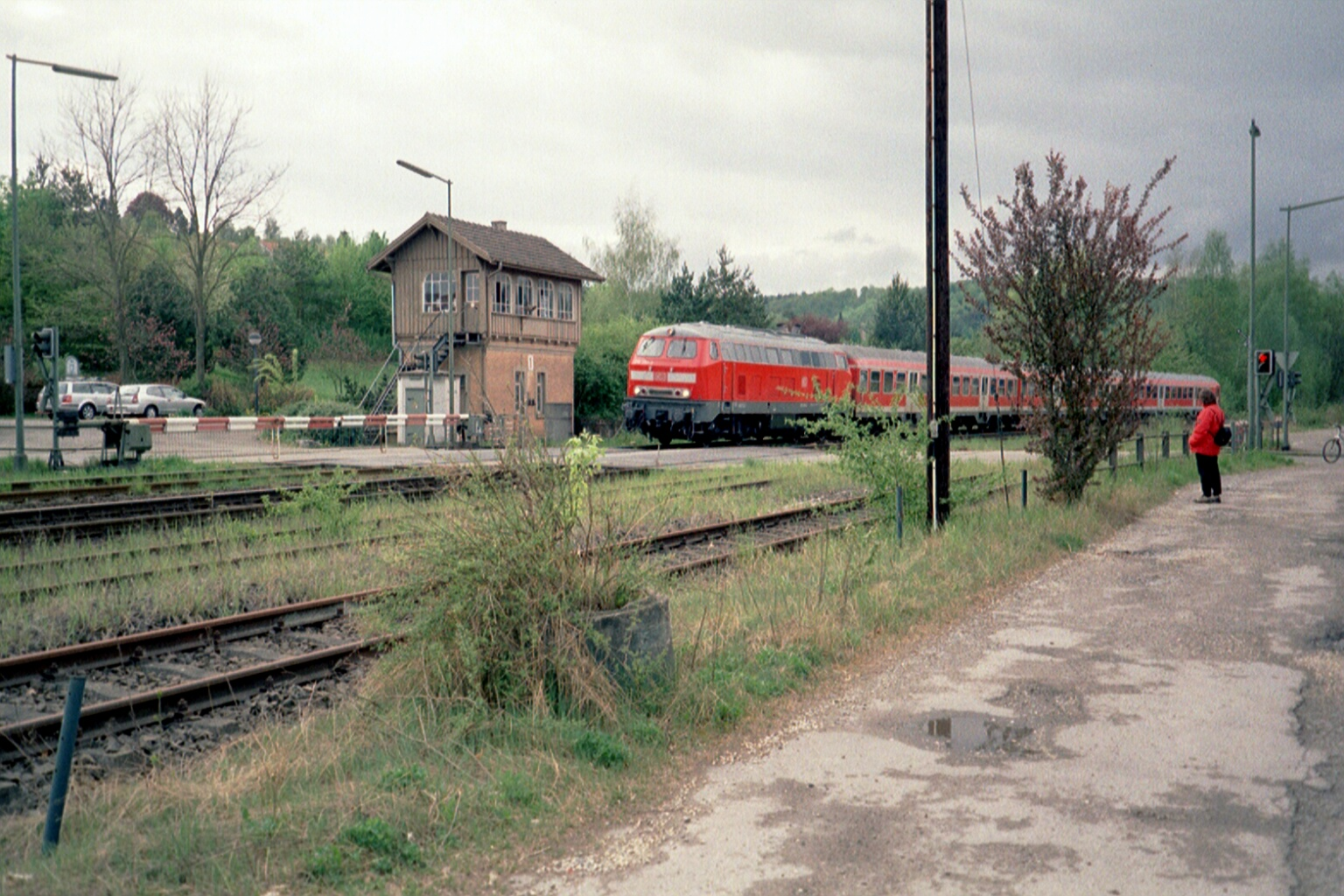
Level crossing in Weinsberg in 2003, before electrification

== History ==
In February and March 1857, the towns of Crailsheim, Heilbronn, Künzelsau and Weinsberg petitioned the King and the Estates of Württemberg to be linked by a railway. In April, the Wurttemberg Chamber of Deputies recommended the construction of a railway line on the Heilbronn–Crailsheim–Nuremberg route. In May 1858, the Estates supported a route via Weinsberg and Öhringen to Crailsheim. This variant, proposed at a formal meeting of the Oberamt (district) of Weinsberg and by the people of the Weinberg valley, was the longest of three considered and, because it required the construction of the 891 m long Weinberg tunnel between Heilbronn and Weinberg, was much more expensive but had the advantage that all the major places in the Weinberg valley, including importantly Weinberg, could be connected to each other. The Heilbronn–Schwäbisch Hall section was opened on 4 August 1862 and the Schwäbisch Hall–Crailsheim section was opened on 10 December 1867. Planning and construction of the line were supervised by Carl Julius Abel. The original single-track line was duplicated between 1887 and 1890.

In 1879 the Murr Valley Railway was connected to the Kocher Railway in the then neighboring town of Hessental rather than to Schwäbisch Hall station. This was disadvantageous for Schwäbisch Hall as a trip to Stuttgart required a detour via Hessental. As a result, Hessental station became more important than Schwäbisch Hall station, although it is 4 km from the city centre.

== Development as a Stadtbahn route ==
Since December 2005, the Heilbronn Stadtbahn has run on the Hohenlohe line to Öhringen-Cappel. This service operates as line S4 of the Karlsruhe Stadtbahn. This section of the line was electrified for this service and eight new stations were built. To carry out this work at a lower cost the whole line between Öhringen and Heilbronn was closed between June 2003 and December 2005 and replaced by a bus service, avoiding the expenditure of €4 million, according to the DB. Despite this measure, there were repeated unplanned additional costs and delays in rebuilding the line.

Even after the development of the line for the Stadtbahn, Deutsche Bahn still operates the route, through its subsidiary Westfrankenbahn, with Regional-Express services between Heilbronn and Crailsheim, as well as Regionalbahn services between Öhringen and Crailsheim (with a change in Schwäbisch Hall-Hessental). The Stadtbahn between Heilbronn and Öhringen is operated by Albtal-Verkehrs-Gesellschaft, using Stadtbahn electric multiple units of GT8-100C/2S and GT8-100D/2S-M classes. The Regional-Express services have used railcars of class 642 since December 2008 and Regionalbahn services between Öhringen and Schwäbisch Hall-Hessental continue to use class 628 diesel multiple units, which previously also ran between Heilbronn and Öhringen. Between Heilbronn and Öhringen there is and additional pair of locomotive-hauled trains in the morning rush hour.

== Freight ==
Since the re-opening of the line between Öhringen and Heilbronn in December 2005, wagons are shunted daily between the factory of the Öhringen packaging manufacturer Huber and Heilbronn. In addition, freight trains run between Crailsheim and Hessental on the Nuremberg–Kornwestheim marshalling yard (Stuttgart) route.

== Heilbronn Stadtbahn inner city line ==
Between Heilbronn Trappensee and Heilbronn Karlstor stations the ramp to the Heilbronn Stadtbahn inner city line branches off. After the Stadtbahn stop in the forecourt of Heilbronn Hauptbahnhof, the Stadtbahn runs over a level crossing of the Franconia Railway on to the Kraichgau Railway to Karlsruhe.

== Patronage ==
According to surveys of Albtal-Verkehrs-Gesellschaft in 2008, 13,400 passengers use the Stadtbahn daily on the route between Heilbronn and Öhringen. The patronage of DB Regio was around 700 passengers a day; in 2002, before the launch of the Stadtbahn, it was 585.

== Future ==
An extension of Stadtbahn from Öhringen-Cappel to Waldenburg or Schwäbisch Hall is being considered. A connection to Künzelsau via Waldenburg was being examined in 2008.

== Sources ==
- Bindewald, Klaus (2005). Die Stadtbahn Heilbronn: Schienenverkehr zwischen Eppingen und Öhringen (in German). Ubstadt-Weiher: Verlag Regionalkultur. ISBN 3-89735-416-0.
- Schrenk, Christhard (1987). Mit dem Dampfross vom Neckar zum Kocher: 125 Jahre Eisenbahnlinie Heilbronn-Schwäbisch Hall (in German). Heilbronn: Stadtarchiv Heilbronn. ISBN 3-928990-31-4.
