= Westfrankenbahn =

Overview
- Owner: Deutsche Bahn AG
- Website: www.westfrankenbahn.de

Service
- Services: Aschaffenburg–Miltenberg; Miltenberg West–Wertheim; Crailsheim–Königshofen line; Lauda–Wertheim line; Seckach–Miltenberg; Hohenlohebahn; Frankenbahn; Kahl–Schöllkrippen
- Depot(s): Schöllkrippen
- Rolling stock: 44 Baureihe 642, 7 of them at Kahlgrundbahn
- Daily ridership: c. 16,200 including Kahlgrundbahn
- Ridership: 3,600,000 km (2,200,000 mi) annually

Technical
- Line length: 371 km (231 mi), with 206 km (128 mi) using its own infrastructure
- Track gauge: 1,435 mm (4 ft 8 1/2 in) standard gauge

The Westfrankenbahn (WFB for short) is a RegioNetz of the Deutsche Bahn AG based in Aschaffenburg.

== History ==
The Westfrankenbahn was founded on January 1, 2006. The company leased the Aschaffenburg–Miltenberg line between Aschaffenburg Süd and Miltenberg, the Miltenberg West–Wertheim line, the Lauda–Wertheim line, the Crailsheim–Königshofen line and the Seckach–Miltenberg line. In addition, the Westfrankenbahn operates passenger trains on the routes Crailsheim–Heilbronn and Lauda–Königshofen. Since December 13, 2015, the Kahl–Schöllkrippen line has also been part of it. While no services have been provided on the Würzburg–Lauda section since December 2018, individual trains have been running between Lauda and Osterburken since then and continue to Heilbronn until December 2019. The total length of travel traveled by Westfrankenbahn is 401 kilometres (249 mi), of which 204 kilometres (127 mi) are on the company's own infrastructure. Annually, the line provides a total of 3.6 million kilometers of rail transport.

In 2016, however, freight traffic only took place on the northern routes. The port in Wertheim is served regularly. Freight trains also run to Obernburg-Elsenfeld, Miltenberg, Kleinheubach and Gamburg.

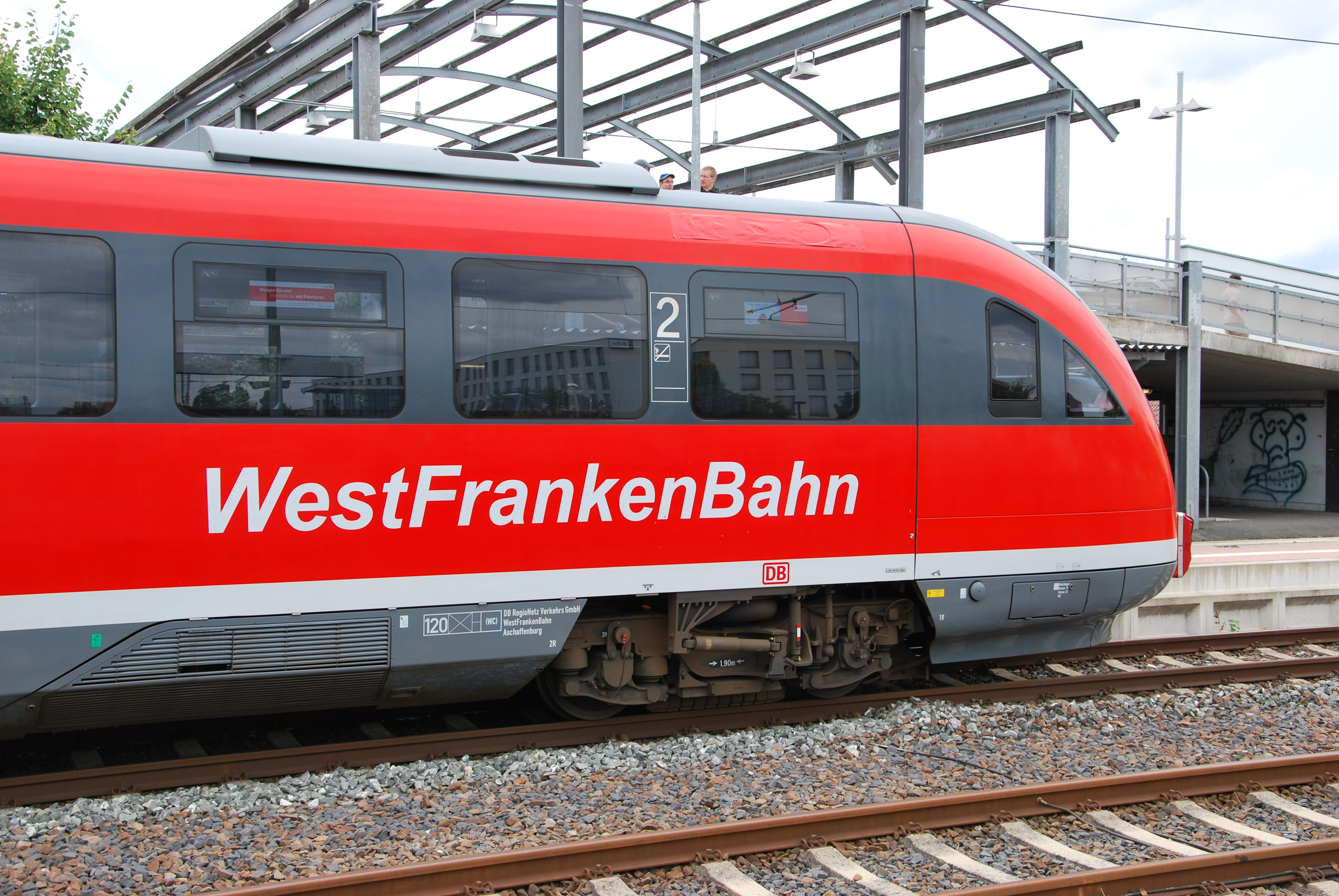
Class 642 of Westfrankenbahn

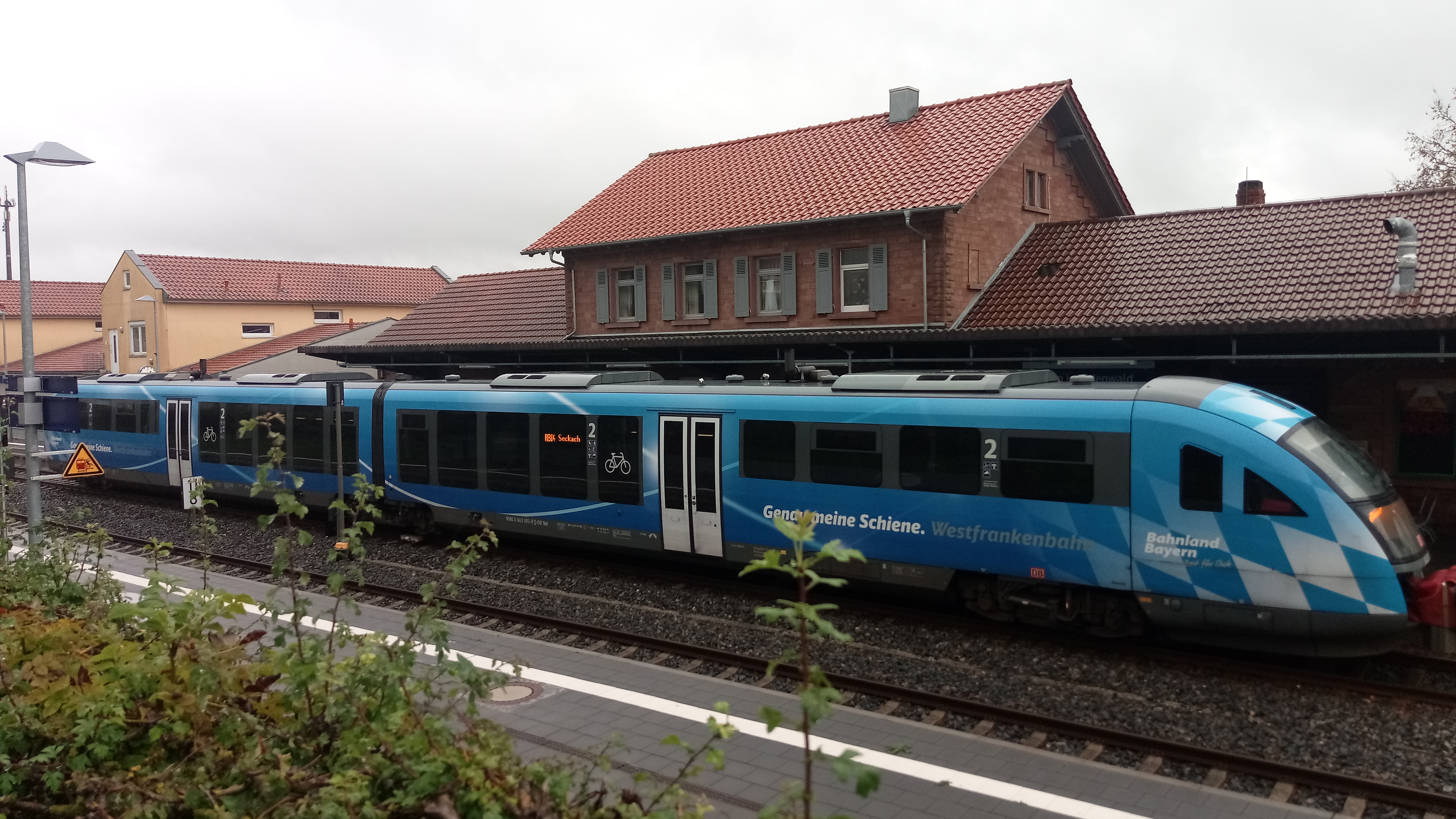
Class 642 at Buchen station

== Lines ==
Line	Route	KBS	Time (in min) (as of 2021)
RE 80	Heilbronn Hbf – Öhringen Hbf – Schwäbisch Hall-Hessental – Crailsheim	783, 785	120 (with RB 83 Stundentakt Schwäbisch Hall-Hessental – Öhringen Hbf/Heilbronn Hbf)
RB 83	Schwäbisch Hall-Hessental – Öhringen Hbf (– Heilbronn Hbf)	783	120 (Öhringen–Heilbronn nur Mo–Fr, zusammen mit RE 80 Stundentakt Schwäbisch Hall-Hessental – Öhringen Hbf/Heilbronn Hbf)
RB 84	Miltenberg – Walldürn – Seckach (– Osterburken)	784	60–120
RB 85	Osterburken – Lauda (– Würzburg Hbf)	780	60 (Mo–Fr); 120 (Sa+So)(together with DB Regio Bayern, only individual trains operated by the WFB)
RE 87	Crailsheim – Bad Mergentheim – Lauda – Tauberbischofsheim – Wertheim – Miltenberg – Aschaffenburg Hbf	781, 782	120; 60 (Mo–Fr Wertheim–Aschaffenburg) (together with RB 88 (BW) Mo–Fr hourly Wertheim–Lauda–Crailsheim)
RB 88 (BW)	Crailsheim – Bad Mergentheim – Lauda – Tauberbischofsheim – Wertheim	782	120 (Mo–Fr) (together with RE 87 hourly)
RB 88 (BY)	Miltenberg – Aschaffenburg Hbf	781	60

== Trains ==
The West Franconia Railway originally had 32 diesel railcars of the series 628, 10 diesel railcars of the series 642 and the diesel locomotive 218 105 available. Since 2016, 218460 has replaced the 218105–5, which has since been sold to NeSA. In December 2018, the company took over additional series 642 railcars from DB Regio, which were modernized and replaced the last units of the 628 series by December 2019. Today the WFB uses 44 class 642 railcars. On December 1, 2019, the farewell trip for the class 628 took place at the Westfrankenbahn, the remaining vehicles continued to be used in regular traffic until December 13. Some of the class 628.2 multiple units were handed over to Arriva in the Czech Republic in mid-2019, while those of class 628.4 were largely transferred to the Südostbayernbahn to Mühldorf and to the RAB were delivered to Ulm. In April 2022, the two mint turquoise/pastel turquoise/light grey painted VT 628 (Anna and Maria) returned to the Westfrankenbahn's inventory, having previously been used by the RAB.

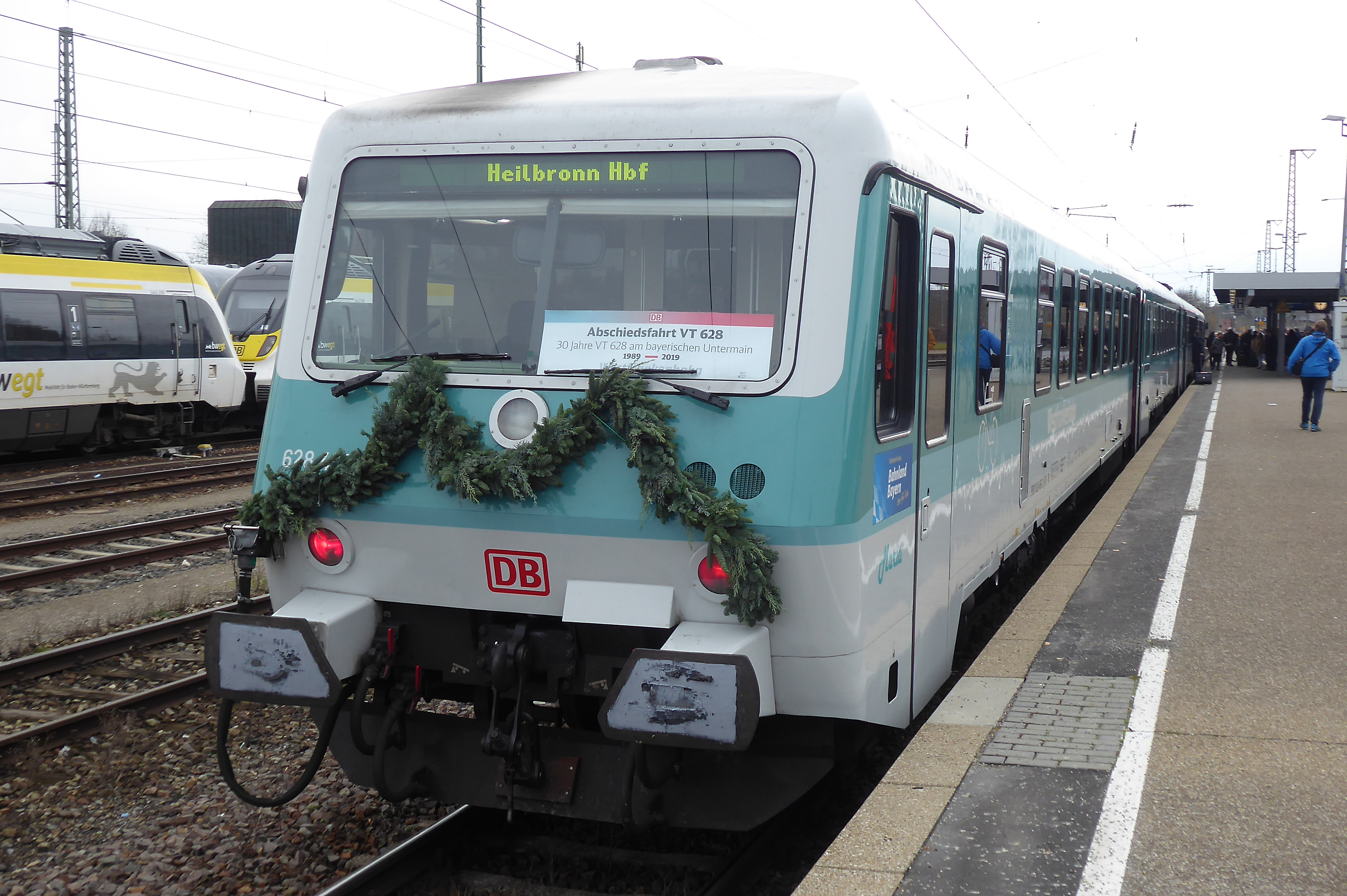
Last use of the 628 series on 1 December 2019

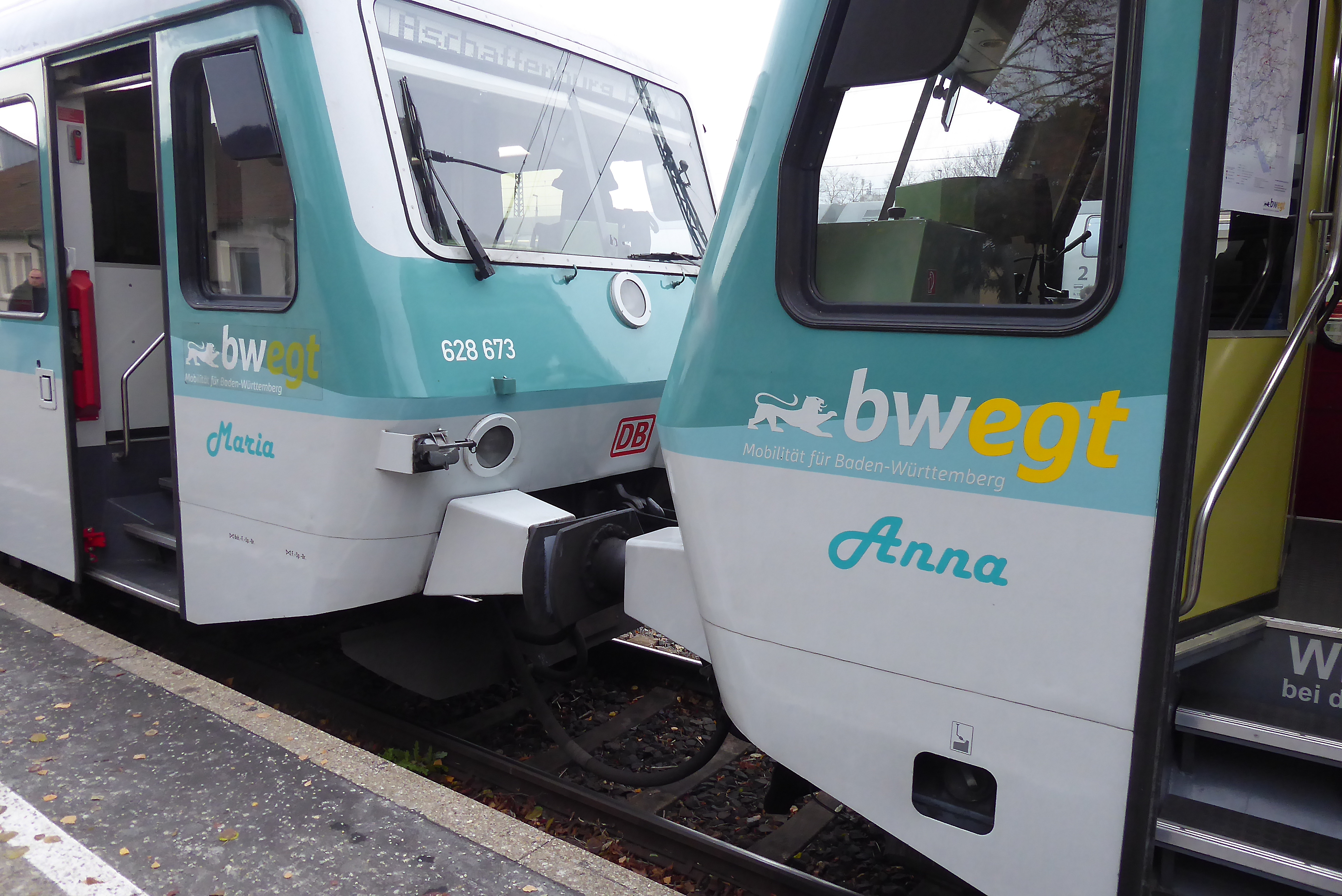
Anna and Maria

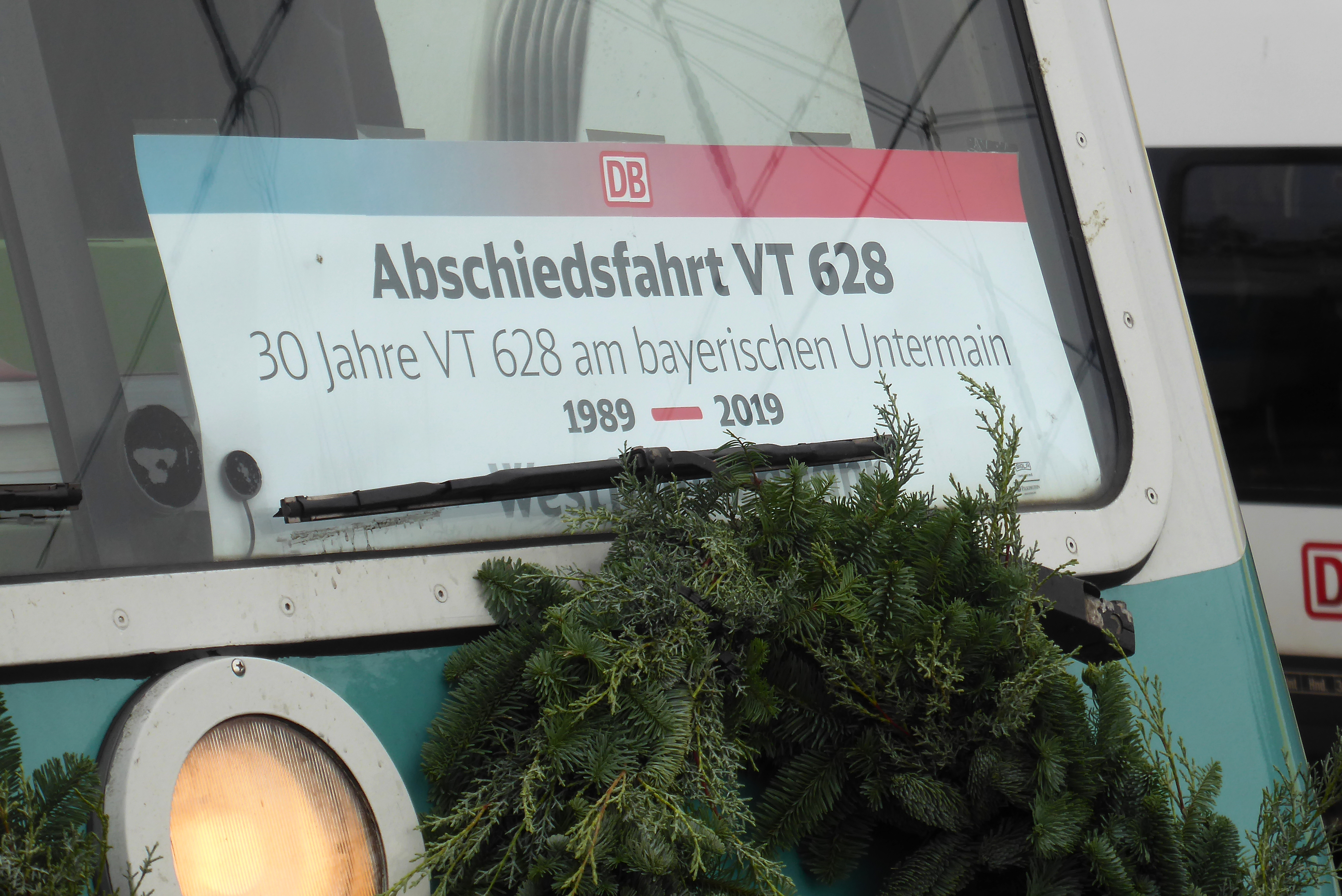
30 years of VT 628
