= Bad Wimpfen =

- Town
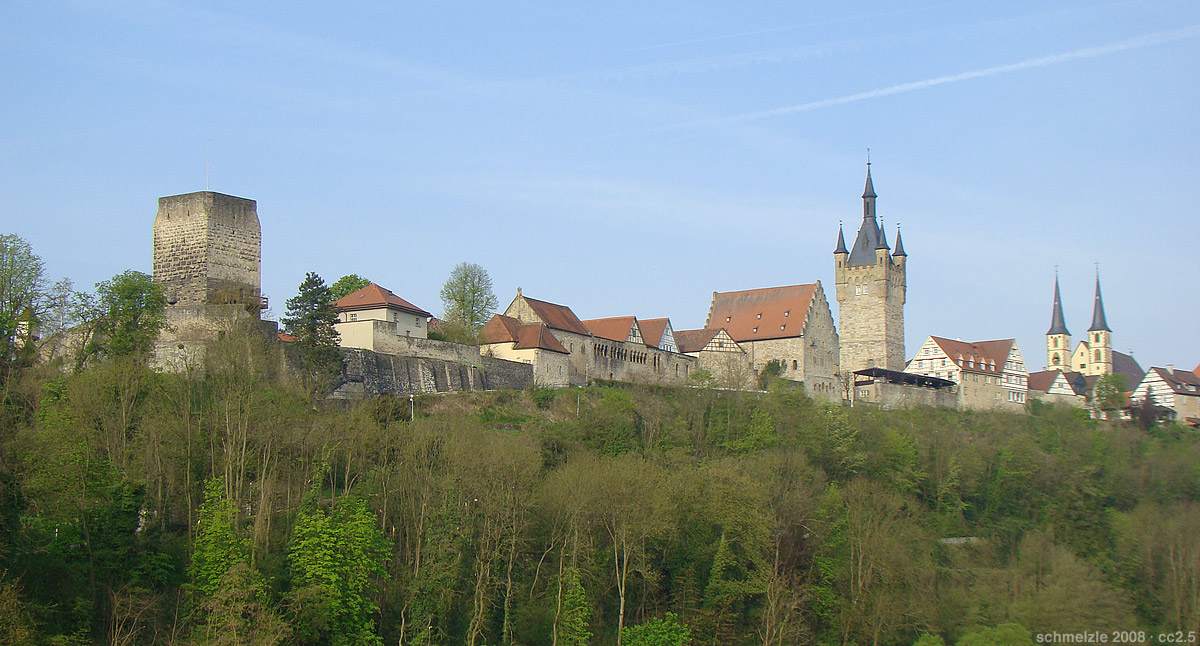

- Coat of arms

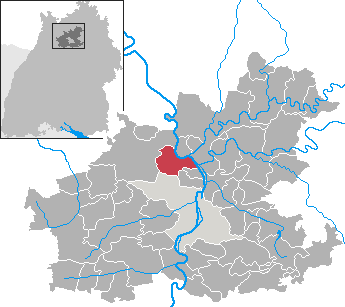
- Location of Bad Wimpfen within Heilbronn district
- Interactive map of Bad Wimpfen
- Location within Germany Location within Baden-Württemberg
- Coordinates: 49°14′N 9°10′E
- Country: Germany
- State: Baden-Württemberg
- District: Heilbronn
- Subdivisions: 3

Government
  - Mayor (2021–29): Andreas Zaffran

Area
  - Total: 19.38 km^{2} (7.48 sq mi)
- Elevation: 195 m (640 ft)

Population (2025-12-31)
  - Total: 7,725
  - Density: 398.6/km^{2} (1,032/sq mi)
- Time zone: UTC+01:00 (CET)
  - Summer (DST): UTC+02:00 (CEST)
- Postal codes: 74206
- Dialling codes: 07063
- Vehicle registration: HN
- Website: www.badwimpfen.de

Bad Wimpfen (German: [baːt ˈvimpfn̩]) is a historic spa town in the district of Heilbronn in the Baden-Württemberg region of southern Germany. It lies north of the city of Heilbronn, on the river Neckar.

== Geography ==
Bad Wimpfen is located on the west bank of the River Neckar, around 15 kilometres (9 mi) north of Heilbronn. The town is divided into two parts: the older Wimpfen im Tal (Lower Wimpfen/ literally Wimpfen in the valley) situated on the Neckar, and Wimpfen am Berg (Upper Wimpfen/ literally Wimpfen on the hill) containing the town centre. Besides the town itself, the village Hohenstadt also belongs to Bad Wimpfen.

=== Neighbouring municipalities ===
Neighbouring town and municipalities of Bad Wimpfen are (clockwise from the south): Heilbronn, Bad Rappenau, Offenau, Bad Friedrichshall, Untereisesheim and Neckarsulm.

== History ==
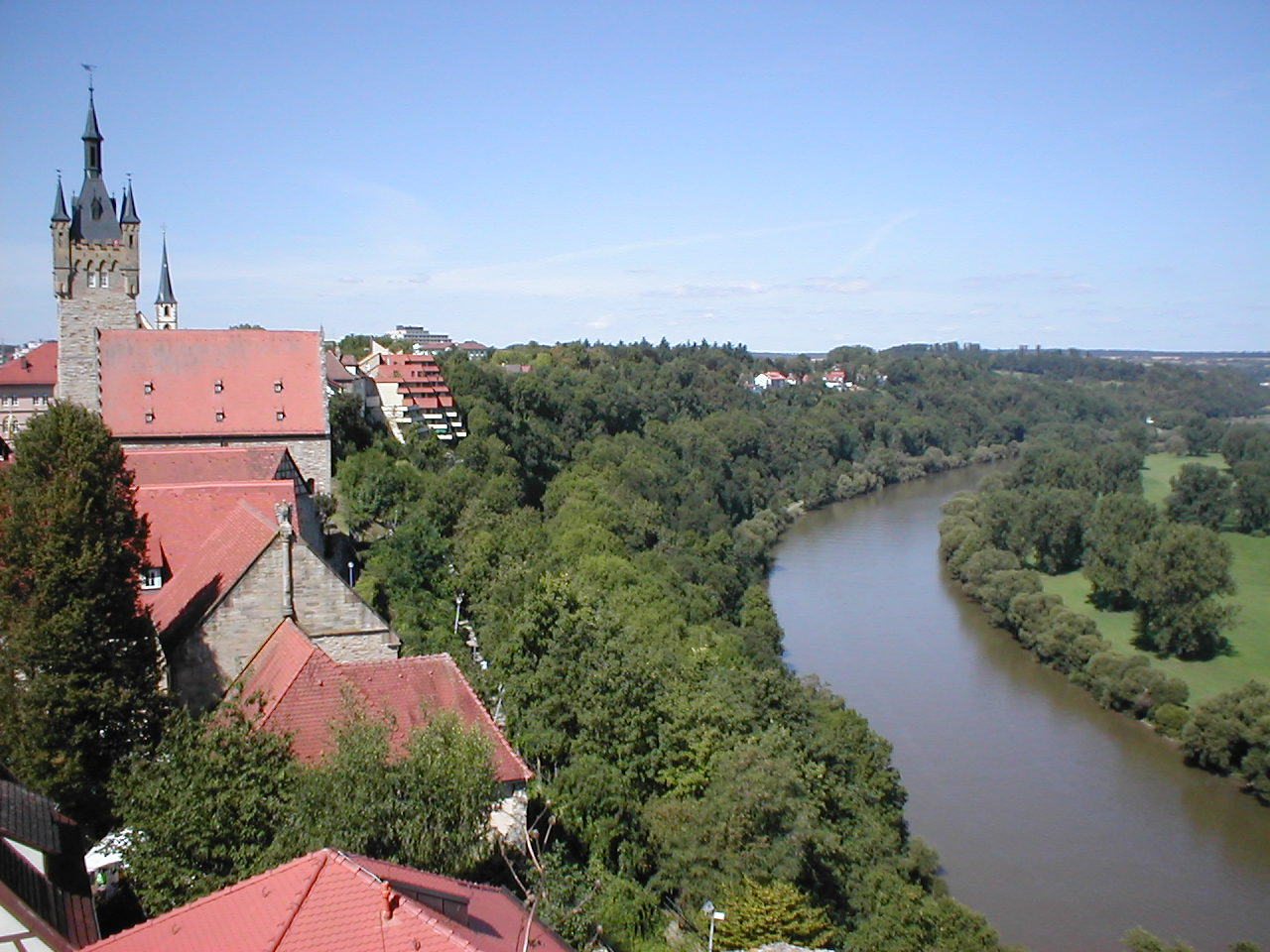
View from the Roter Turm (Red Tower) onto the castle quarter and the river bow

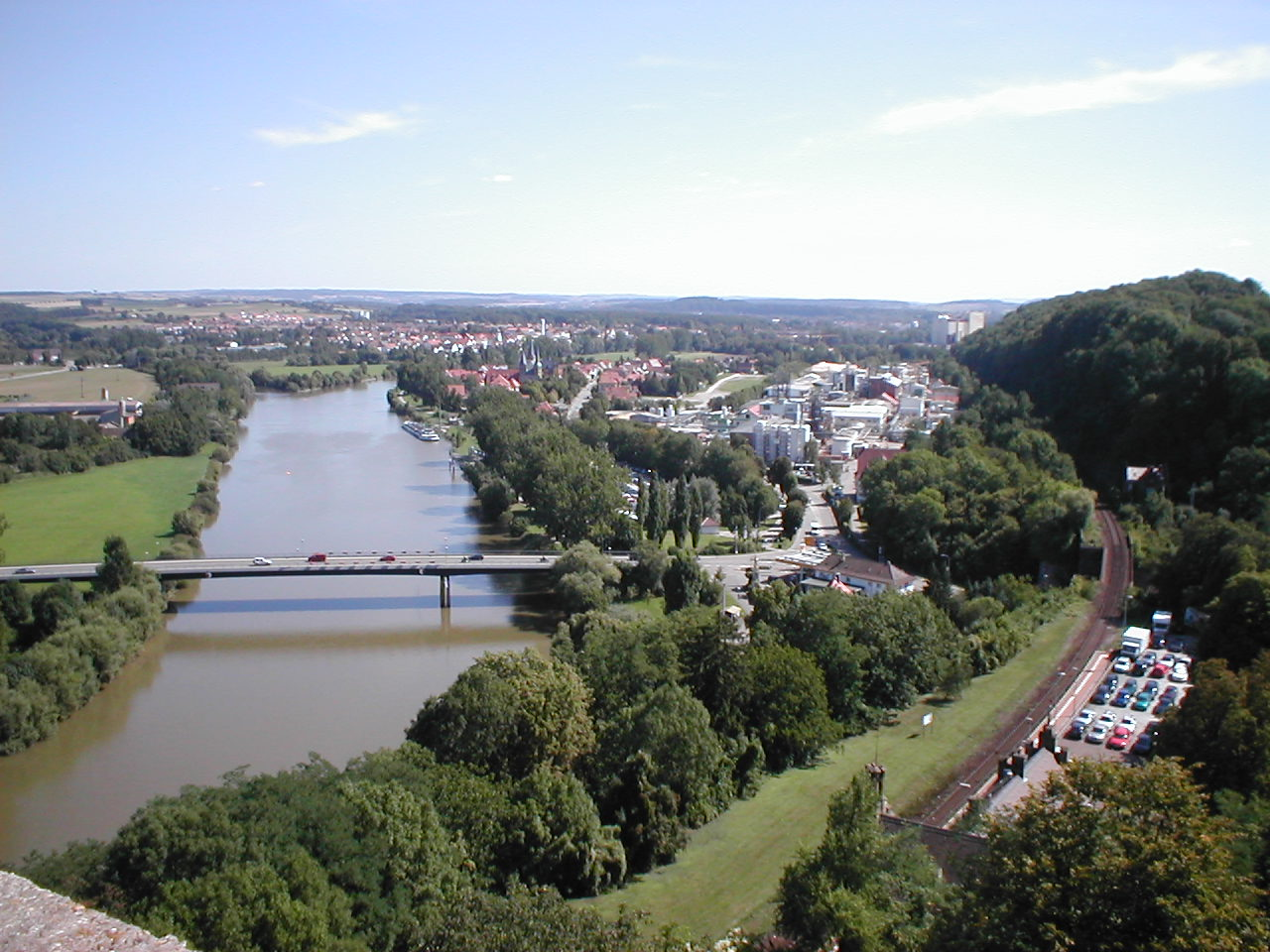
View from the Roter Turm (Red tower) onto Wimpfen im Tal

=== First settlement by the Celts ===
The first traces of settlement at Bad Wimpfen date from the Neolithic and the Bronze Age. An old trade road running from France forks here towards Nürnberg and Öhringen linking to the Danube. Several archaeological finds demonstrate that the route has existed since prehistoric times.

Around 450 B.C. the Celtic tribe of Helvetii settled around the Neckar, Kocher and Jagst, including the site of Bad Wimpfen. Presumably the Celts had given names to the rivers as they are today. Wimpfen presumably comes from "uimpe" (umwallt) = "surrounded" and "bin" (Berg) = "mountain".

=== Roman time ===
It is believed that around 98 A.D. the Romans secured the area in southwestern Germany conquered by Domitian (called the Agri Decumates) by the Upper Germanic-Rhaetian Limes, a system of castella built every 12 to 15 kilometres (7 to 9 mi). Opposite the Jagst mouth, the castellum of Wimpfen im Tal was created. As elsewhere, a civilian settlement formed around the castellum containing many traders and manual workers.

After the expansion of the Roman Empire up to the limes near Jagsthausen arranged by emperor Antoninus Pius in 138–161 A.D., the castellum lost its military importance.

All the more important was Wimpfen im Tal as a civilian town. It used to be the centre of a district called the Civitas Alisinensium and was surrounded by a city wall like only a few Roman towns in what is southern Germany today. With an area of about 19 hectares, Wimpfen was one of the biggest Roman towns in today's Baden-Württemberg. Despite this importance, the Latin name of the town is unknown today.

In addition, there was a wooden bridge above the Neckar which got destroyed by severe ice occurrence in the early Middle Ages. A beam salvaged during excavation works in 1957 was proved to have originated as part of the old bridge. A survey proved the origin to be around 85 A.D.

=== Development until Middle Ages ===
After the withdrawal of the Romans, the Alamanni governed the Neckar area from 260 A.D. During that time, most Roman buildings became dilapidated, since the Alamanni did not know anything about stone building and how to use Roman infrastructure. Around 500, Wimpfen became part of Franconia. During the settlement of the Franks under Clovis I, Christianity was flourishing, and today's oldest Christian buildings originate from this time.

In the 9th century, Wimpfen became part of the Bishopric of Worms; it was first mentioned documentary as Wimpina in 829. During that time the Hungarians attacked the region and devastated most settlements, including Wimpfen. Within the framework of the following reconstruction, the new parish church of St. Peter was built. Being a bigger building, it was dedicated to the patron of the Bishopric of Worms. During more than three centuries the local dioceses performed the jurisdiction there.

=== Growth of trade ===
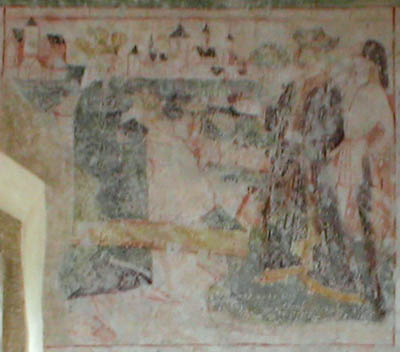
Wall drawings in the Duttenberg chapel from the 15th century show the oldest known view of Wimpfen.

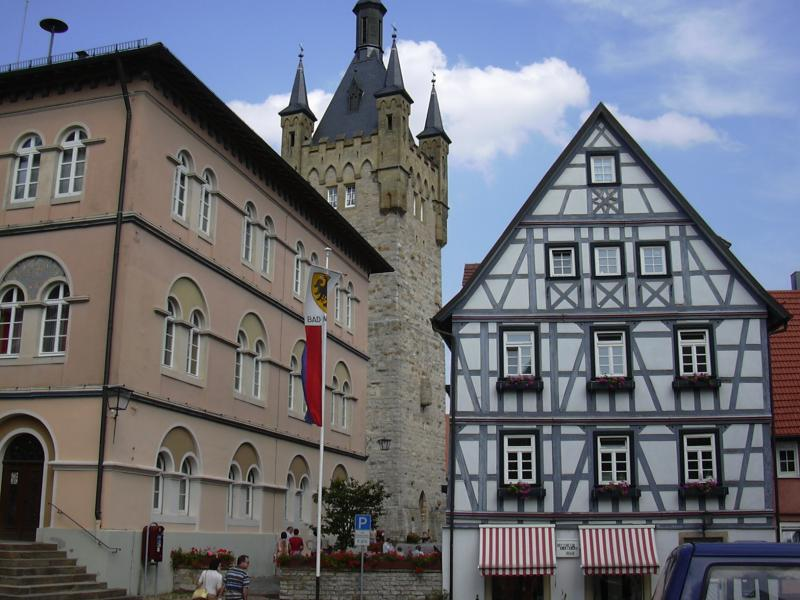
Blauer Turm (Blue Tower) and town hall on the left

In 965 a document dictated by King Otto I granted market rights to Wimpfen. Thanks to its good location in terms of transport and catchment area, the market developed significantly. Wimpfen's Talmarkt (valley market) has a history of more than 1000 years and is one of the longest running traditional market events in Germany.

In 1182 Frederick Barbarossa is believed to have stayed in Wimpfen. He had decentralised the administration of his empire. The Staufers had built Kaiserpfalzen (local castles) across the empire. These were big castles where local lords stayed and gave rulings. The Pfalz of Wimpfen was built on a rocky hill above the settlement of the Neckar Valley. The Pfalz and its surrounding settlement grew so strong that it outstripped the older settlement on the Neckar bank. By around 1200 most of the Staufer buildings had been built, including the Blauer Turm (Blue Tower), which is now generally seen as the town's principal visual landmark. It served as a watch-tower until the 20th century.

The Stauferpfalz of Wimpfen is the largest to be preserved north of the Alps. Its original length was about 215 metres (705 ft), its width about 88 metres (289 ft). Emperor Henry VI stayed there at least three times, Frederick II eight times. In 1235 there was a historical meeting between Frederick II and his rebellious son Henry. Also in the 13th century Richard von Deidesheim arranged a rebuilding of the diocesan church into the Gothic style. At the same time a hospital and a Dominican monastery was founded.

Due to the decline of the Staufers' Empire, Wimpfen became an imperial city, many manual workers settled there, and the population grew, establishing a large core of citizens. A town constitution was established, setting an example to many other towns. Many of today's buildings originate from this time.

Emperor Frederick III gave the right to hold a second annual market, the Katharinenmarkt, in addition to the established Talmarkt. This second market, held before Christmas, also survives in today's Christmas market, and its fame extends throughout the Baden-Württemberg region.

=== Times of Reformation ===
In the 16th century Wimpfen was a focal point of the Reformation. Probably the most important reformer was Erhard Schnepf who preached here from 1523 to 1526. His contemporary Heinrich Vogtherr wrote many reforming essays and hymns. Although the Catholics offered huge resistance to the Reformation, their influence and number decreased. By 1588 there were only 30 Catholic inhabitants. Catholics eventually lost their civil rights and their churches were converted to Protestant use.

=== Thirty Years' War ===
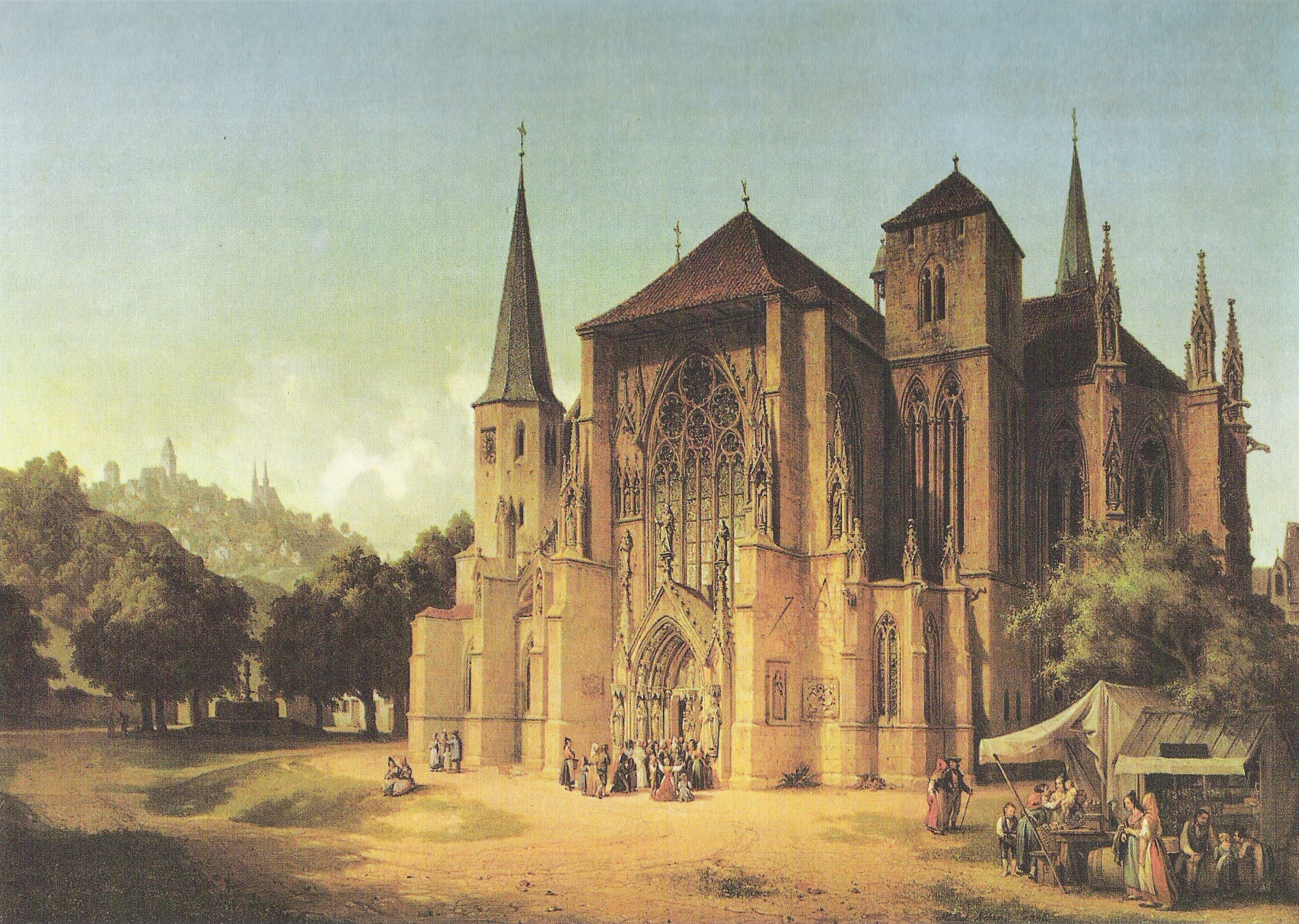
Wimpfen im Tal, St. Peter parish church, Wimpfen am Berg in the background, Michael Neher, 1846

This religious conflict soon grew less important, as the imperial troops of the Count of Tilly fought against the army of Margrave Georg Friedrich of Baden-Durlach in 1622 near the town. This Battle of Wimpfen was one of the most important and bloody ones during Thirty Years' War.

During this period Wimpfen was sacked several times, and houses and fields were burned. The population decreased radically due to disease and pestilence. At the end of the war, in 1648, the population had been reduced to a tenth of its pre-war size. Many important buildings were destroyed in this period, and redevelopment brought about loss of large parts of the castle which was used for building materials.

The town suffered the devastating consequences of the Thirty Years' War for more than 150 years. Although the Celts had extracted salt since pre-Christian times, there was now no possibility to produce salt. There was huge poverty within the population. During this time the town got financial aid from Nuremberg.

In 1783 it was declared that the removal of wood from surrounding forests was to be taxed to improve the town's financial situation. However, the citizens could not afford these fees. Consequently, there were many riots, but ultimately these were suppressed by local orders.

Originally, in terms of administration, by the Reichsdeputationshauptschluss the town was part of Baden. However, the knightly diocese of Wimpfen im Tal belonged to Hesse-Darmstadt. Consequently, a conflict about sovereignty rights over the parish increased between Baden and Hesse. Finally Baden agreed to cede the area, since their own territory was far away – and so Wimpfen under Hessian rule. This change was officially proclaimed on April 5, 1803. Starting in 1805–1806 Wimpfen was an outlying town under the control of Hesse.

For Wimpfen, this was a very comfortable situation as it was able to administer itself autonomously. At the time of the foundation of the People's State of Hesse in 1919, Wimpfen became part of the district of Heppenheim. It was merged with the district of Bensheim in 1938 and given the status of Kreis Bergstraße. In total, Wimpfen belonged to Hesse for 140 years. In 1945 the American military government reorganised administrational areas, and Bad Wimpfen came again under the reign of Baden (Nord-Württemberg Nord-Baden).

=== Salt production and bathing ===
In 1752 the first bore-holes were drilled for salt-water.

In 1817 a permanent salt production works was established. The brine was usually able to be used therapeutically, and in 1835 the first therapeutic hotel opened (Mathilden Spa Hotel). A new economic prosperity began, and a new town hall was built in 1836. Many of the older Staufer buildings were destroyed at this time or fell into disrepair or disuse.

After the opening of the new rail road, running from Heilbronn to Heidelberg, in the 1860s, the spa business increased greatly. Therapeutic baths were expanded more and more, resulting in a major economic growth. Even Mark Twain reported this fact within accounts of his journey through Europe in 1867. On April 26, 1930, the town got its prefix Bad officially.

The town survived World War II almost undamaged, and many refugees came here for accommodation.

=== Between Hesse and Baden-Württemberg ===
On September 19, 1945, the American military government proclaimed the foundation of Greater Hesse and Württemberg-Baden. Now the area was completely surrounded by Württemberg-Baden, namely by the districts of Sinsheim and Heilbronn belonging to Baden area of Württemberg. On November 26 the occupying American officials decided to transfer control of Wimpfen to the district of Sinsheim. Eventually the town legally became a part of Württemberg-Baden, this being confirmed by the OLG in Stuttgart on March 6, 1951.

Among local people, this decision was not well received. Even Hesse demanded a return of its enclave. In a plebiscite held on April 29, 1951, only 0.7% of the inhabitants voted to stay in the district of Sinsheim. Around 41% voted to return to Hesse, but a majority of 57% decided to change into the district of Heilbronn. This change to Heilbronn was carried out on May 1, 1952.

Despite this result, Hesse persisted in its opinion that Bad Wimpfen was a Hessian town. However, it agreed that the newly founded state of Baden-Württemberg should administer the town. This means that the final status of any affiliation remains unclear even today. However, Bad Wimpfen is completely integrated into the administration and jurisdiction of Baden-Württemberg.

Due to its Hessian past, the Catholic Church still belongs as an exclave to the Diocese of Mainz.

=== Present ===
The present-day town of Bad Wimpfen is impressive both due to its various spa institutions and its numerous fine historic buildings. The historical old part of the town is completely protected. Since 1976 a comprehensive program of redevelopment resulted in an important restoration of most buildings. Due to the recession of the 1990s, private initiatives have now superseded the earlier state interventions, but generally the pace of development has decreased and settled.

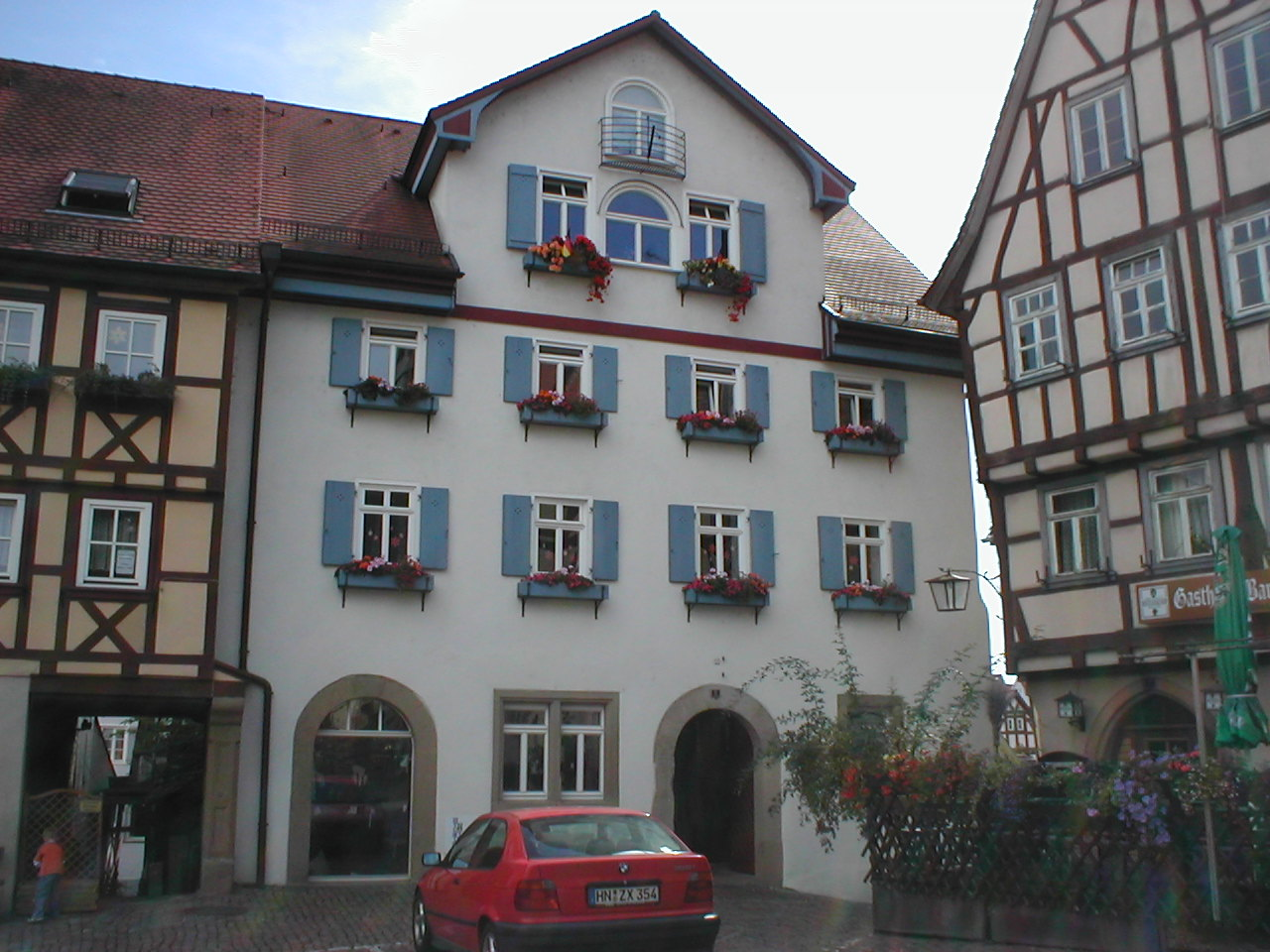
Older timbering of 1266

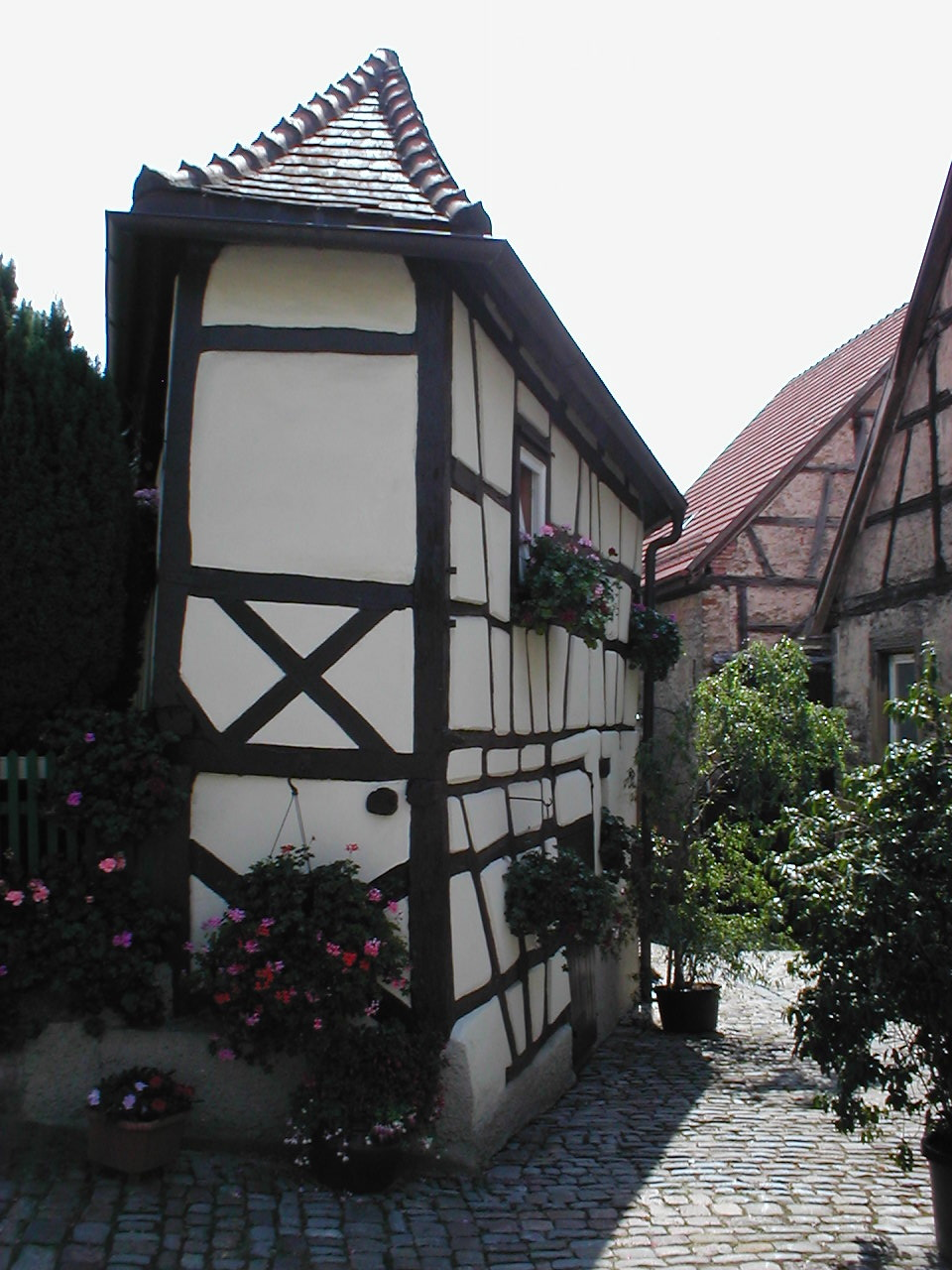
Bügeleisenhaus

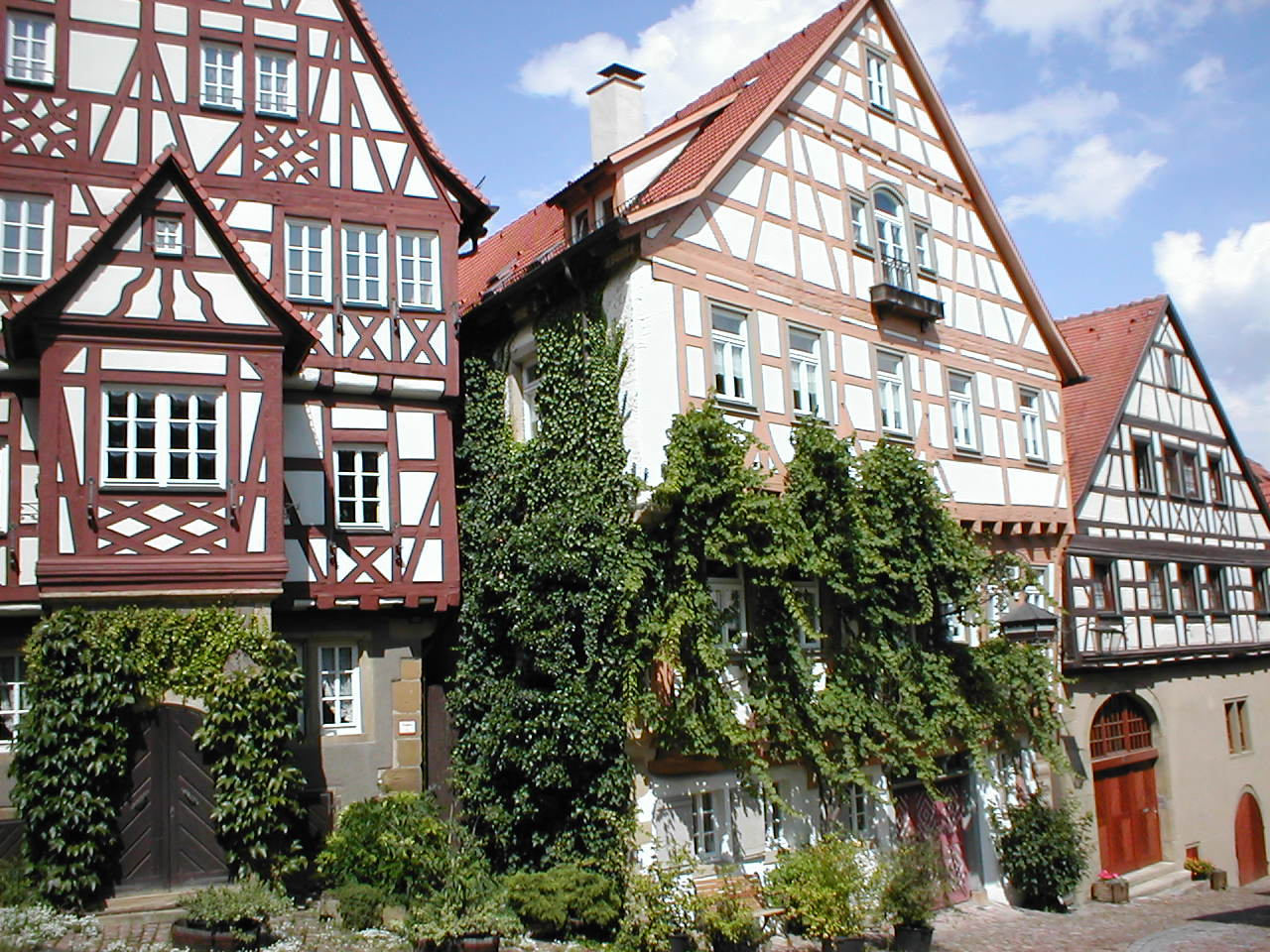
Half-timbering in the Klostergasse

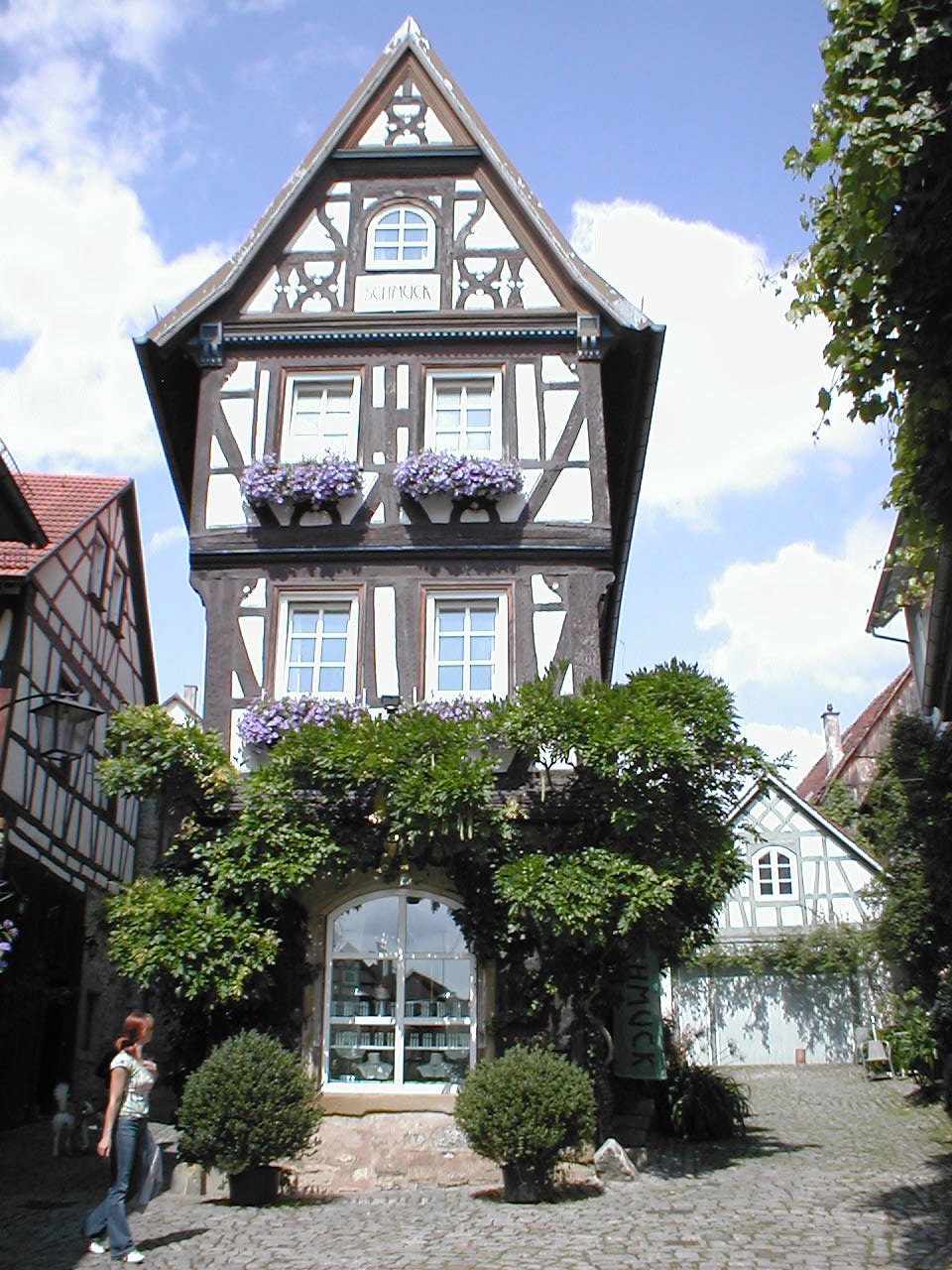
Half-timbering in the Badgasse

=== Religions ===
Aside from a Protestant and Catholic parish in Bad Wimpfen, the town also has a New Apostolic Church and some Jehovah's Witnesses. From 1947 to 2006 the buildings adjacent to the Catholic Church of St. Peter housed Grüssau Abbey. This Benedictine monastery in the district of Heilbronn, which had only three monks in 2005, was eventually closed in the autumn of 2006. Now the remaining monks live in Neuburg Abbey near Heidelberg, Sigmaringen, Kellenried Abbey and Pannonhalma Archabbey.

Formerly there also was a Jewish representation in the town. One of the earliest mentioned Jews in Wimpfen was Alexander ben Salomon, who released the remains of Rabbi Meir of Rothenburg in the early 14th century. Both are buried in Worms. Jews are known to have lived in Wimpfen in the 14th, 15th and 16th centuries. Around 1550 there was a brief expulsion of Jews. From the 17th century Jewish families lived in at least five houses in Bad Wimpfen, although several orders were passed that discriminated against them in 1598, 1630, 1756 and 1762. In 1672 there was another expulsion, cancelled two years later. Jews were given some equality in the years that Wimpfen was a free imperial city, but by 1933 only 22 Jews lived in Bad Wimpfen and they faced increasing discrimination by the Nazi party. The 1938 riots against Jews forced them to leave their homes and businesses. At least four deaths are known to have occurred during this persecution.

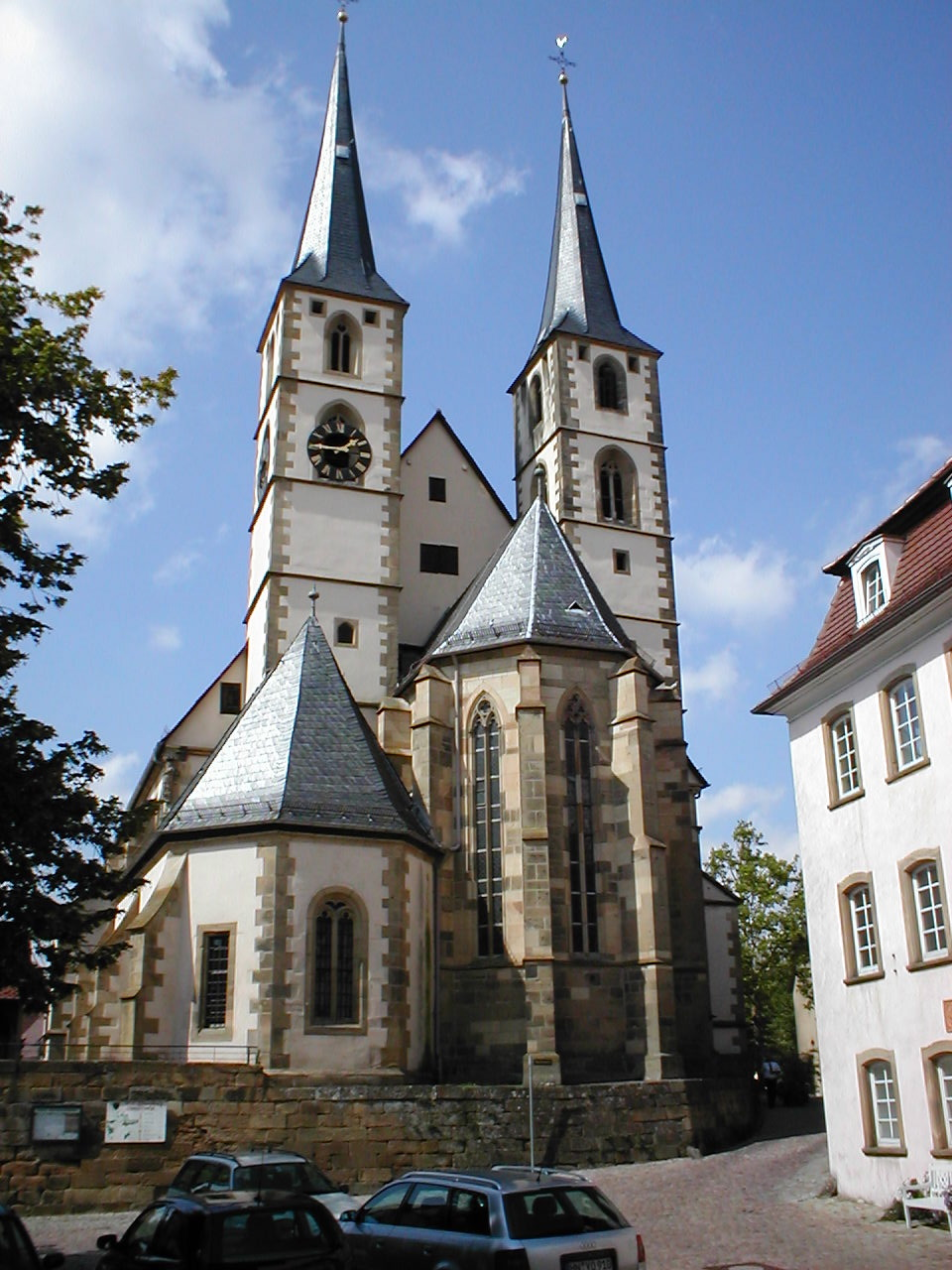
Protestant church

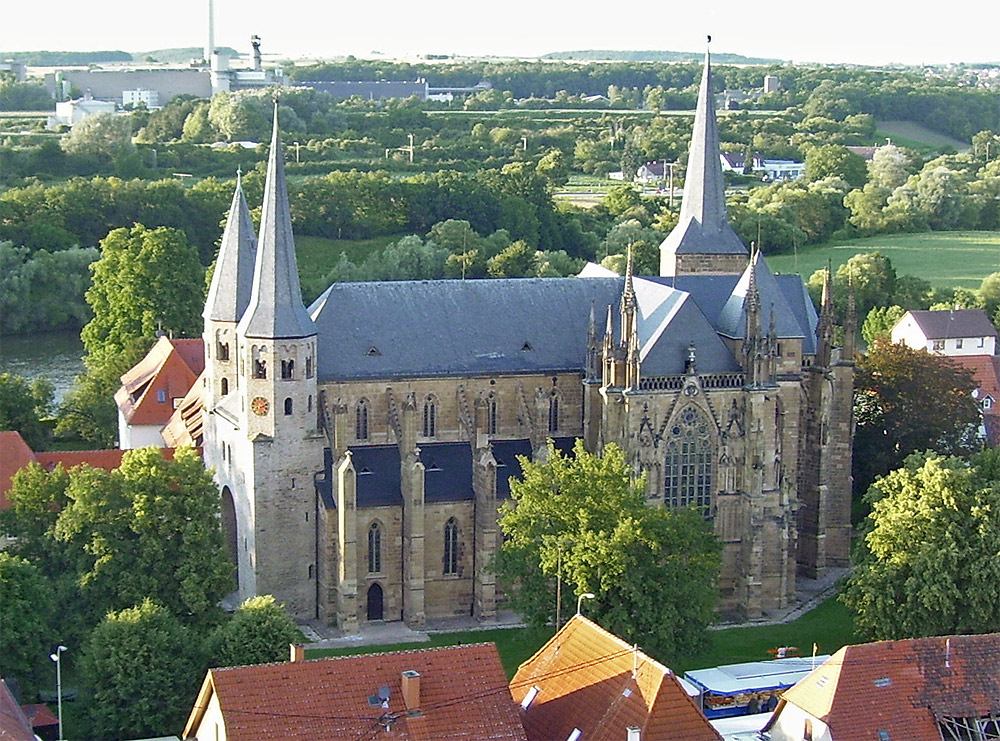
St. Peter parish church

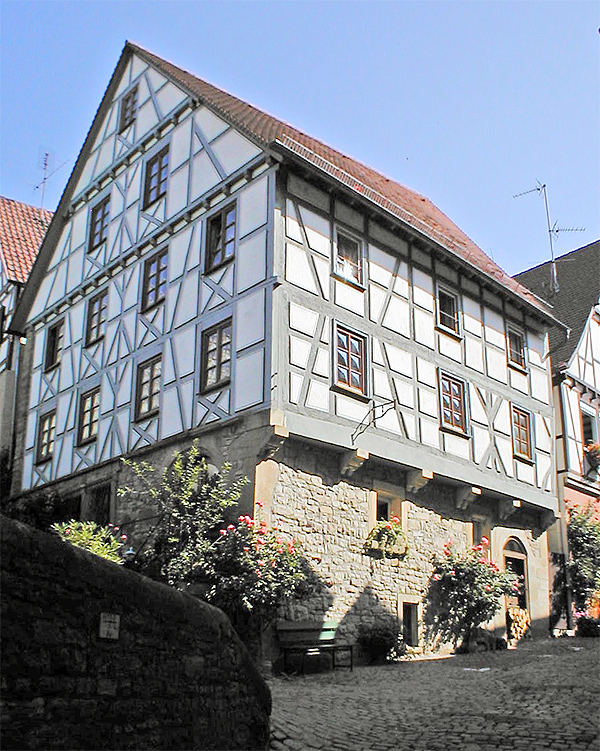
Jewish synagogue of 1580, seized in the 1930s and converted into apartments

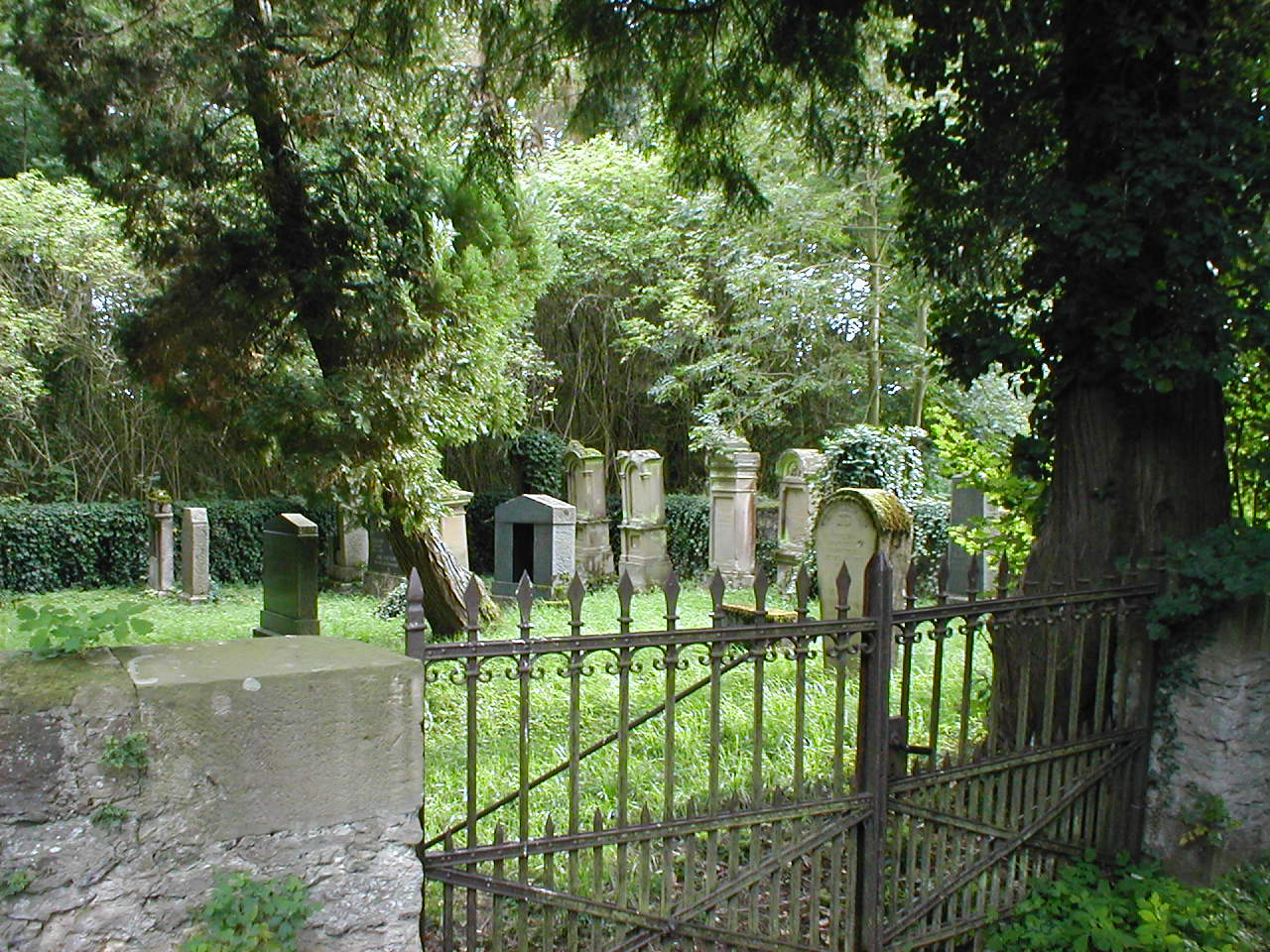
Jewish graveyard

== Politics ==
=== Local council ===
Elections in 2009 and 2014:

Party	Vote share 2014	Seats	Vote share 2009	Seats
CDU/FW	43.4%	8	38.0%	7
SPD	27.3%	5	27.0%	5
FDP/DVP/Unabhängige Bürger (UB)	14.9%	3	23.8%	4
GOL	14.4%	2	11.2%	2

The mayor is also a member of the district council and its chairman.

=== Arms and flag ===
Arms of Bad Wimpfen

Blazon: In gold the red Eagle of Empire with a horizontal silver key in its beak. The town colours are red, white and blue.

The coat of arms of Eagle and key already appear in Wimpfen's seal of 1250, used until 1436. The eagle was a former symbol of Wimpfen's dependency on the empire in the time of Staufer. Since the 14th century it was the symbol of the free imperial city. The key is both the emblem of Saint Peter and the coat of arms of the Bishopric of Worms. It indicates that the castle was built on communal land of Worms. Over the course of time the key position changed several times.

During the time of the town's Hessian membership a different coat of arms was utilised. However, this was abandoned at the time of the change of administration to Baden.

== International relations ==
Bad Wimpfen is twinned with:

- Servian in the French Département Hérault, since 1967.
- Sopron (Ödenburg) in Hungary since 1951, offering the town refuge to their many exiles after World War II.

== Culture and sights ==
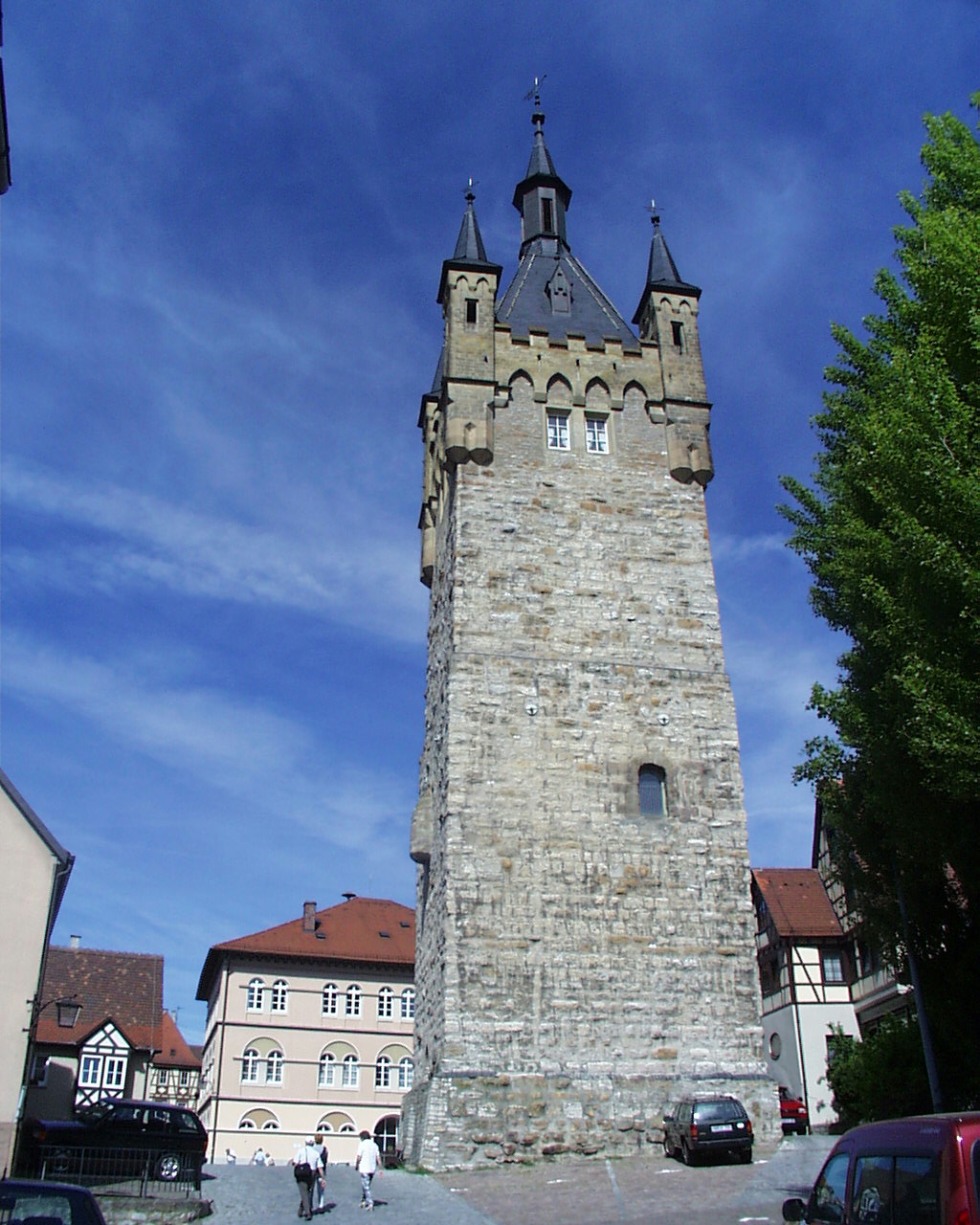
Blauer Turm

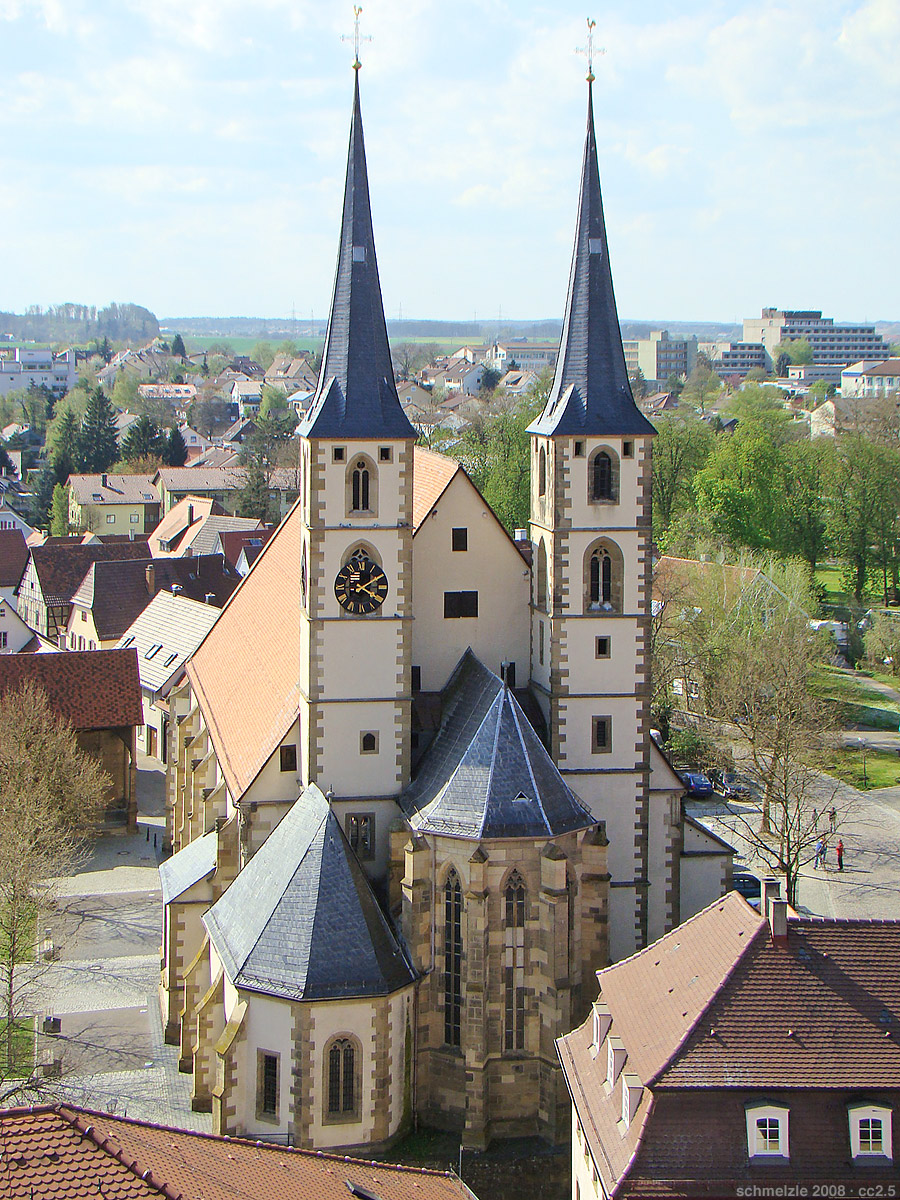
Town church

=== Notable buildings ===
==== Kaiserpfalz ====
The most important building in Bad Wimpfen is the Kaiserpfalz. Its most potent remaining symbol is the Blauer Turm (Blue Tower) of c.1170, which was occupied for 650 years. The tower is open to visitors and offers a spectacular panorama over the whole town. The Roter Turm (Red Tower) dating from c.1200 is a second tower of the Pfalz.

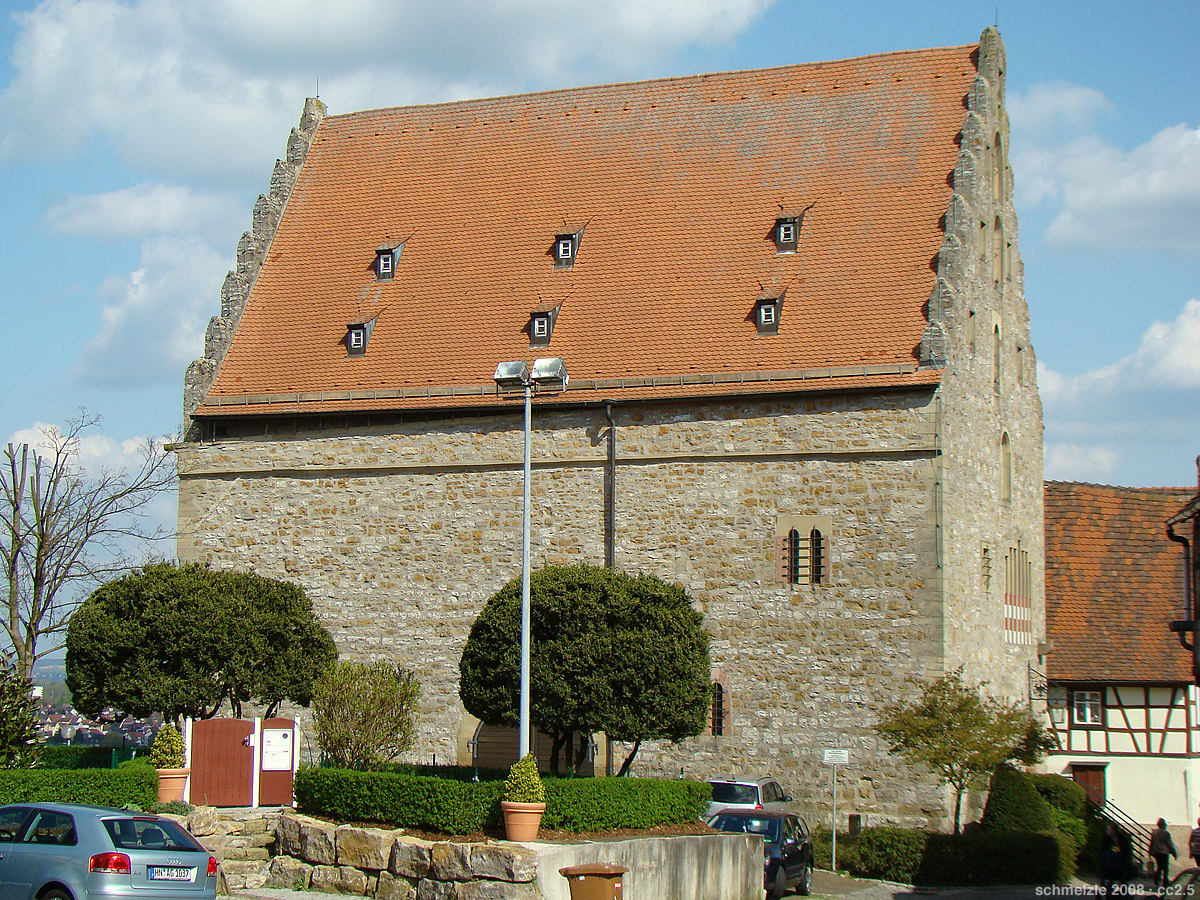
Steinhaus

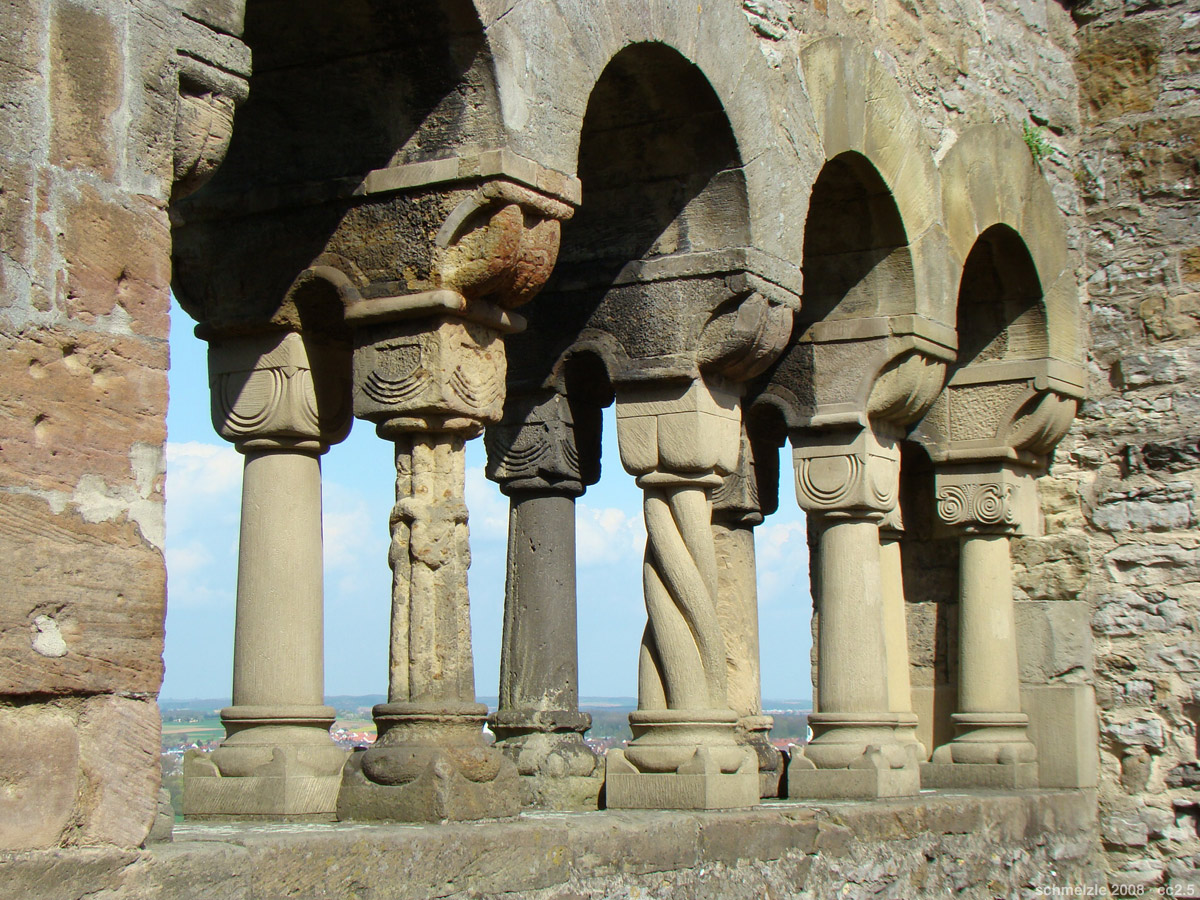
Palas-Arkadenfenster

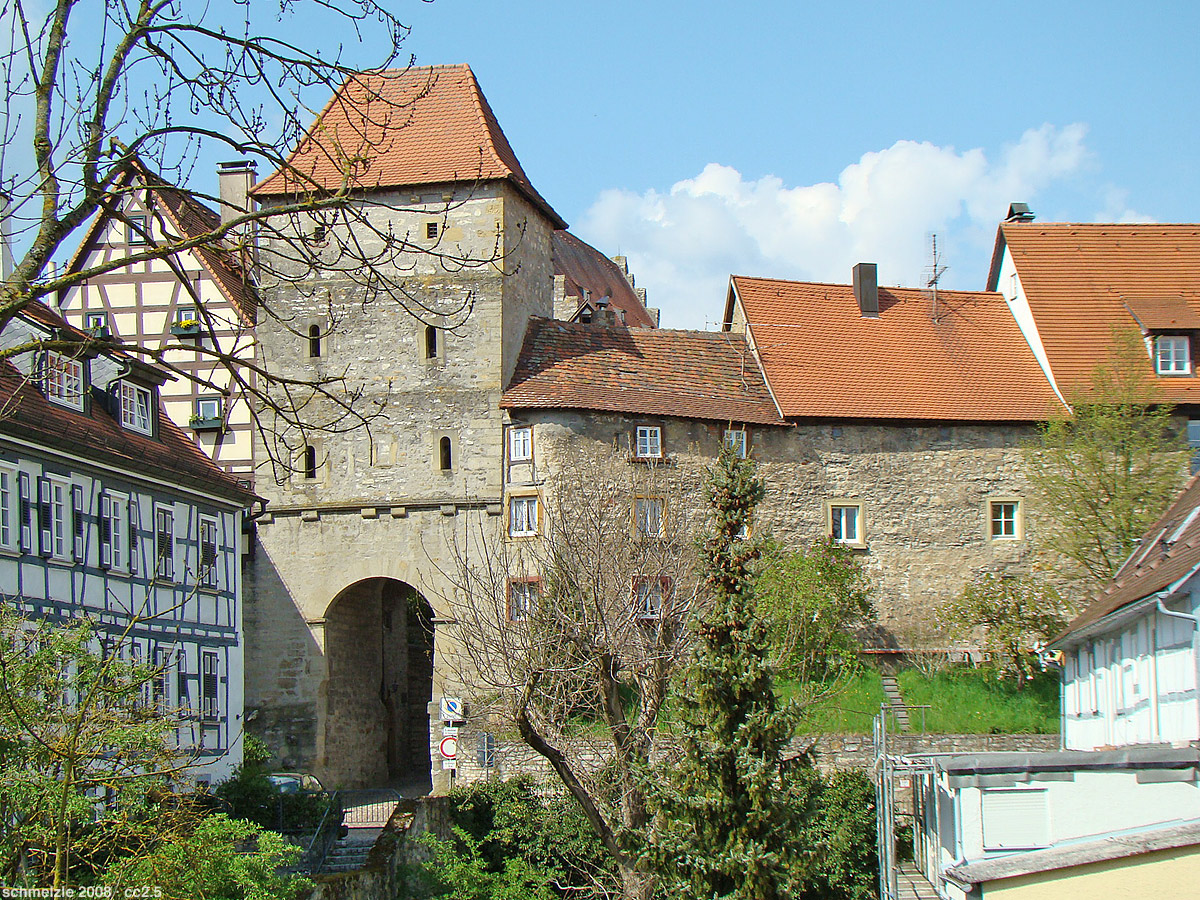
Schwibbogentor

==== Historic churches ====
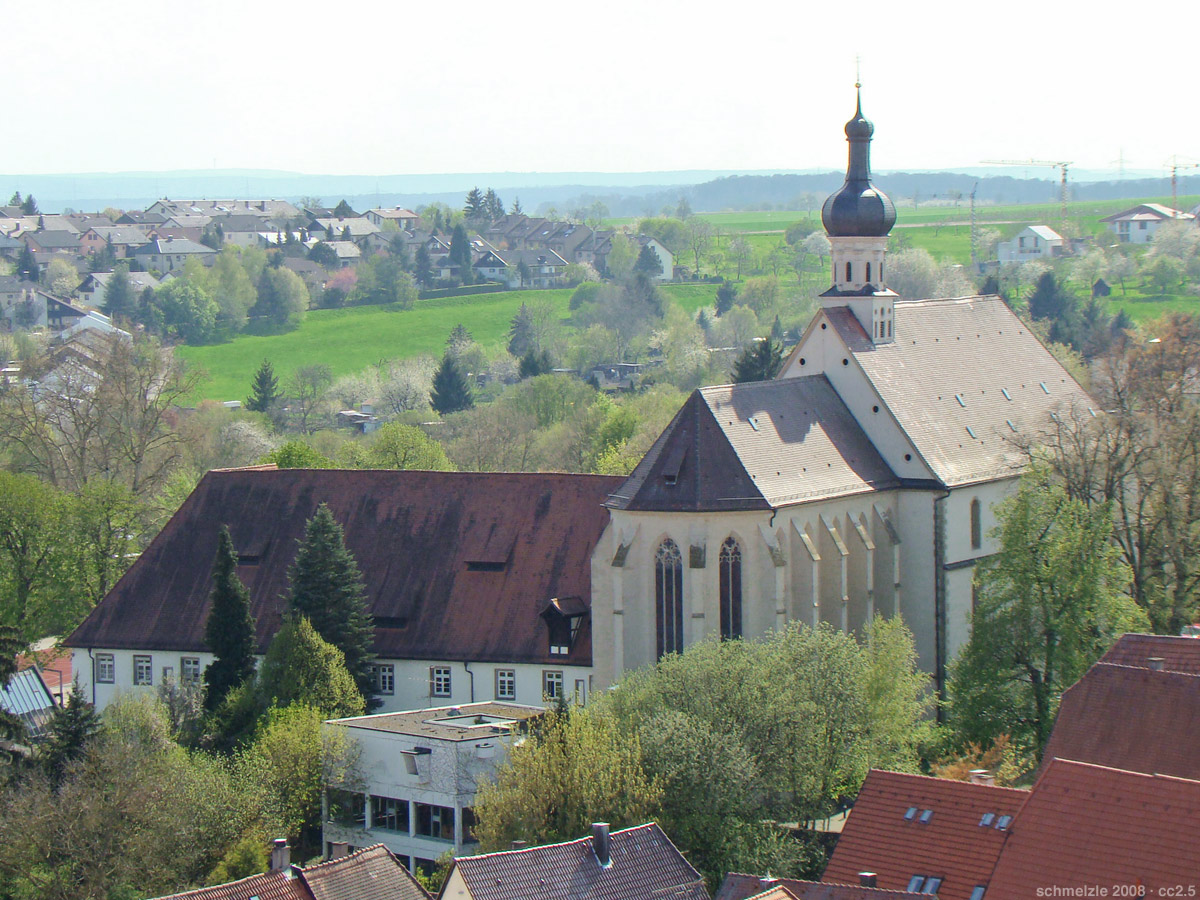
Dominican church with former monastery

The Protestant Stadtkirche was built in the 13th century, initially in the style of Romanesque architecture but finishing with Gothic architecture. Next to the church is a calvary shrine.

The construction of the Dominikanerkirche presumably started in the 13th and ended in the 18th century. The former monastery with artistic cloister houses a school today. The church is used as the Catholic parish church.

The former Johanneskirche was built in the 15th century and rebuilt in 1778. It was secularized in 1803. As a result of a fire in 1851 the church lost its function, and since then the building served as a restaurant.

In the castle quarter on Schwibbogengasse lies the former Jewish synagogue of 1580. This was seized in the 1930s and converted into flats.

The diocesan church St. Peter in Wimpfen im Tal, under the control of Grüssau Abbey from 1947 to 2004, is thought to go back to the 7th century. Today's church with its bordering cloister was built in the 13th and 14th century. There was a comprehensive renovation in 2006.

The Cornelienkirche lies east of the centre of Wimpfen im Tal. The building was built in 1476 in the Gothic style, and has a splendid portal with wall murals. It is believed that Tilly camped here during the Battle of Wimpfen.

Nearby, the village of Hohenstadt contains an old Protestant parish church.

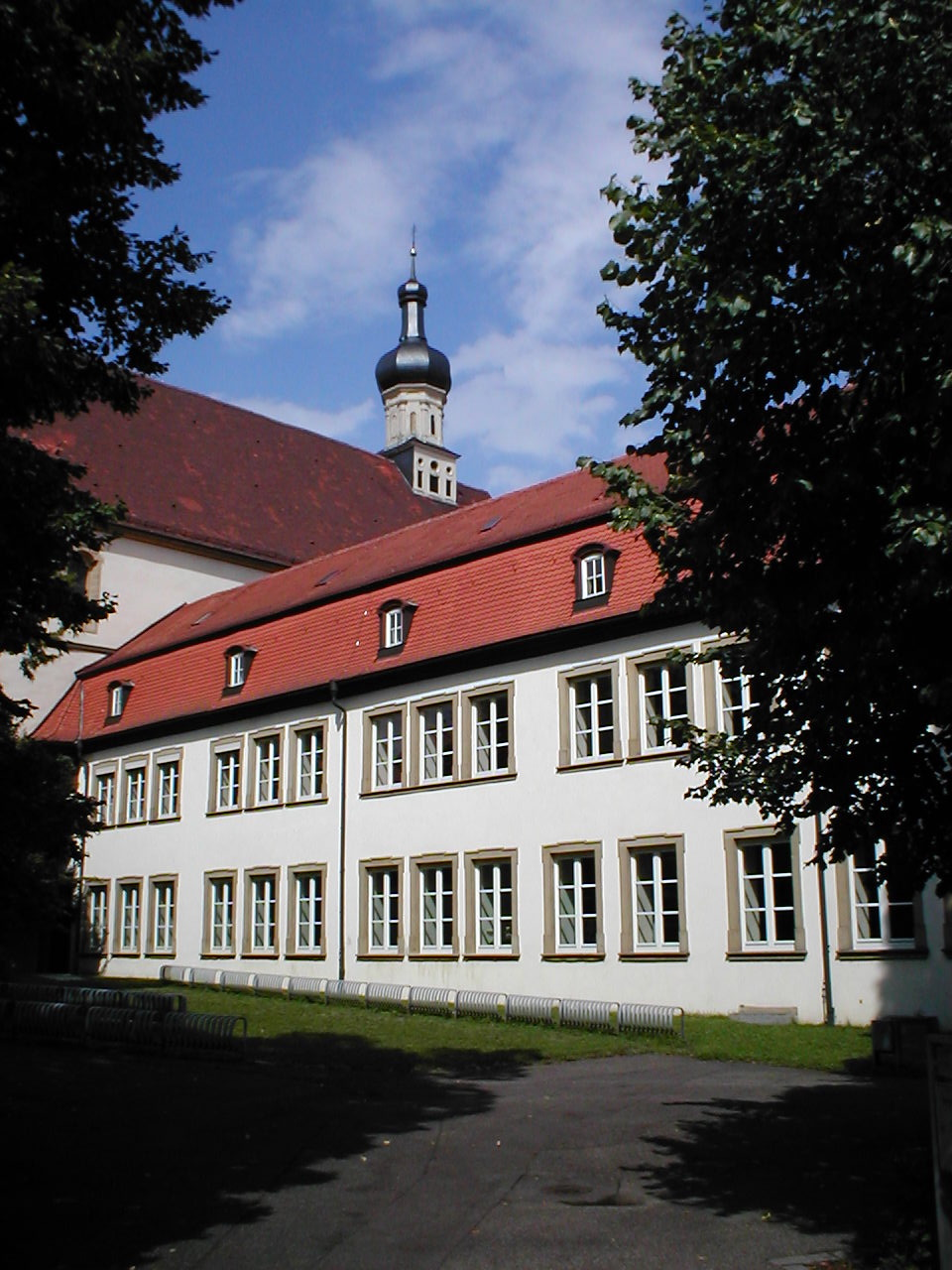
Former Dominican monastery, now a school

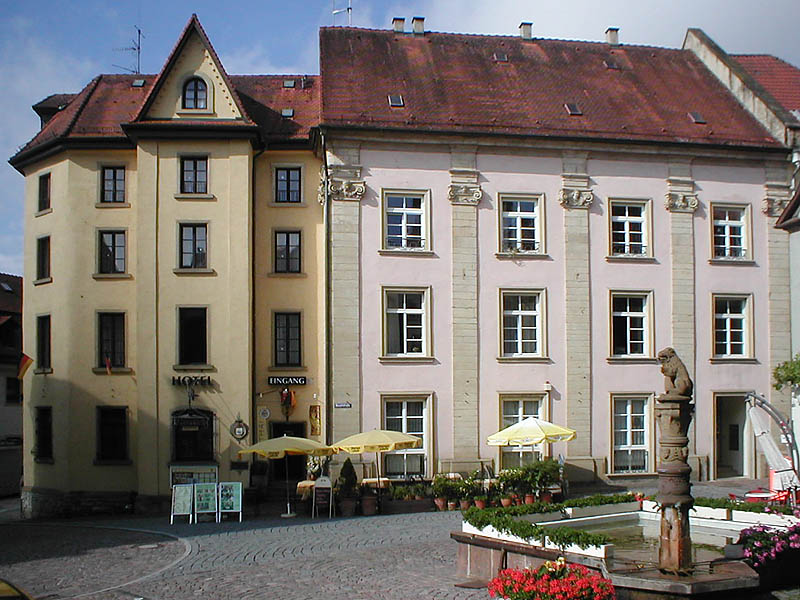
Former hospital, now a residential building

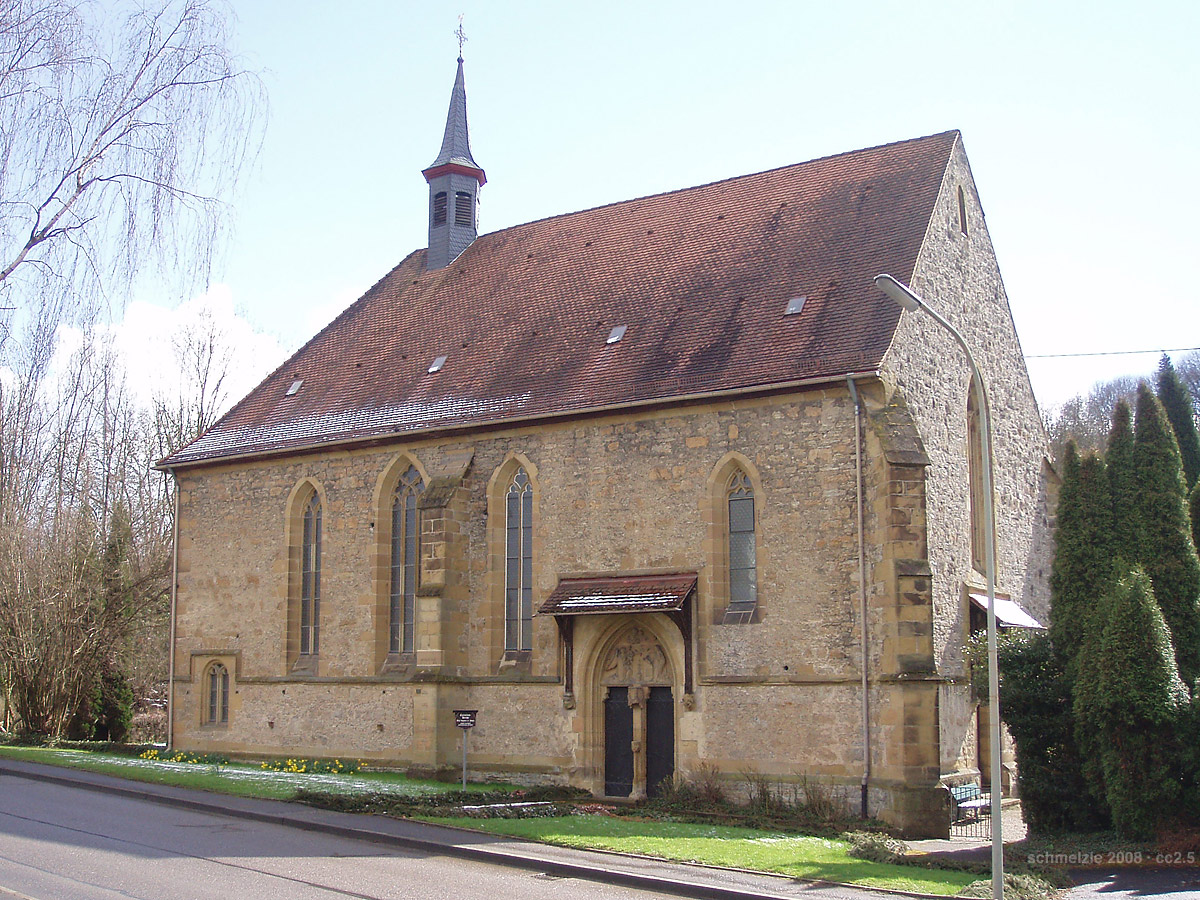
Cornelienkirche

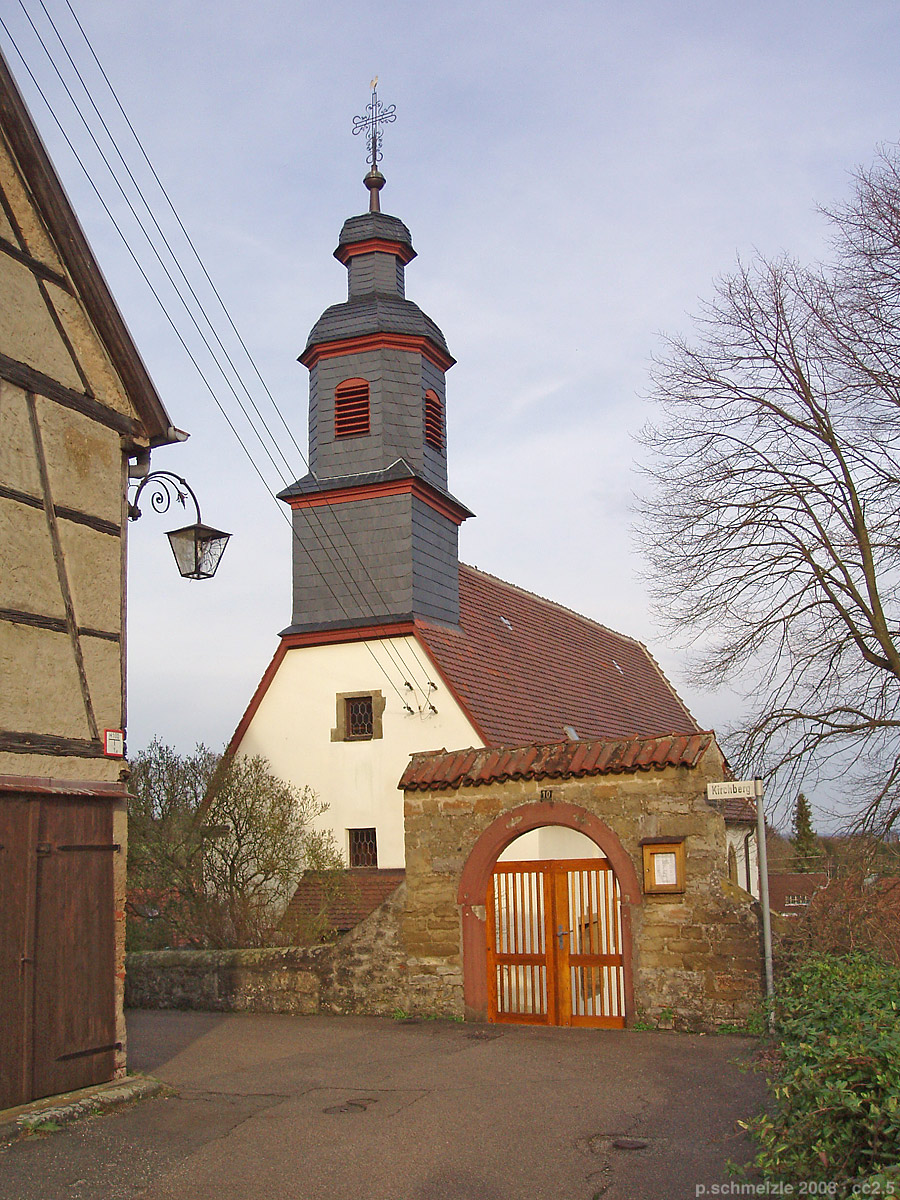
Protestant parish church in Hohenstadt

==== Secular monuments ====
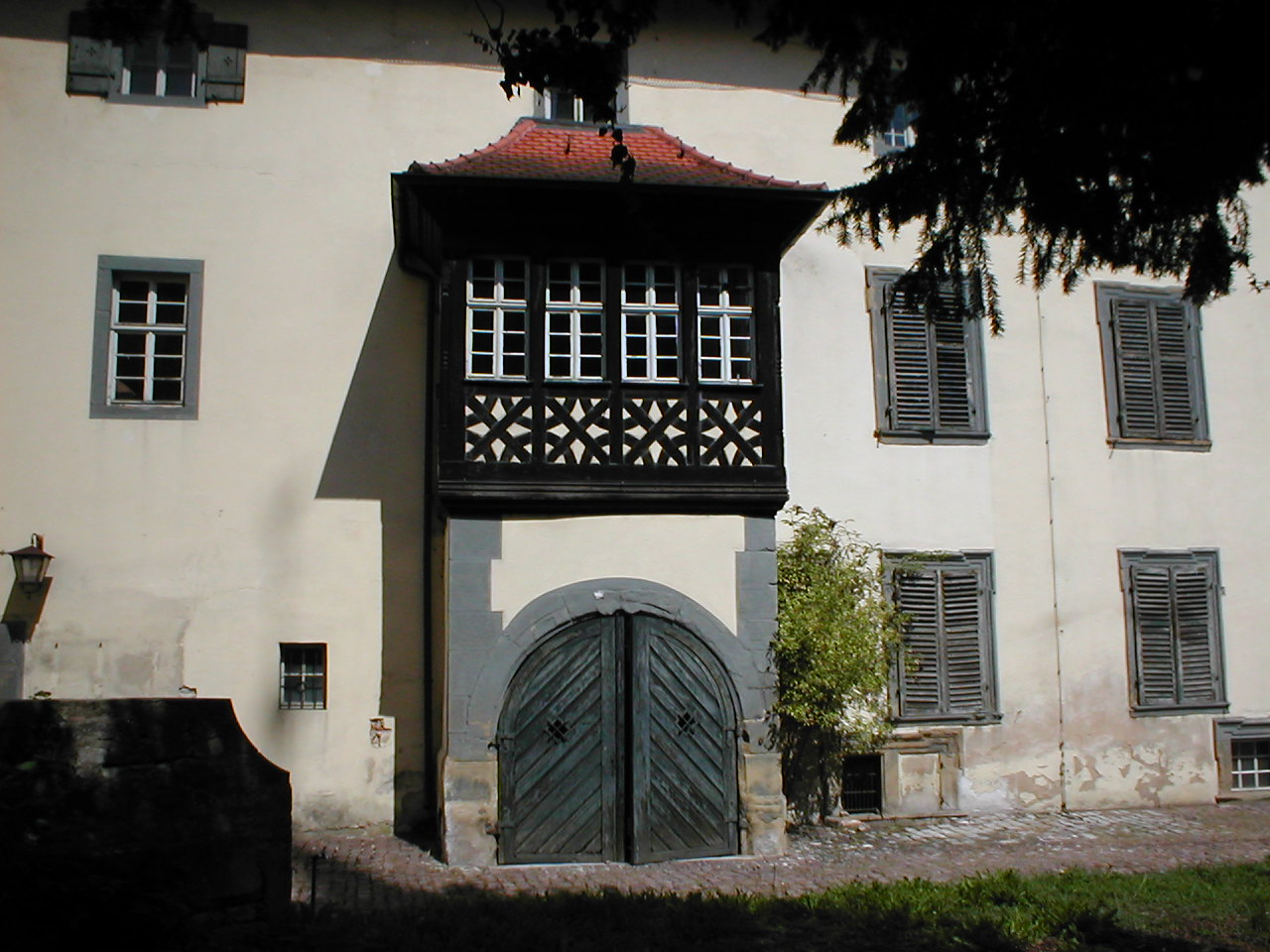
Wormser Hof, portal of 1566

- The Bürgerspital (donated around 1230) is one of the oldest half-timbered buildings of the town. Since 1992 it contains the imperial town's museum.
- The Wormser Hof is situated next to the Kaiserpfalz nearby the town hall. The bordering wall behind represents a part of the city wall.
- The Bürgermeister-Elsässer-Haus was built in the shadow of the Blauer Turm in the 16th century
- The Nürnberger Türmchen next to the Red Tower was erected in gratitude from the city of Nuremberg for its help in the reconstruction of the heavily damaged city walls after the Thirty Years' War.
- Inside the whole old part of the town there are many half-timbered buildings of the 16th century.
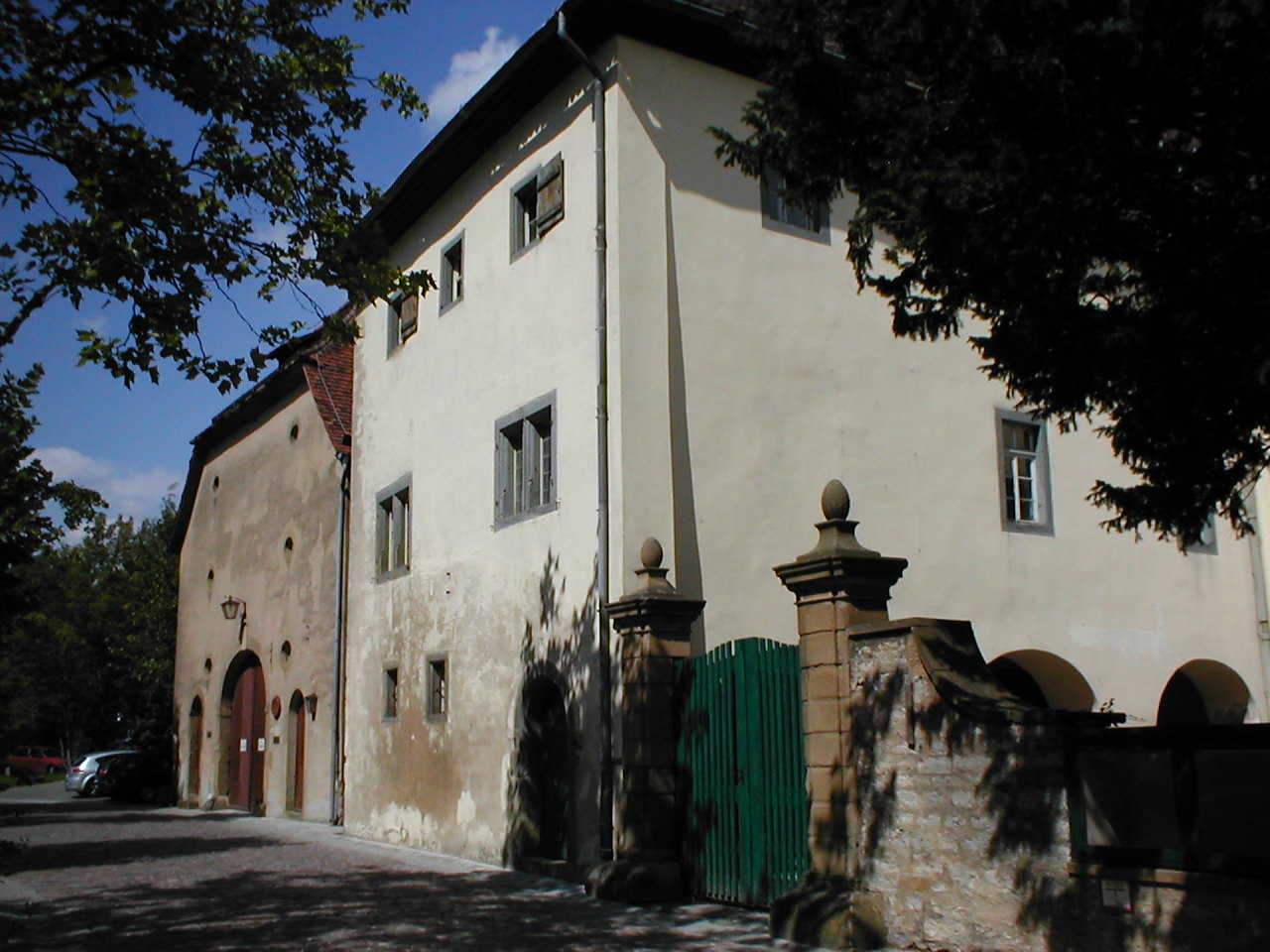
Wormser Hof

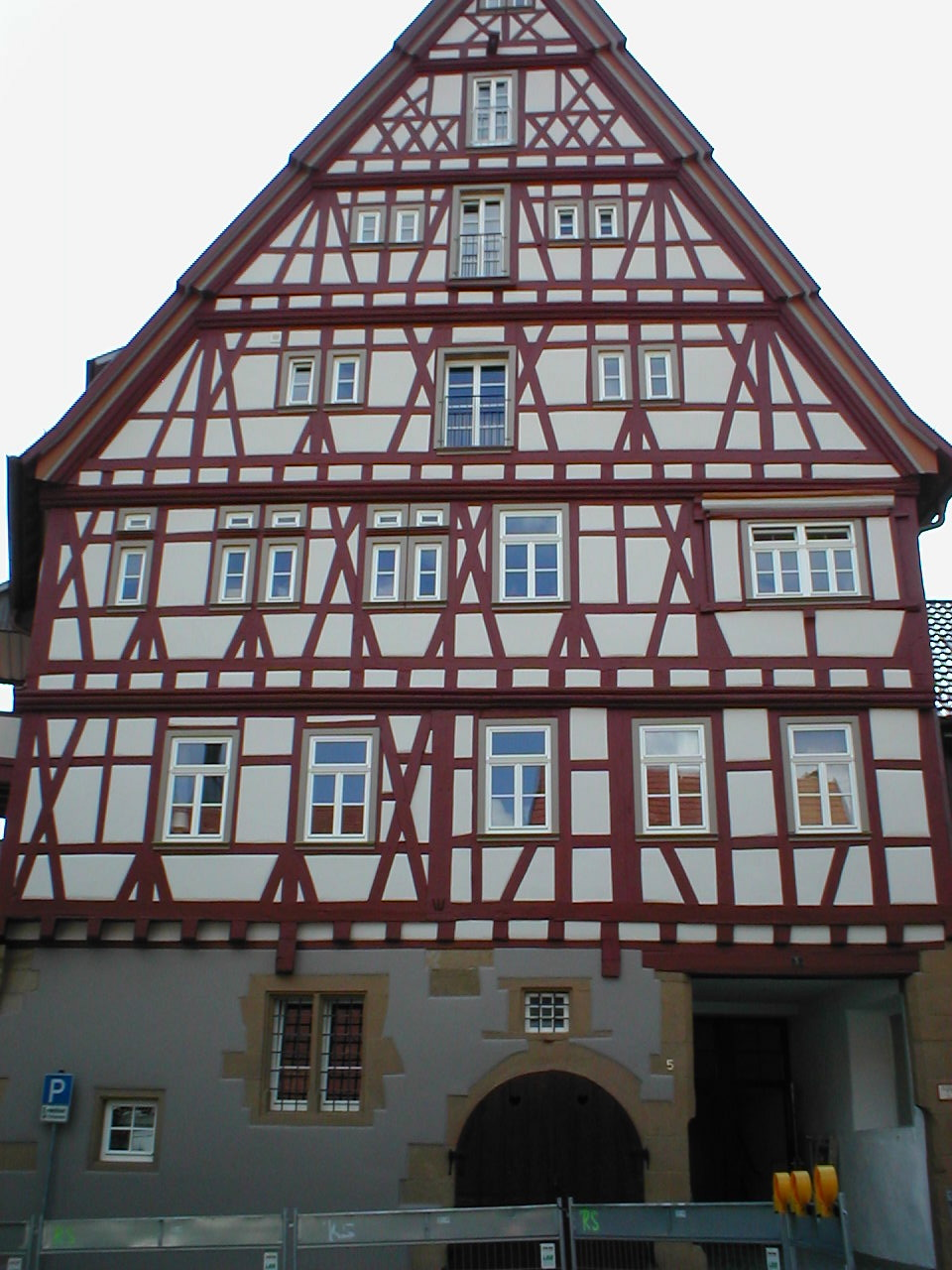
Riesenhaus, 1532

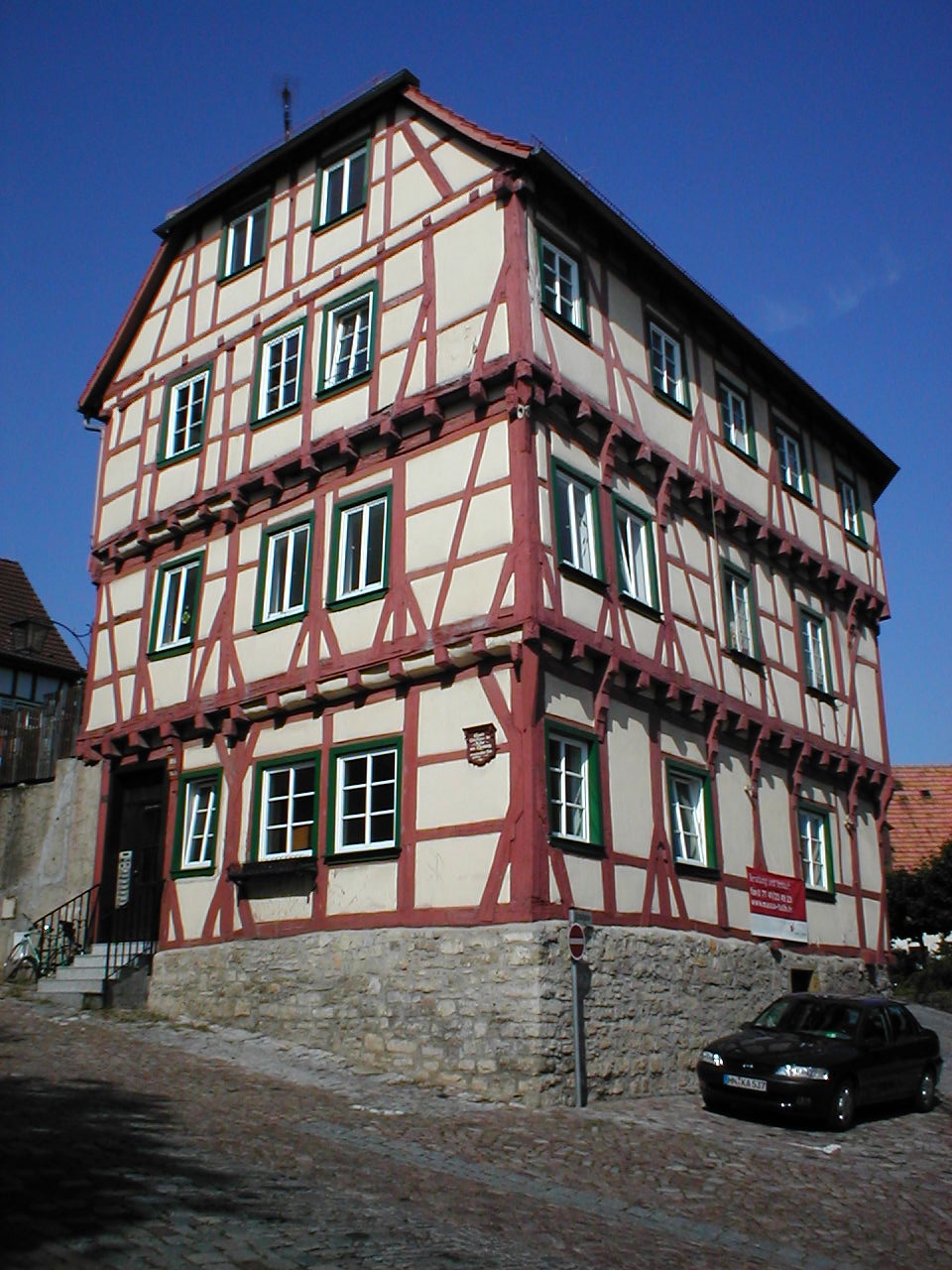
residential building, 1451

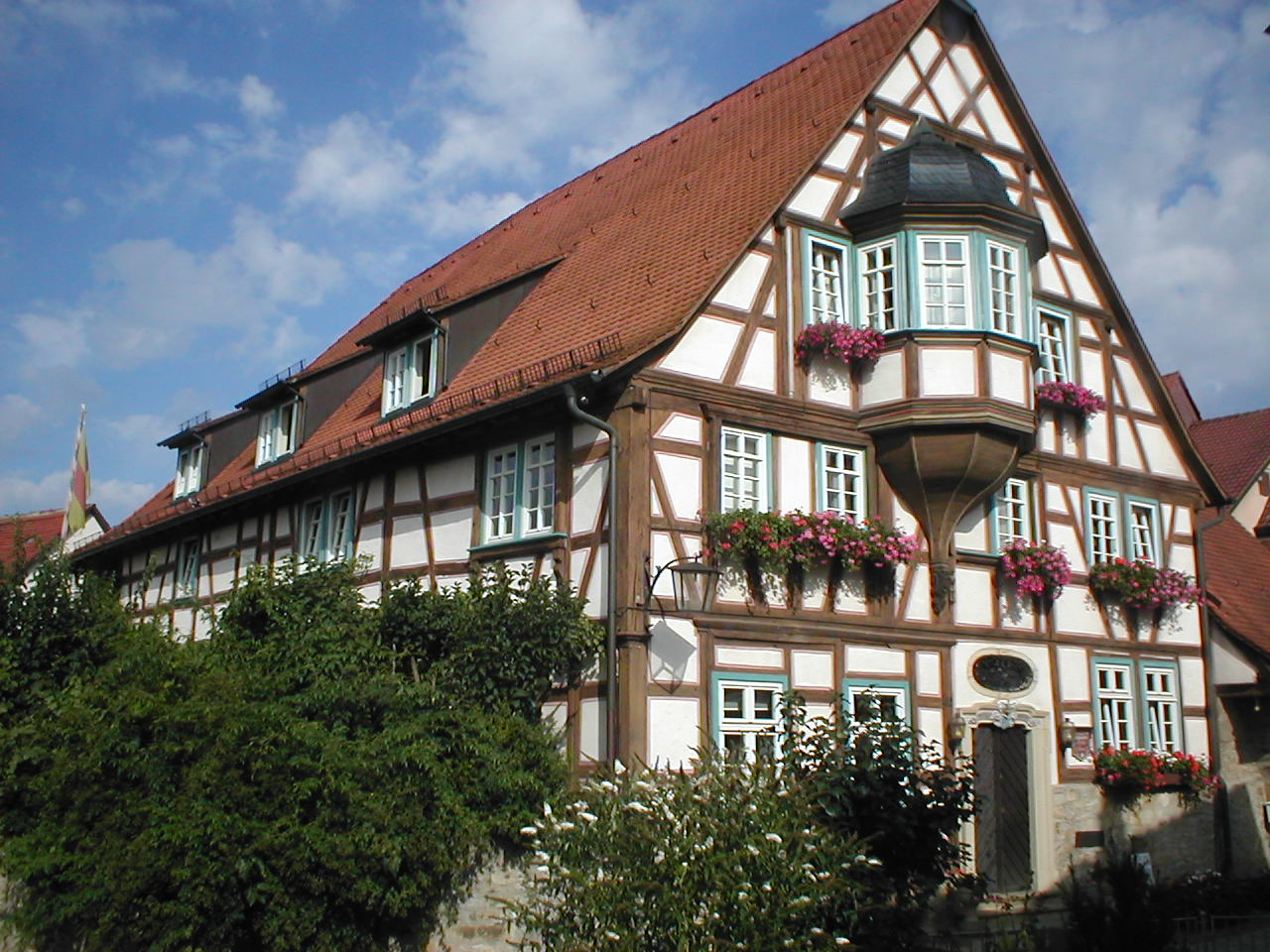
Bgm-Elsässer-Haus, 16th c., bay window of 1717

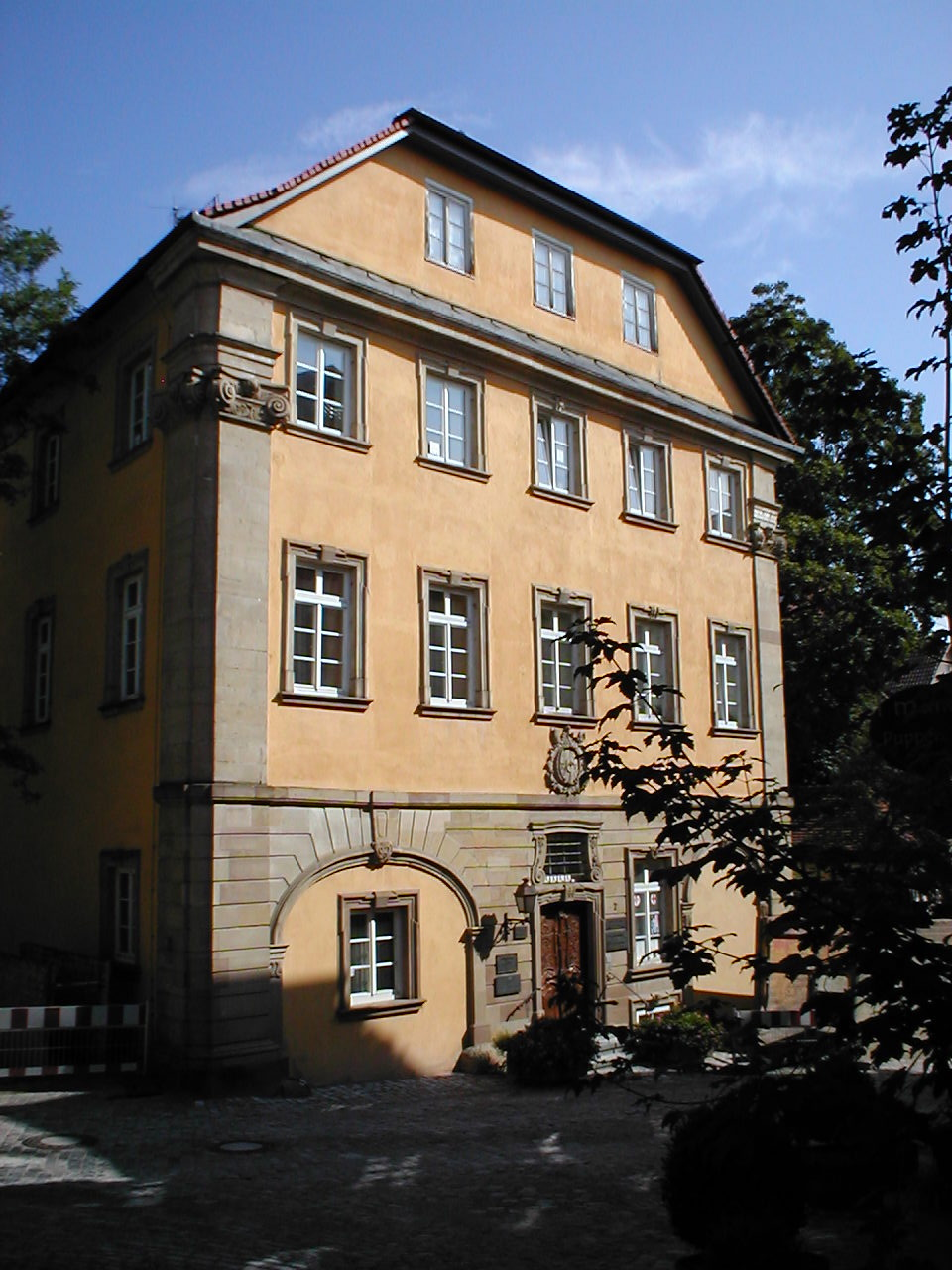
Konventshaus, 1765

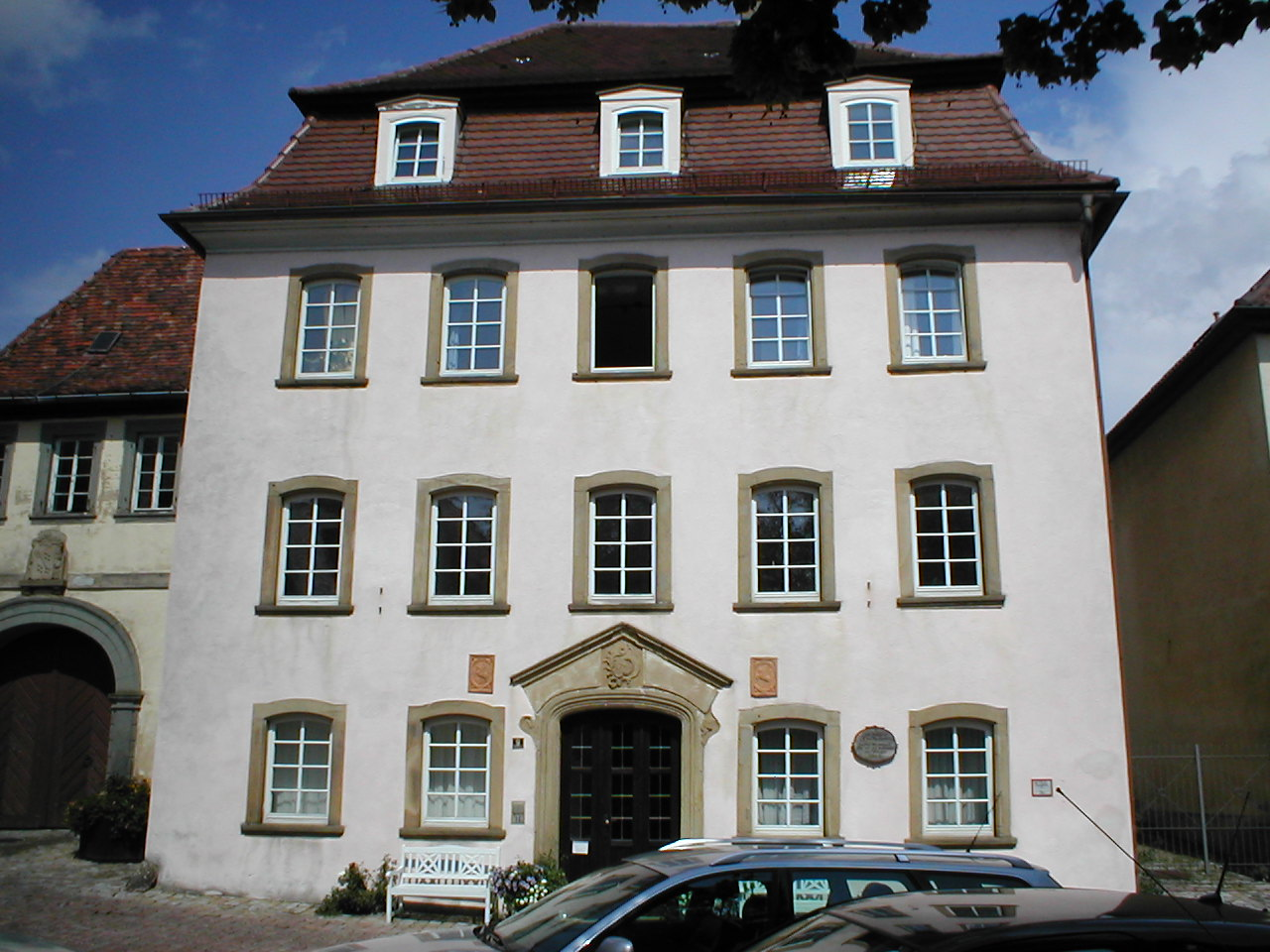
Inn Rappen (Black Stallion)

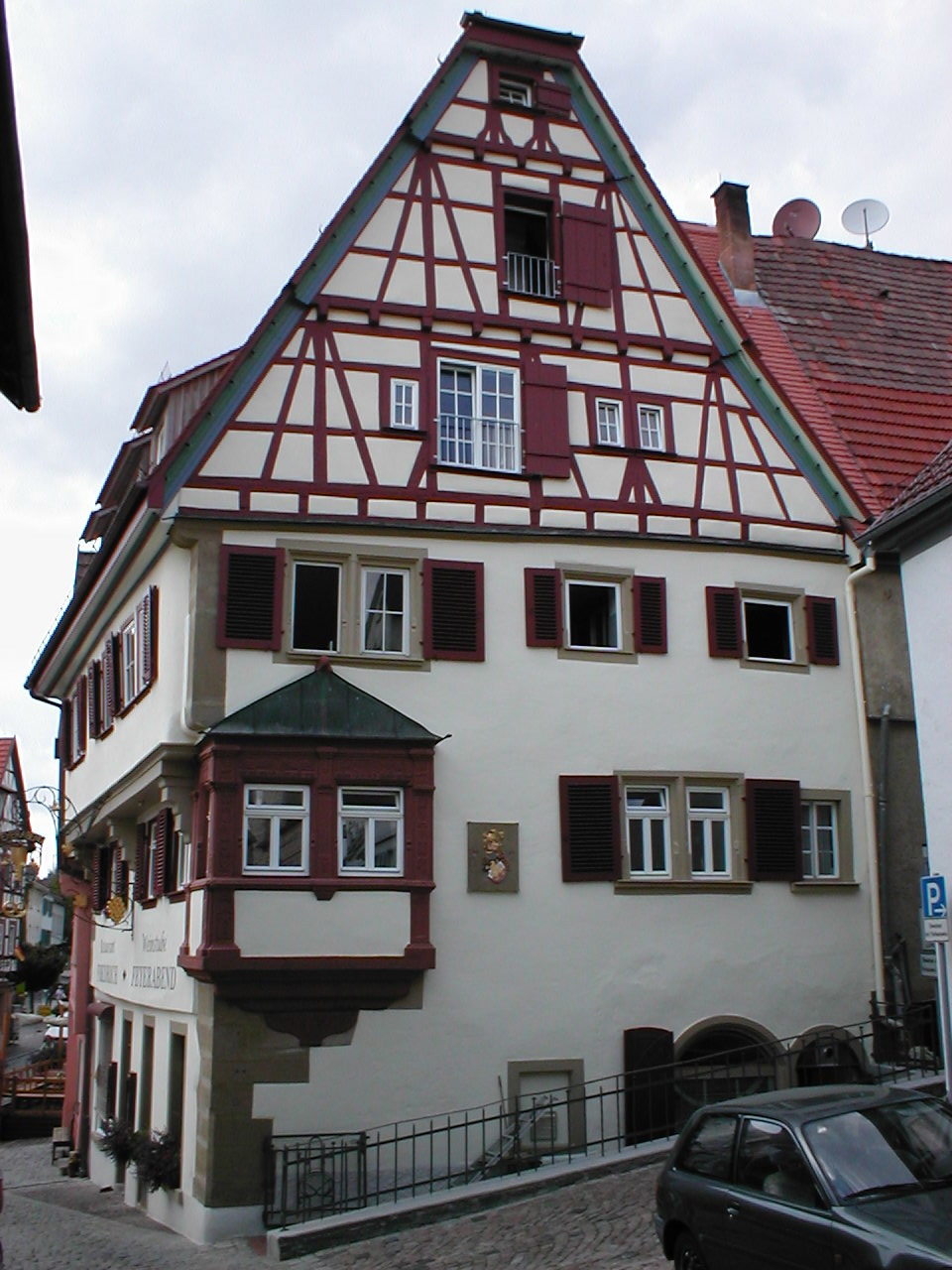
Haus Feyerabend, 1563

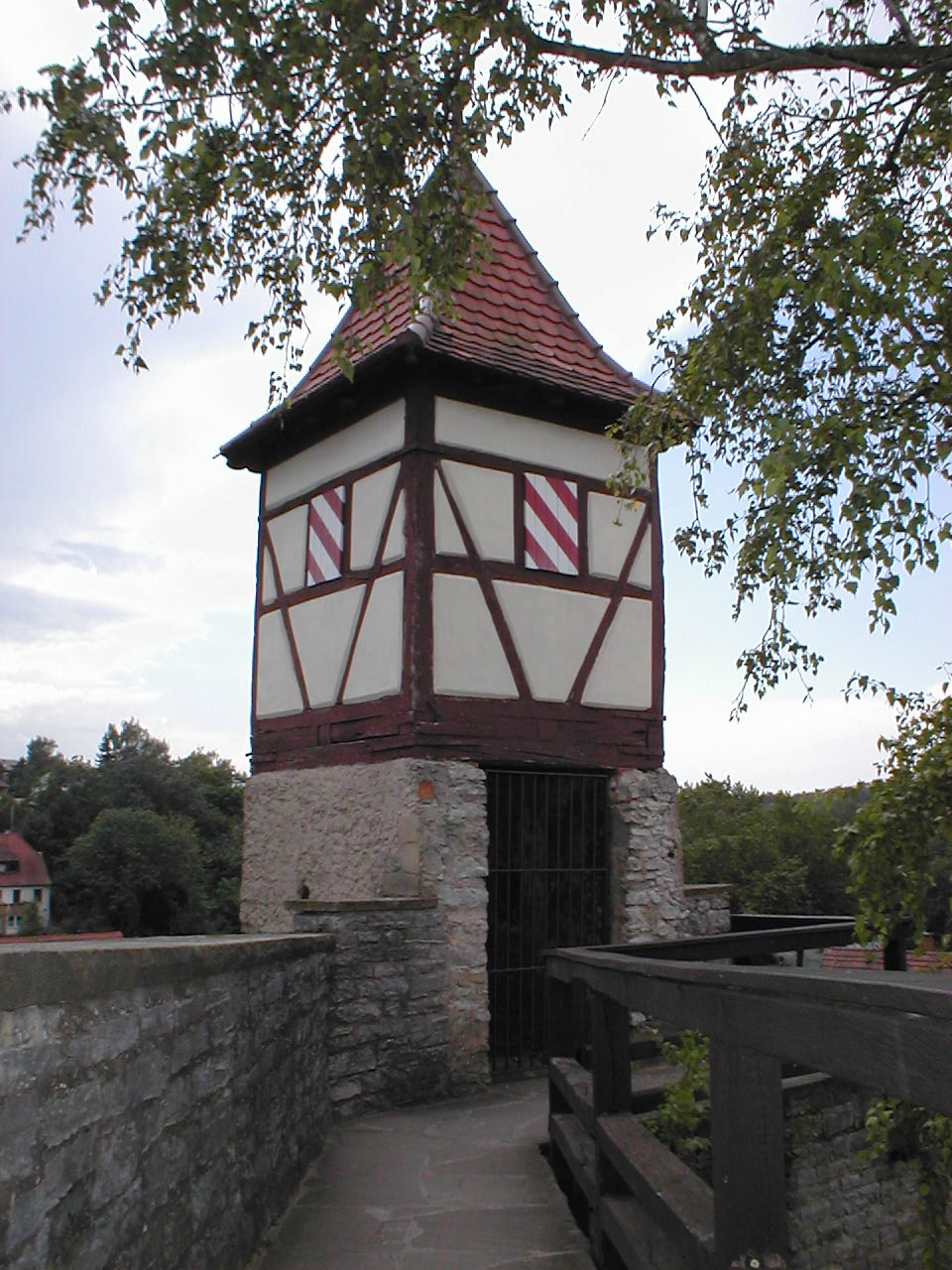
Nürnberger Türmchen, 17th century

==== Fountains/wells ====
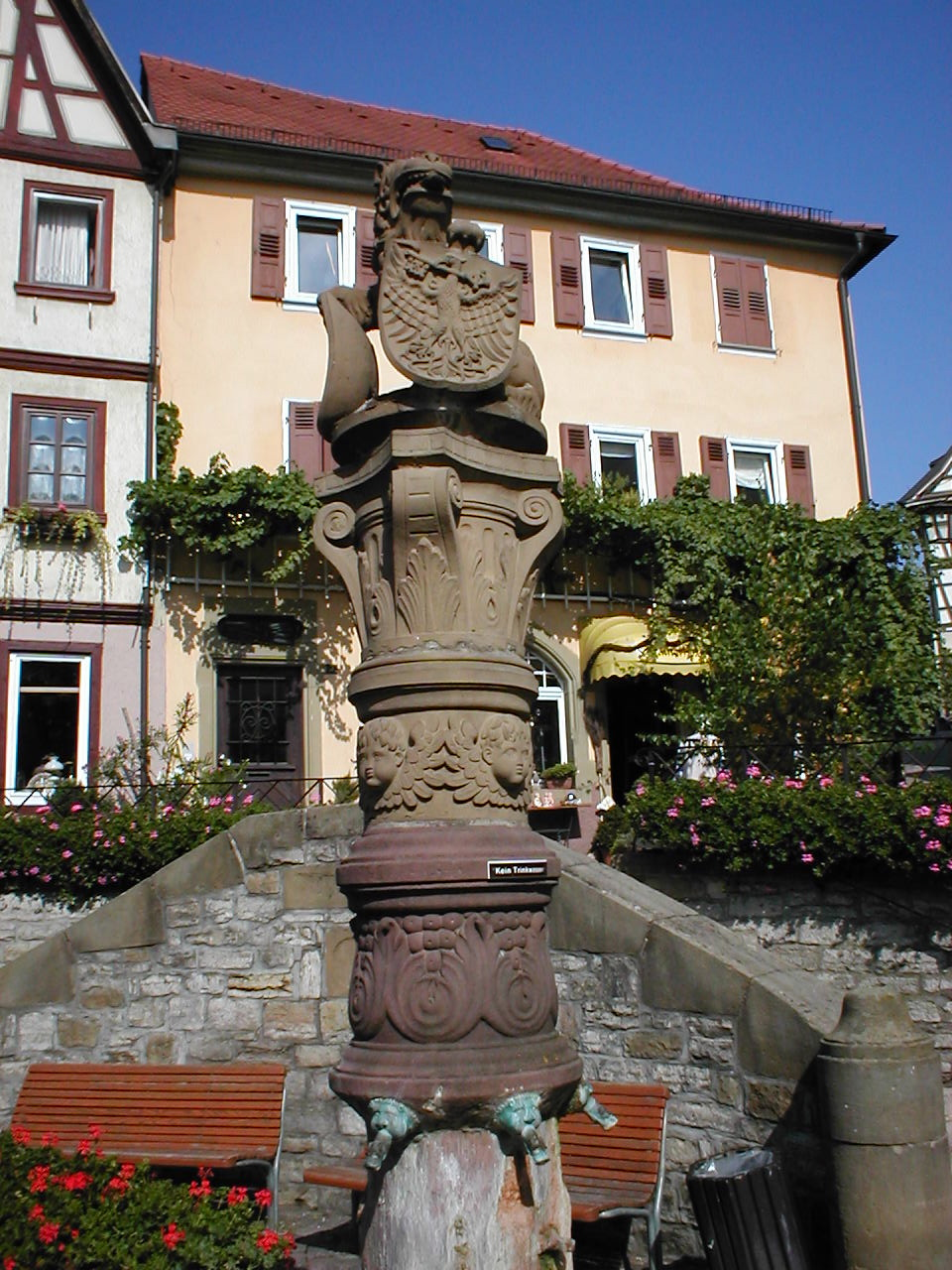
Löwenbrunnen

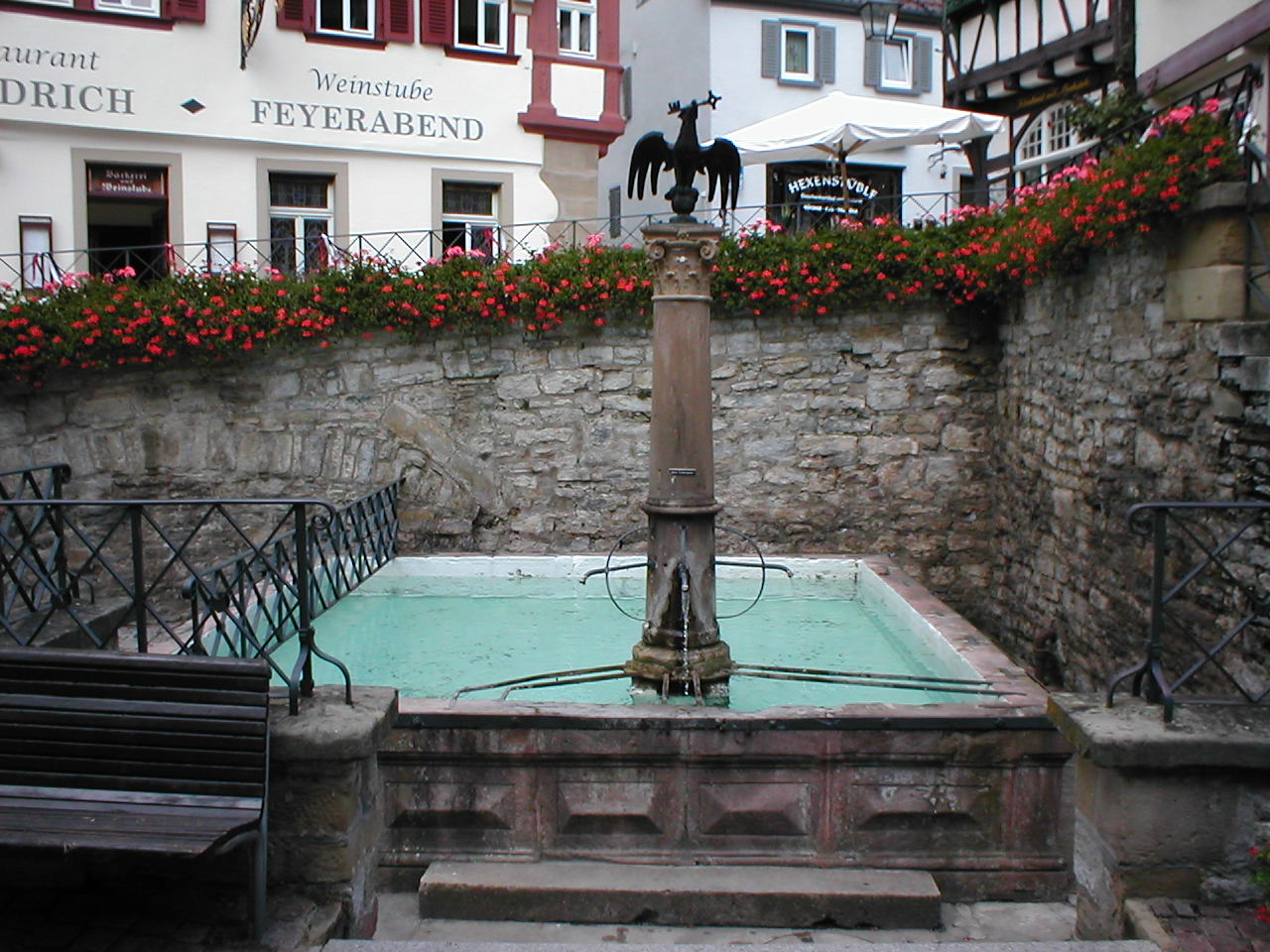
Adlerbrunnen

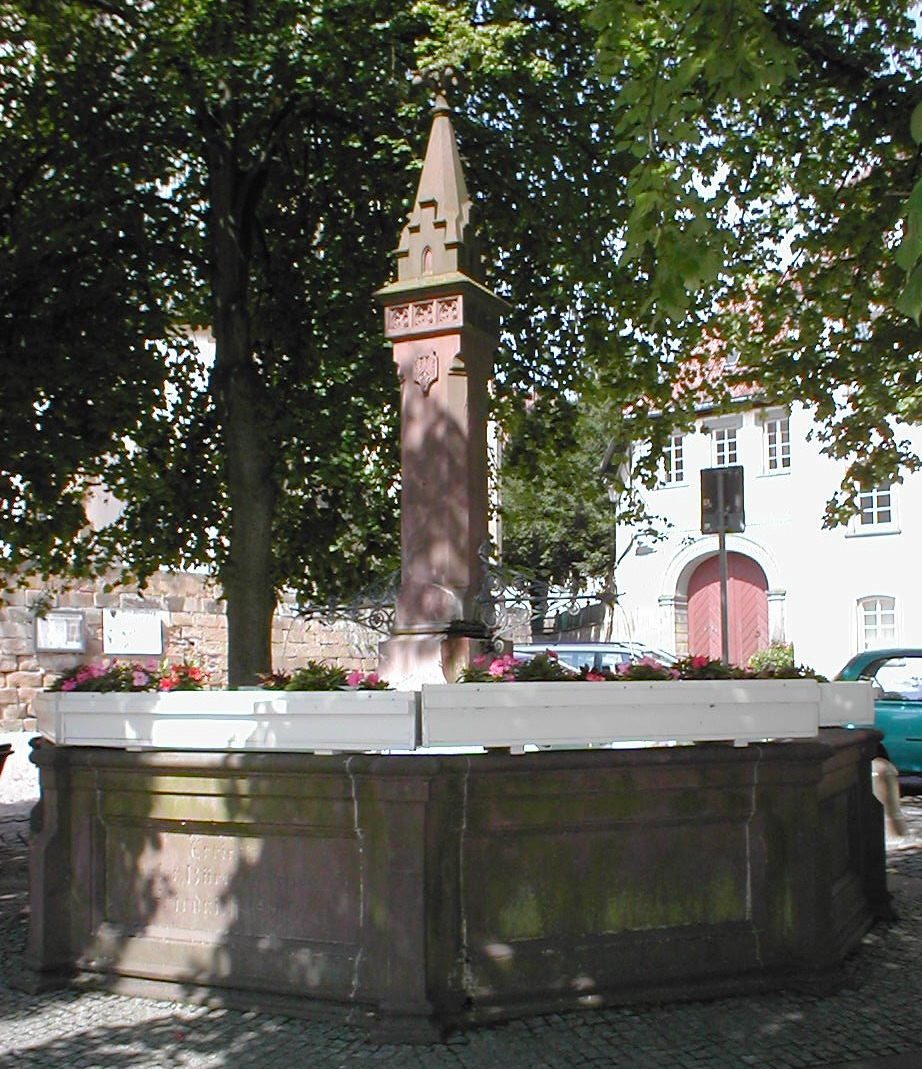
Marktbrunnen

=== Museums ===
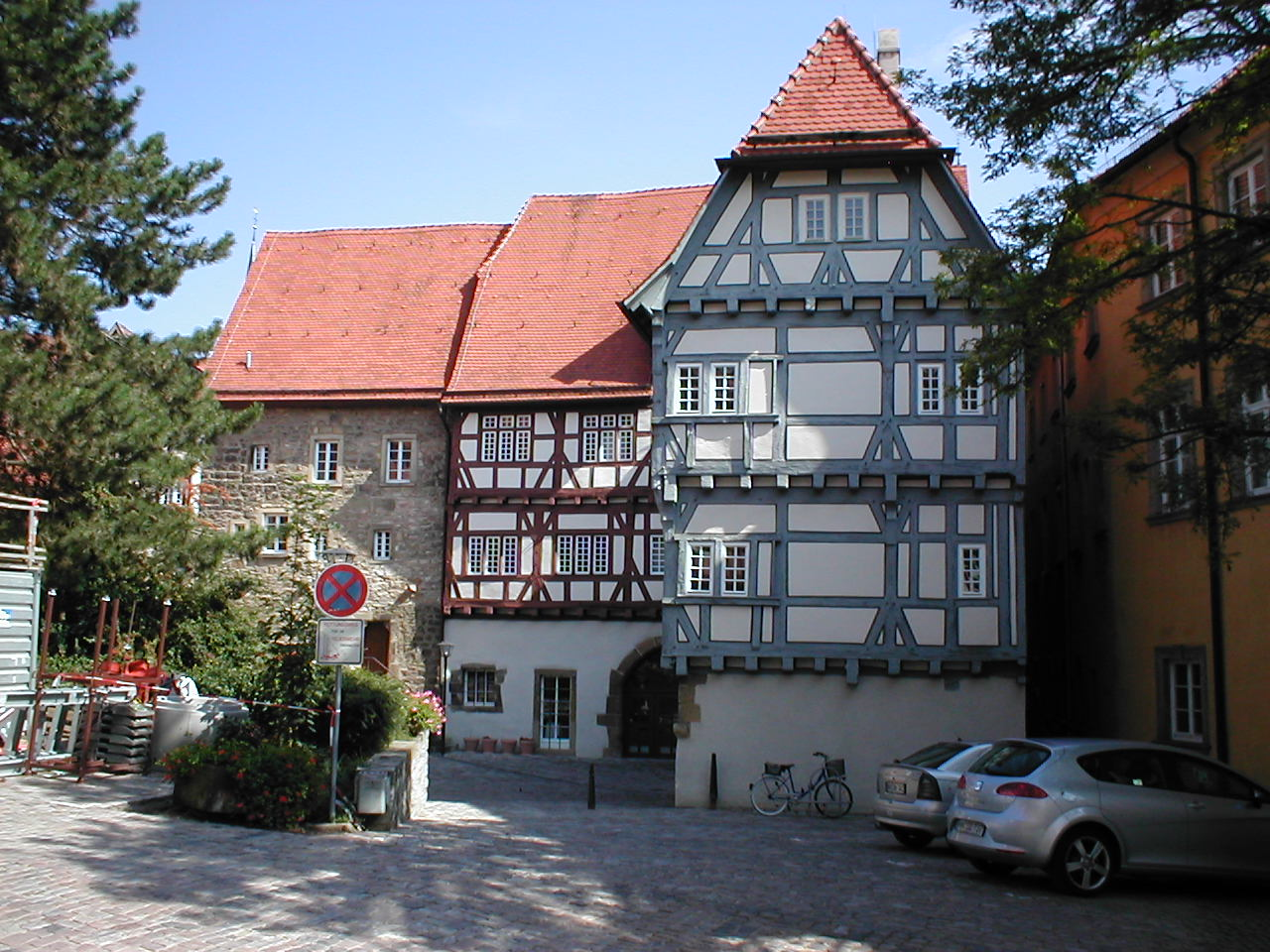
Bürgerspital with museum

There are several museums inside the historical old part of the town.

- Museum of Ecclesiastical History, within the Staufen Imperial Palace Chapel (c.1200).
- Museum of History, within the Steinhaus.
- Imperial Town Museum, within the former civic hospital on Langgasse.
- The Odenburg Local Environment Museum set between Langgasse and Hauptstrasse.

=== Theatre ===
Since 2003 the Wimpfen open-air shows open-air plays in front of the historical old scenery of the town.

=== Sports and leisure ===
In Wimpfen there's a brine bath and an open-air pool. The most successful sports club is the row club of the town.

=== Regular events ===
The Talmarkt has taken place since 965. Additionally Bad Wimpfen is also known for its historic Christmas market, which takes place in the town’s medieval old town.

== Economy and infrastructure ==
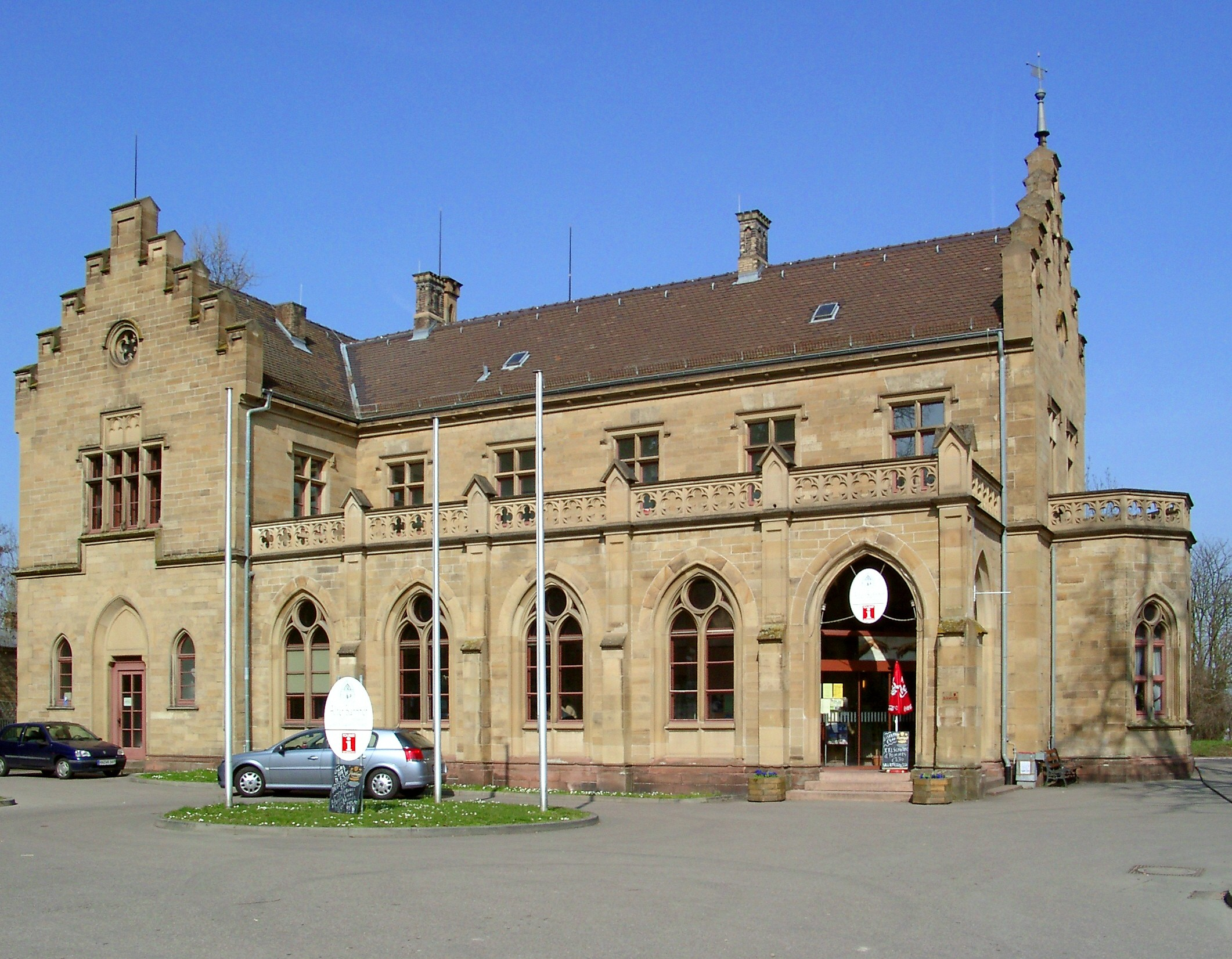
Bad Wimpfen station

One of the biggest employers in Bad Wimpfen is Solvay Fluor GmbH containing more than 350 employees and producing different products in fluorine chemistry, e. g. refrigerants and propellants. The biggest employer is “Lidl AG”, which is the main office of one of the biggest supermarket chains in Germany and Europe. They have about 2000 employees. Many inhabitants are working at the AUDI AG in Neckarsulm.

=== Transport ===
Bad Wimpfen station is on the Elsenz Valley Railway (Elsenztalbahn) running from Heilbronn to Heidelberg. The station, dating from 1868 is a rare Neo-Gothic style, which many consider to appear Scottish in influence. It contains an apartment and a cocktail bar . Bad Wimpfen Im Tal and Bad Wimpfen-Hohenstadt halts are on the same line in the municipality. Line S 42 of the Heilbronn Stadtbahn stops at all three stations every half hour.

The town lies near the A 6 (junction Heilbronn/Untereisesheim).

=== Media ===
The Heilbronner Stimme (edition north-middle) and the official paper Wimpfener Heimat-Bote report on the happenings of the area.

=== Education ===
In Bad Wimpfen there is a primary school, Hauptschule incl. Werkrealschule containing around 380 pupils.

In addition, there is the Hohenstaufen-Gymnasium which has more than 900 students from Bad Wimpfen and its surrounding municipalities.

=== Health ===
The urban health centre of Bad Wimpfen (former cure hospital) cares about 4800 patients by a staff of around 200.

== Notable people ==
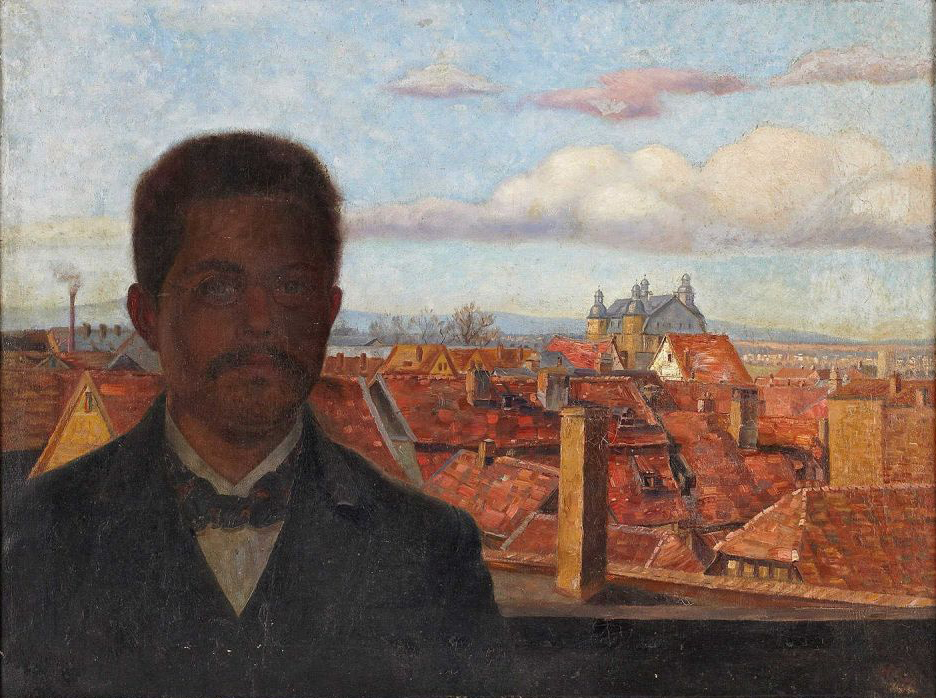
Carl Geist Self-portrait 1906

- Ignaz von Beecke (1733–1803), composer and pianist
- Franziskus Eisenbach (1943–2024), auxiliary bishop of Mainz
- Carl Geist (1870–1931), painter
- Daniel Jobst Müller (born 1965), Professor of Biophysics

== Literature ==
- Ludwig Frohnhäuser: Geschichte der Reichsstadt Wimpfen, des Ritterstifts St. Peter zu Wimpfen im Thal, des Dominicanerklosters und des Hospitals zum hl. Geist zu Wimpfen am Berg. Darmstadt 1870, Nachdruck Verein Alt Wimpfen 1982.
- A. von Lorent: Wimpfen am Neckar - geschichtlich und topographisch. Stuttgart 1870, Nachdruck Verein Alt Wimpfen 1982.
- Georg Schäfer: Kunstdenkmäler im Großherzogthum Hessen, Provinz Starkenburg. ehemaliger Kreis Wimpfen. Darmstadt 1898.
- Fritz Arens, Reinhold Bührlen: Wimpfen – Geschichte und Kunstdenkmäler. Bad Wimpfen (Verein Alt Wimpfen) 1954, 1991.
- Rüdiger Jülch: Die Entwicklung des Wirtschaftsplatzes Wimpfen bis zum Ausgang des Mittelalters. W. Kohlhammer, Stuttgart 1961.
- Walter Carlé: Die Geschichte der Salinen zu Wimpfen. Stuttgart (Zeitschrift für Württembergische Landesgeschichte XXIV) 1965
- Albrecht Endriss: Die religiös-kirchlichen Verhältnisse in der Reichsstadt Wimpfen vor der Reformation. Stuttgart (W. Kohlhammer)1967.
- Klaus-Peter Schroeder: Wimpfen. Verfassungsgeschichte einer Stadt. Kohlhammer Verlag, Stuttgart 1973.
- Andreas Hafer: Wimpfen. Stadt-Raum-Beziehungen im späten Mittelalter. Stuttgart (W. Kohlhammer) 1993.
- Franz Götzfried (Hrsg.): Salz und Sole in Wimpfen. Beiträge zur Wimpfener Stadt- und Salinengeschichte. Bad Wimpfen 2002.
- Erich Scheible: Die Geschichte der hessischen Exklave Wimpfen. Bd. 1: 1802 bis 1836. Bad Wimpfen (Verein Alt Wimpfen) 2004.
