= Meckesheim station =

Railway junction in Germany

Meckesheim
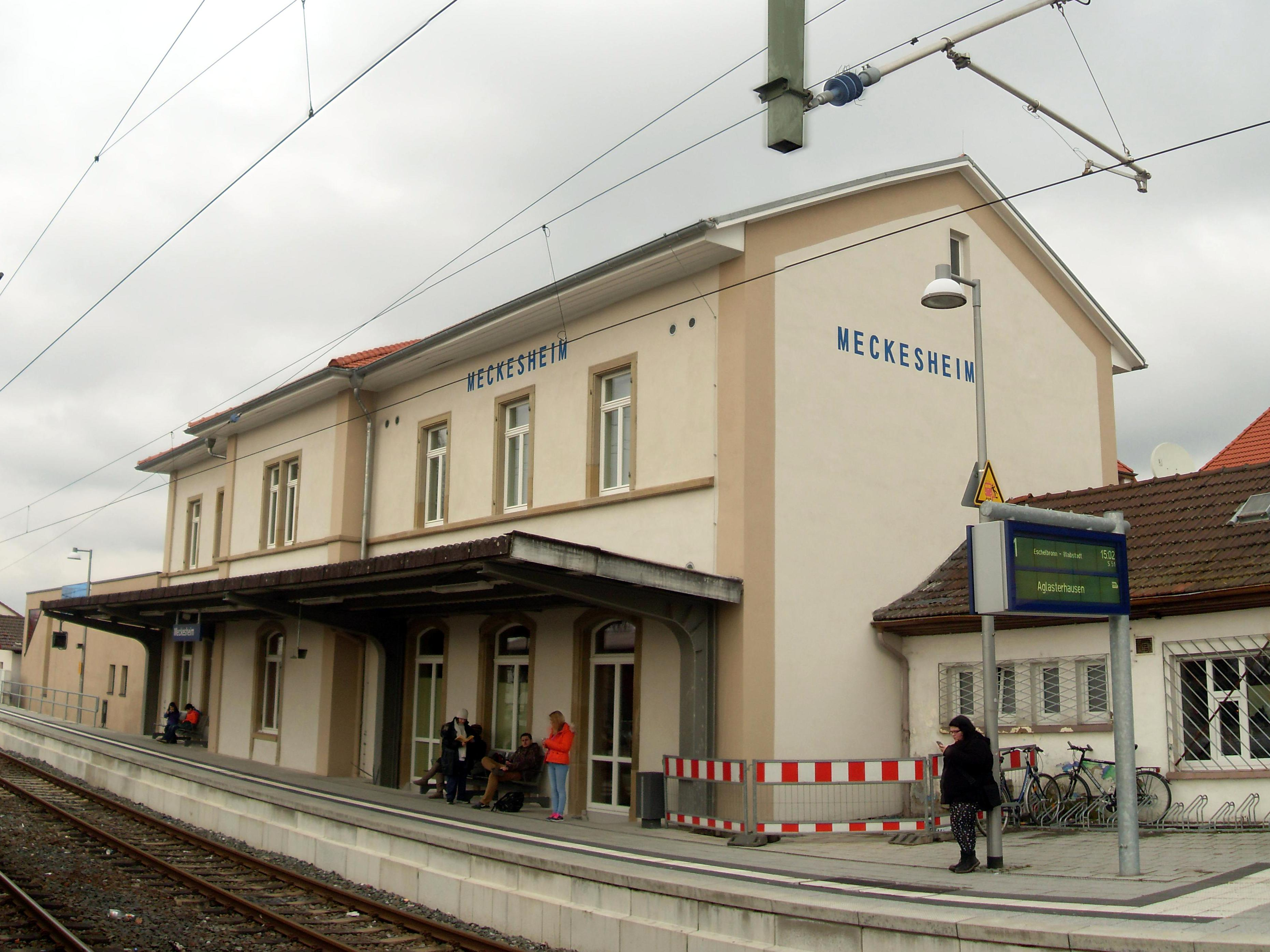
- Station building (2014)

General information
- Location: Bahnhofstr. 29, Meckesheim, Baden-Württemberg; Germany
- Coordinates: 49°19′15″N 8°48′47″E
- Owner: Deutsche Bahn
- Operator: DB Netz; DB Station&Service
- Lines: Elsenz Valley Railway (km 0.0); Schwarzbach Valley Railway (km 19.8); until 1990: Nebenbahn Wiesloch–Meckesheim (km 18.8)
- Platforms: 3

Construction
- Accessible: Yes

Other information
- Station code: 4017
- DS100 code: RMK
- IBNR: 8003932
- Category: 4
- Fare zone: VRN: 146
- Website: www.bahnhof.de

History
- Opened: 1862

Services
| Preceding station | (Stuttgart) | Following station |
|---|---|---|
| Neckargemünd towards Mannheim Hbf | RE 10b | Sinsheim (Elsenz) Hbf towards Heilbronn |
| Preceding station | Rhine-Neckar S-Bahn | Following station |
| Mauer (b Heidelberg) towards Heidelberg Hbf | S5 | Zuzenhausen towards Eppingen or Bad Rappenau |
| Mauer (b Heidelberg) towards Heidelberg Hbf | S51 | Eschelbronn towards Aglasterhausen |
Location

Meckesheim station is a small railway junction in Meckesheim, North Baden in the German state of Baden-Württemberg. It is located on the Neckargemünd–Bad Friedrichshall railway and is classified by Deutsche Bahn as a category 4 station. The Schwarzbach Valley Railway branches off the Elsenz Valley Railway to Aglasterhausen in Meckesheim. Until 1990, the Wiesloch–Meckesheim/Waldangelloch railway also branched off via Schatthausen to Wiesloch Stadt and Wiesloch-Walldorf.

== History ==
Meckesheimer station was opened on 23 October 1862 by the Grand Duchy of Baden State Railway (Großherzoglich Badische Staatseisenbahnen) together with the section of line from Neckargemünd to Meckesheim as part of the Odenwald Railway from Heidelberg to Mosbach and Würzburg. The section from Meckesheim to Bad Rappenau followed for 25 June 1868.

The Meckesheim–Neckarelz railway was also opened as an extension of the Neckargemünd–Meckesheim line in 1862. As a result, Meckesheim became a junction station.

The 19 km (12 mi)-long line from Wiesloch-Walldorf via Wiesloch Stadt to Meckesheim was opened on 14 May 1901, providing a link between the Rhine Valley Railway to the Elsenz Valley Railway.

As a result of the hyperinflation in the Weimar Republic, the Schatthausen–Meckesheim section of the Wiesloch–Meckesheim branch line was closed in 1922.

Several people were killed and the station was destroyed in an Allied air raid on 24 March 1945. A memorial stone was erected on platform 1 to commemorate the lives lost in the destruction.

The Aglasterhausen–Obrigheim section of Schwarzbach Valley Railway was closed at the timetable change on 25 September 1971. At the same time, Deutsche Bundesbahn sought to close the remaining Meckesheim–Aglasterhausen section. On 1 January 1982, Südwestdeutsche Eisenbahn-Gesellschaft (SWEG) took over the line from Deutsche Bundesbahn under a fixed 20-year lease.

As of May 2007, some sections had been replaced by bus; staff shortages meant that rail services were replaced by buses on the section from Meckesheim to Aglasterhausen on weekends and holidays from August 2007. All rail passenger services were suspended on the line to Aglasterhausen from 1 August 2009. A replacement bus service was established.

With the transfer of responsibility for the Elsenz Valley Railway and the Schwarzbach Valley Railway to the Rhine-Neckar S-Bahn, Meckesheim station along with the entire Elsenz Valley Railway and the Schwarzbach Valley Railway were completely modernised and electrified. The new S5 line from Heidelberg via the Elsenz Valley Railway to Sinsheim or continuing hourly over the Steinsfurt–Eppingen railway to Eppingen was taken into operation at the timetable change in December 2009.

The opening of line S51 (Heidelberg–Meckesheim–Aglasterhausen), which had been also expected at the timetable change in December 2009, was in fact opened in June 2010 due to delays mainly caused by the severe winter of 2009/10.

== Operations ==
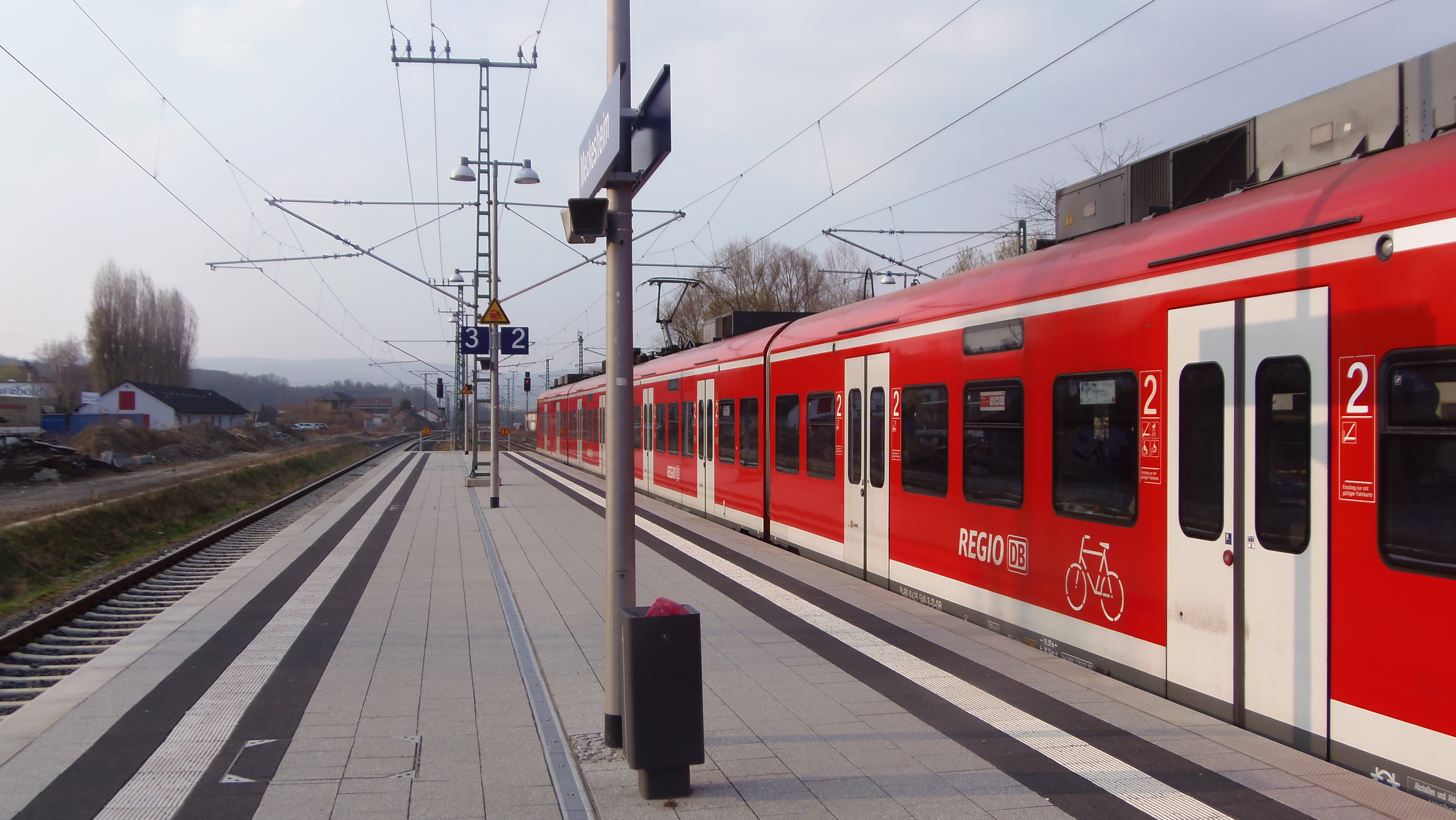
Platform in Meckesheim

The Meckesheim station is served every hour by the S5 service (Heidelberg–Neckargemünd–Meckesheim–Sinsheim–Eppingen) of the Rhine-Neckar S-Bahn. There are also hourly services of the S51 (Heidelberg–Neckargemünd–Meckesheim–Waibstadt–Aglasterhausen) which sometimes begin or end in Meckesheim. The combination of lines S5 and S51 results in services every 30 minutes on the Heidelberg–Meckesheim section. In the peak hour, the S-Bahn services on the Meckesheim–Aglasterhausen and the Heidelberg–Sinsheim sections both operate every 30 minutes. Also a single S-Bahn EMU runs via Heidelberg to Mainz. This is an advance service, as the S-Bahn services on the Elsenz Valley Railway and the Schwarzbach Valley Railway are expected to run regularly to Mainz from December 2017. Every two hours, there are also RE 10b (Regional-Express) services on the Mannheim–Heidelberg–Meckesheim–Sinsheim–Heilbronn route.

- RE 10b Mannheim – Heidelberg – Meckesheim – Sinsheim – Bad Friedrichshall – Heilbronn
- S5 Heidelberg – Neckargemünd – Meckesheim – Sinsheim – Steinsfurt – Eppingen
- S51 (Heidelberg – Neckargemünd –) Meckesheim – Waibstadt – Neckarbischofsheim Nord – Aglasterhausen

== Platforms ==
Meckesheim station has three platform tracks. Platform 1 is located next to the entrance building. It is used by S-Bahn line S51 services that start or end in Meckesheim to/from Aglasterhausen. Tracks 2 and 3 share an island platform. Track 2 is used for trains towards Heidelberg/Mannheim and track 3 by trains towards Eppingen/Heilbronn/Aglasterhausen.
