= Meckesheim–Neckarelz railway =

Railway line

Schwarzbach Valley Railway
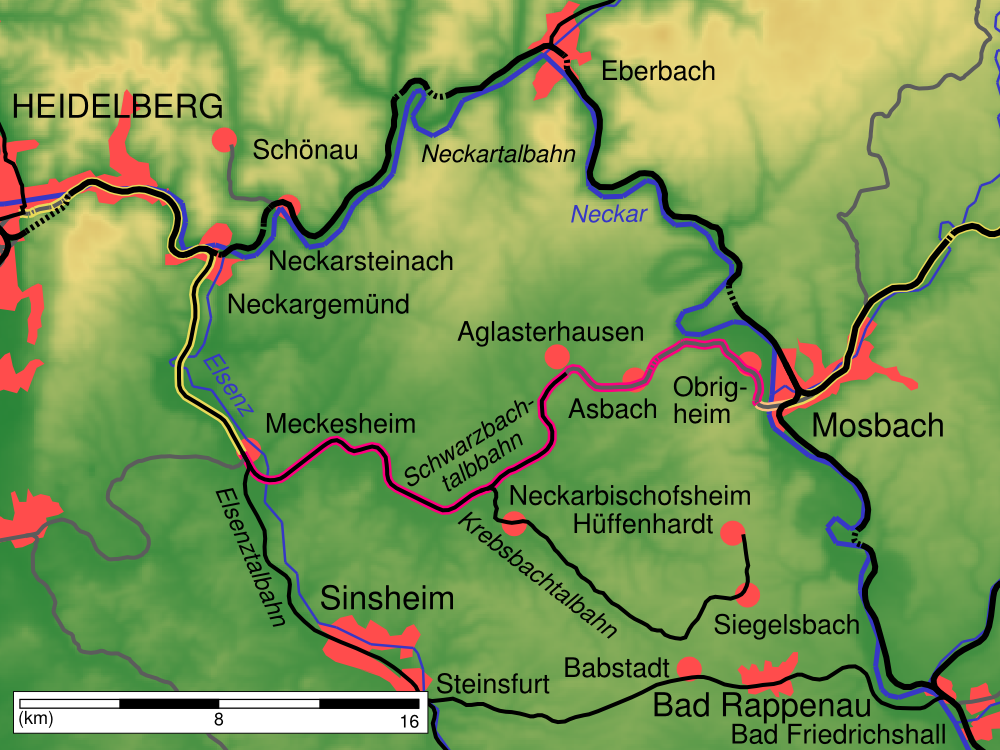

Overview
- Native name: Schwarzbachtalbahn
- Line number: 4110 (HD-Karlst.–Meckesh.–N'elz)
- Locale: Baden-Württemberg, Germany
- Termini: Meckesheim; Neckarelz

Service
- Route number: 707

Technical
- Line length: 30.8 km (19.1 mi); operational: 19.1 km (11.9 mi)
- Track gauge: 1,435 mm (4 ft 8 1/2 in) standard gauge
- Minimum radius: 330 m (1,083 ft)
- Maximum incline: 1.4%

The Meckesheim–Neckarelz railway is a branch line in northern Baden between Meckesheim and Aglasterhausen that used to run to Neckarelz. It was part of the former Baden Oldenwald Railway from Heidelberg to Würzburg, and thus a main line, which is why its trackbed was built for two tracks. The section remaining today also goes under the name of Schwarzbach Valley Railway (German: Schwarzbachtalbahn).

== Route ==
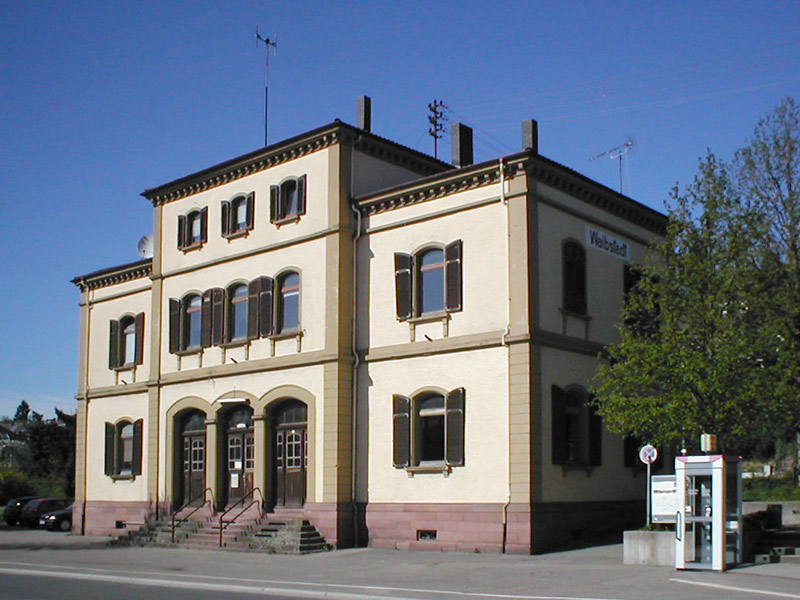
Waibstadt station building (Apr 2007)

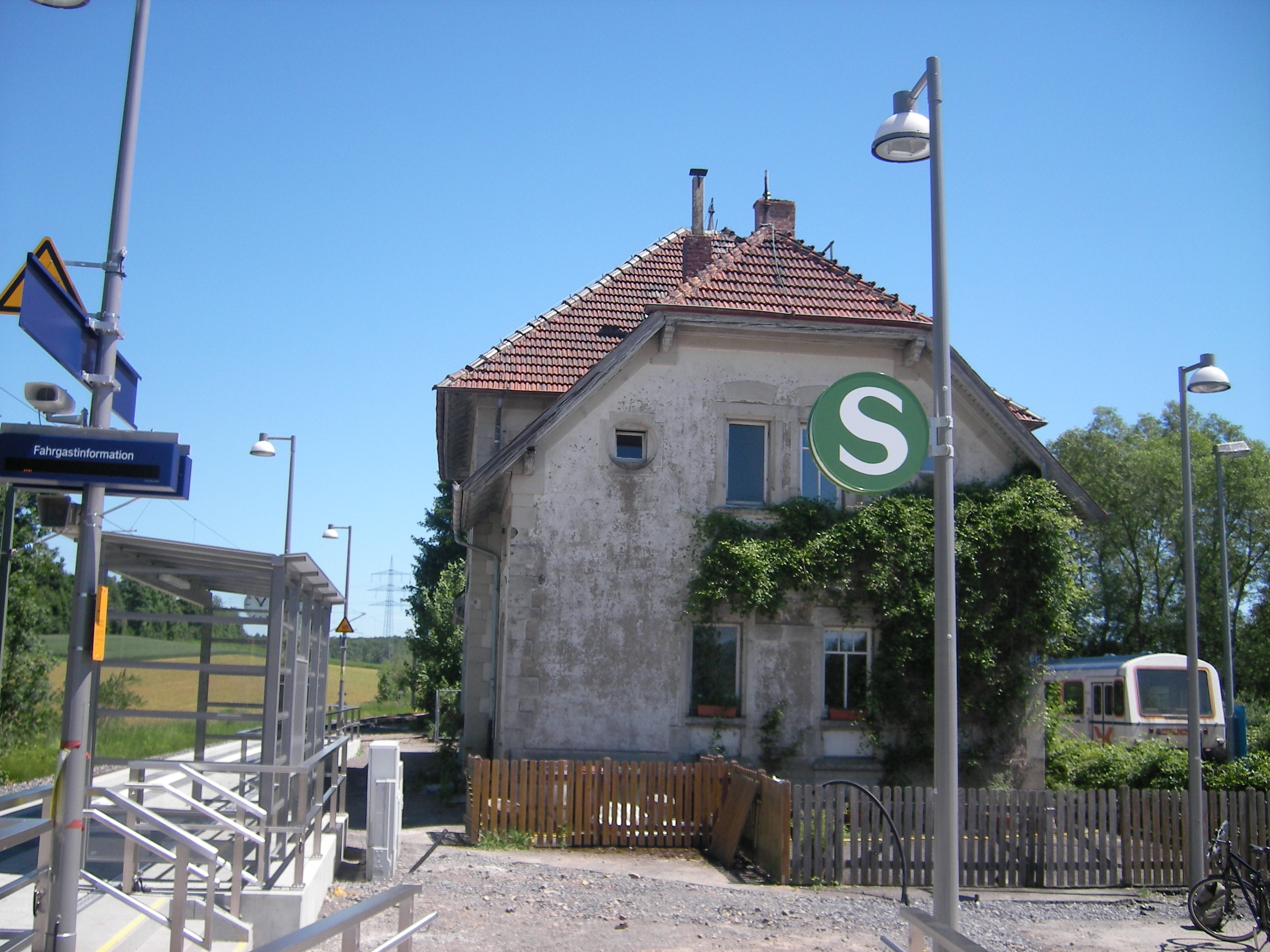
Modernised Neckarbischofsheim Nord station

The line runs on the border between the Kleiner Odenwald ("Little Odenwald") and the Kraichgau regions. It is also now known as the Schwarzbach Valley Railway (Schwarzbachtalbahn) as the remaining section of the line follows the Schwarzbach, a right tributary of the Elsenz river.

It also has no major engineering structures because it runs consistently in the valley between Meckenheim and Aglasterhausen. The now disused section between Aglasterhausen and Neckarelz had more difficult topographical conditions, however, so a total of three tunnels were built. The naming of the Kalksberg Tunnel is curious, as the tunnel runs under the Karlsberg (mountain), not the Kalksberg.

On the remaining section of line there are just two bridges that are more than twenty metres long. One crosses the Elsenz between Meckenheim and Eschelbronn. The other bridge crosses federal highway 292 between Waibstadt and Neckarbischofsheim Nord. The biggest bridge on the line used to be the bridge over the Neckar between Obrigheim and Neckarelz, which was blown up by the retreating German army in 1945.

=== Railway stations ===
The remaining section of the line passes through relatively large towns and the stations are conveniently located for each centre, except for Neckarbischofsheim Nord station. Between Aglasterhausen and Neckarelz on the other hand, the intermediate station, except for Obrigheim, were far from the places they served, which were just very small villages. Therefore, the section had low utilisation, ultimately leading to its closure.

The Krebsbach Valley Railway branched off from Neckarbischofsheim Nord station to Hüffenhardt. This station is not, however, even in the district of Neckarbischofsheim, but three km away in the district of Bernau in the neighbouring town of Waibstadt.

== History ==
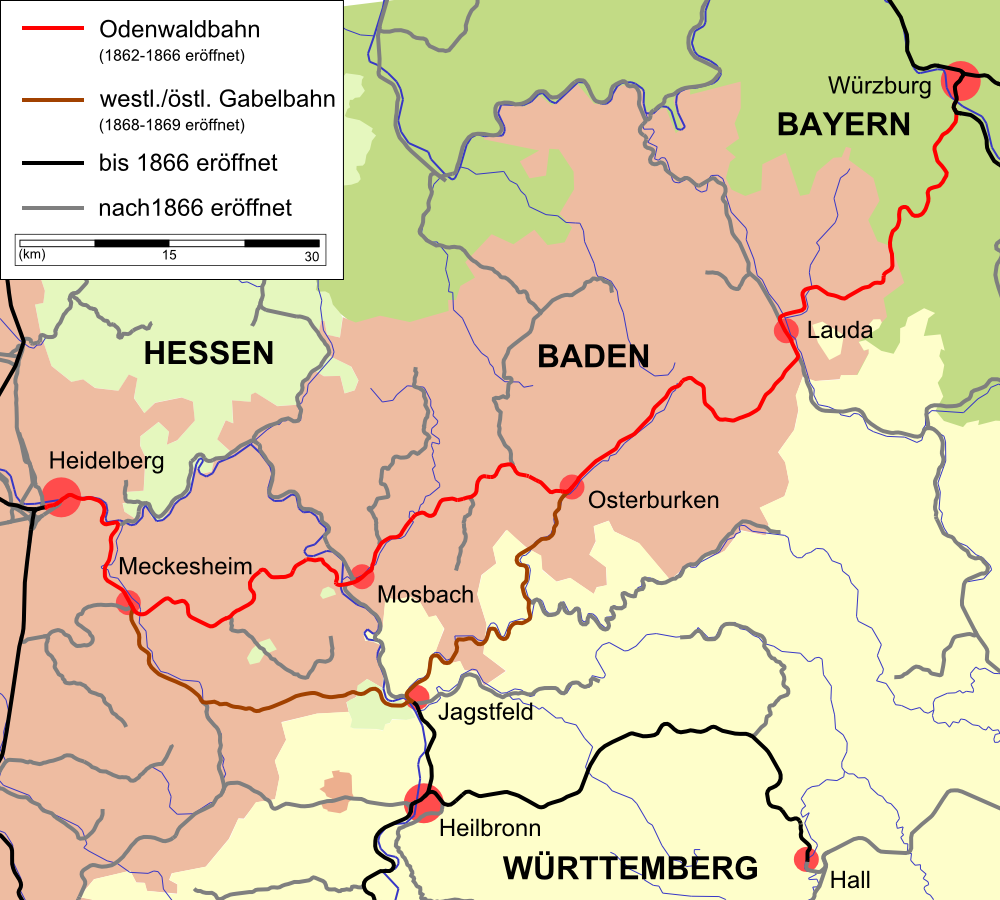
Historical route of the Odenwald Railway

The Meckenheim-Neckarelz route was built as part of the Odenwald Railway (Odenwaldbahn) from Heidelberg to Würzburg via Mosbach. It was built mainly at the insistence of Bavaria to connect with its former Rhine province of the Palatinate railway. Apart from closing the gap between Ludwigshafen at the end of the Palatine Ludwig Railway and Mannheim on the Rhine Valley Railway, a line was required to run east from the Rhine Valley Railway at Heidelberg to Würzburg. The best route in terms of topography was along the Neckar valley to the town of Eberbach, but this was ruled out because it ran through the Grand Duchy of Hesse.

Between Heidelberg and Mosbach various routes were considered, one via Sinsheim, another via Mönchzell and Spechbach, a third to Aglasterhausen and along the Schwarzenbach valley. It was finally decided to follow the Neckar valley to Neckargemünd, the Elsenz valley to Meckenheim and the Schwarzenbach valley to close to its source, before tunneling through the ridge and descending to the Neckar and crossing it to Mosbach. The line then continued to the north-east of Baden via Osterburken and Lauda to Würzburg.

On 7 May 1858 the proposed route of the Odenwald Railway between Heidelberg and Mosbach was formally adopted. The plans for the line provided for two tracks from the beginning, but only a single track was built. Construction of the Mörtelstein Tunnel and bridge across the Neckar between Obrigheim and Neckarelz were particularly costly. The lack of sufficient funds and the outbreak of the Second Italian War of Independence in northern Italy created a crisis for the project, even bringing construction to a standstill between 18 April and 20 October 1859. In 1861, a flood on the Neckar delayed the completion of the bridge at Neckarelz.

=== Operations under the Baden State Railways and Deutsche Reichsbahn (1862–1945) ===
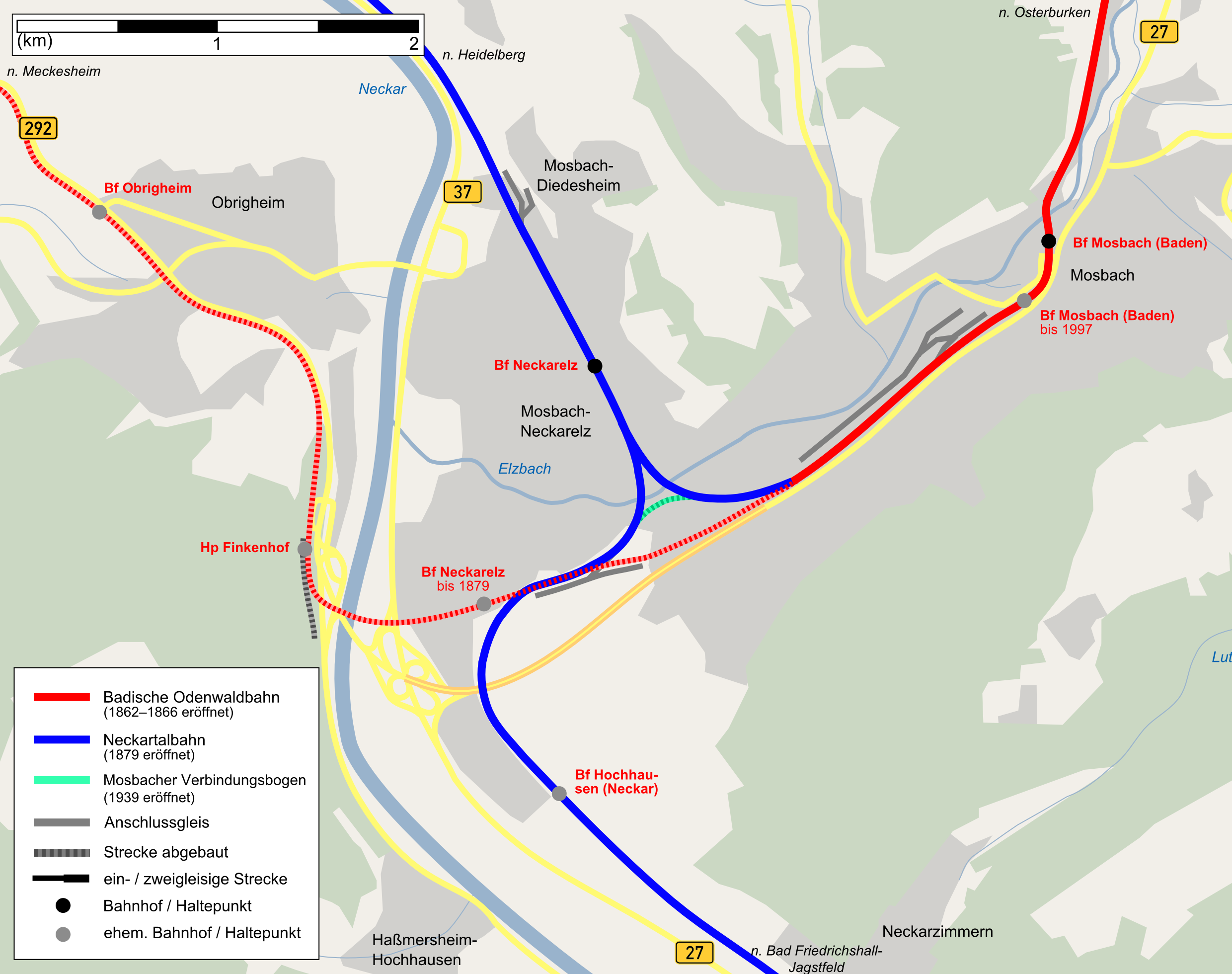
Development of the railways near Neckarelz

The Grand Duchy of Baden State Railway, which operated the line in Baden from 1840 to 1920, when it was absorbed by Deutsche Reichsbahn, opened the Odenwald Railway between Heidelberg and Mosbach on 23 October 1862. Traffic volume remained lower than expected, especially after 24 May 1879, when the Neckar Valley Railway opened on the Neckargemünd–Neckarsteinach–Eberbach–Neckarelz–Mosbach route, converting the Meckenheim–Neckarelz section into a de facto branch line in the following years, as trains on the Heidelberg–Würzburg route preferred to use the gentler Neckar Valley Railway. The section had the lowest traffic levels of any sections of the Baden Odenwald Railway. Despite its alignment making provision for double track, the line remained single-track.

With the opening of the Neckar Valley Railway, Neckarelz station, which was previously located on the southern outskirts, was moved on to the new line and away from the old Odenwald Railway.

In 1887 Neckarbischofsheim station was opened. The Krebsbach Valley Railway branch line was opened from Neckarbischofsheim to Hüffenhardt up the Krebsbach Valley on 15 October 1902, partly to serve the limestone quarries between the towns of Helmhof and Obergimpern.

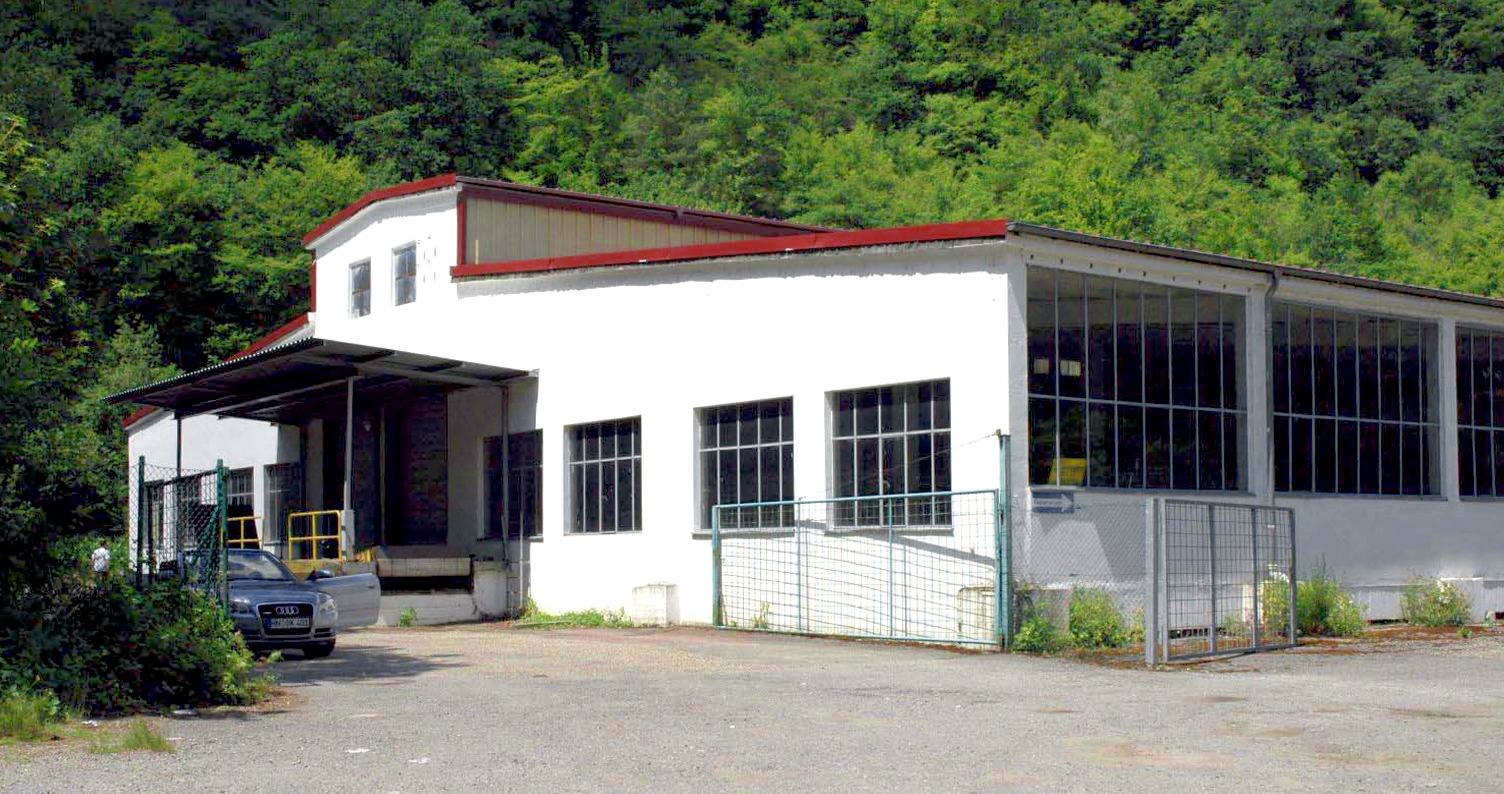
Former warehouse of the Goldfisch weapons factory at the former Finkenhof halt (July 2006)

From 1944 to 1945 Neckarelz concentration camp was a sub-camp of the Natzweiler-Struthof concentration camp. Prisoners provided forced labour to an Obrigheim supplier of materials for a planned underground weapons factory with the code name of Goldfisch ("gold fish"). Finkenhof halt was established nearby on a siding between Obrigheim and Neckarelz.

On 30 March 1945, German troops retreating to the southeast blew up the Neckarelz railway bridge to impede the advance of the Allies, as it was the only permanent river crossing on a long section of the Neckar. Because of the relatively low importance of the railway it was not rebuilt after the war.

=== Partial closure and privatisation (1945–2010) ===
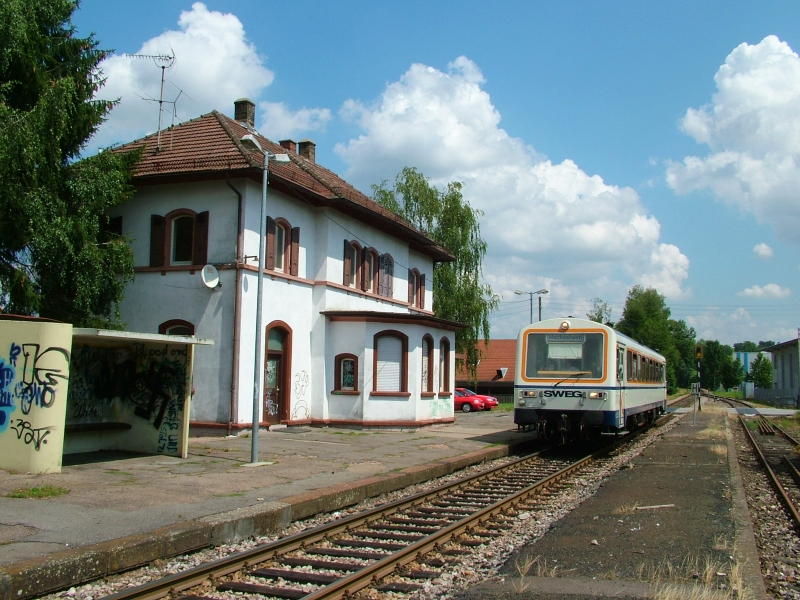
A SWEG NE-81 railbus in Helmstadt (July 2004)

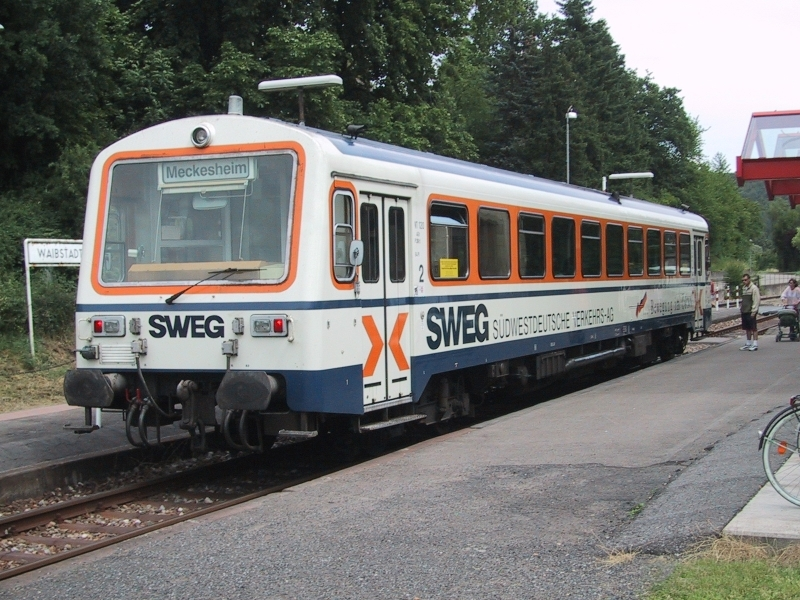
A SWEG NE-81 railbus Waibstadt station (July 2001)

After World War II the newly founded Deutsche Bundesbahn operated the remaining line between Meckesheim and Obrigheim. The section between Obrigheim and Neckarelz had been disused since 1945 and it was officially closed on 9 September 1949. From the 1950s the remaining line was increasingly served by railbuses. At that time Neckarbischofsheim station was renamed Neckarbischofsheim Nord station and a new station was opened between Aglasterhausen and Asbach at Daudenzell. The efforts of the Sinsheim district to have the bridge over the Neckar, which was destroyed in 1945, rebuilt were unsuccessful.

Because of the maintenance costs, the Federal Ministry of Transport on 10 May 1971 authorised the closure for all traffic of the Aglasterhausen–Obrigheim section with its two tunnels, which was implemented at the timetable change of 25 September 1971.

On 1 January 1982 the state-owned South-West German Railway Company (Südwestdeutsche Eisenbahn-Gesellschaft, SWEG) took over the line from Deutsche Bundesbahn under a 20-year lease. The Krebsbach Valley Railway from Neckarbischofsheim Nord to Hüffenhardt, which the government planned to close, was also operated by the SWEG.

The lease of the Schwarzenbach Valley Railway to the SWEG was the first regionalisation of a state-owned railway in Germany. The SWEG modernised and streamlined operations to a large extent. For example, the timetabling was greatly improved. The modernisation measures allowed the SWEG to increase ridership and thus to preserve the route from closure.

=== Integration into the network of the Rhine-Neckar S-Bahn (since 2010) ===
It was originally planned to start Rhine-Neckar S-Bahn operations with class 425 electric multiple units of the new S 51 service on the Schwarzbach Valley Railway on 14 December 2009. Due to a delayed start of construction and the severe winter of 2009/10, however, the start-up of the S-Bahn was delayed to June 2010. The track was completely modernised and electrified for the opening of the S-Bahn. In 2002, the expired lease for the line was extended for one year only. From 1 August 2009 the entire passenger service on the line was closed and it was replaced by a temporary bus service. In December 2009 DB Regio took over the operation of the replacement bus service.
