= RMW (disambiguation) =

RMW may refer to:

- Read–modify–write, a CPU instruction to simultaneously read and write a value in memory
- Reliance MediaWorks, a film and entertainment services company
- rmw, the ISO 639 code for Welsh Romani language
- Radius of maximum wind, the distance between the center of a cyclone and its band of strongest winds
- Mannheim-Waldhof station, the DS100 code RMW
