= Neckargemünd station =

Railway station in Neckargemünd, Germany

Neckargemünd
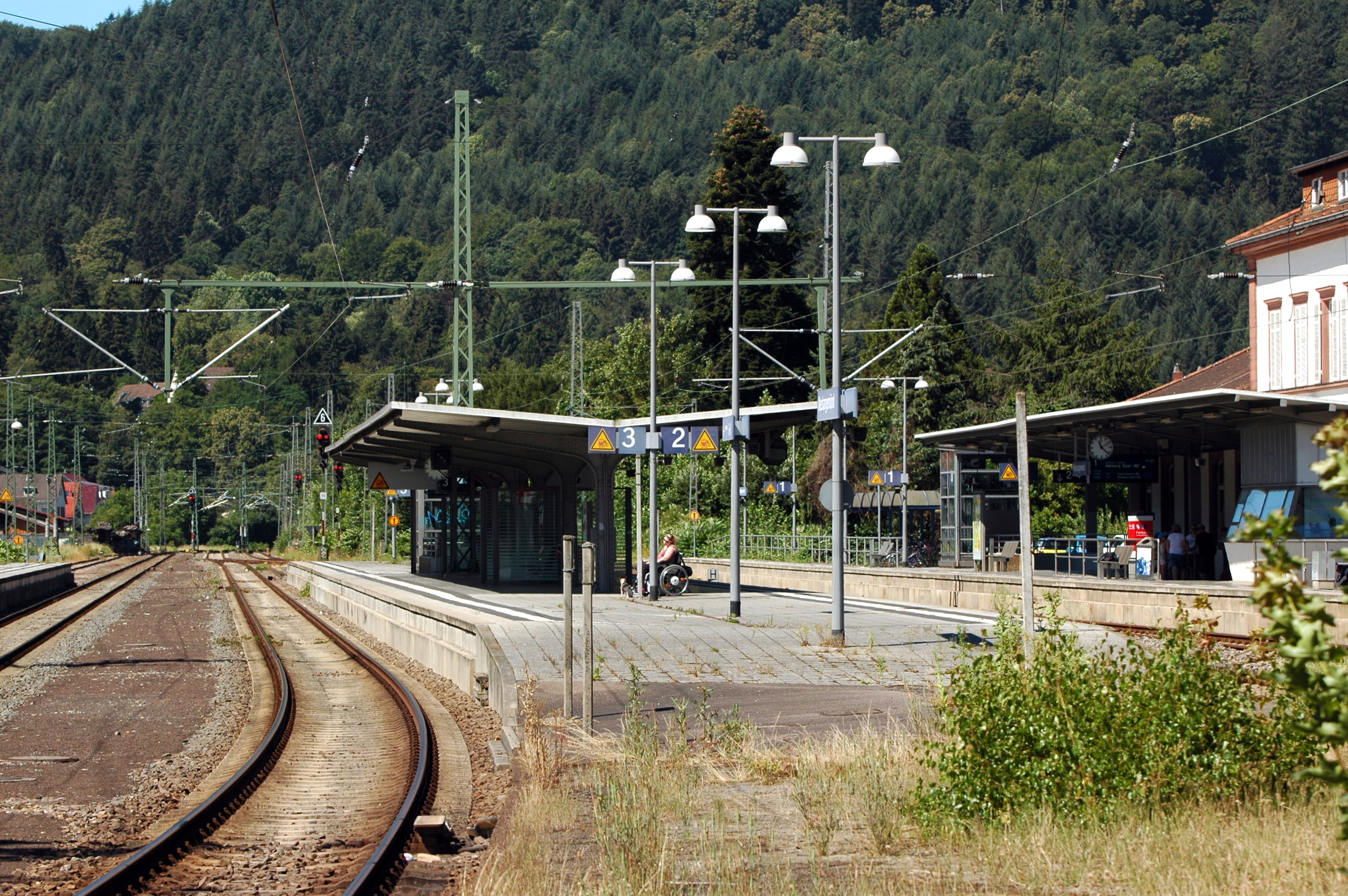
- 2018

General information
- Location: Bahnhofstraße 19; 69151 Neckargemünd; Baden-Württemberg; Germany
- Coordinates: 49.3940°N 8.7882°E
- Elevation: 126 m (413 ft)
- Owner: Deutsche Bahn
- Operator: DB Netz; DB Station&Service
- Lines: Neckar Valley Railway (KBS 665.1–2); Elsenz Valley Railway (KBS 665.5)
- Platforms: 1 island platform 2 side platforms
- Tracks: 4
- Train operators: SWEG Bahn Stuttgart; Rhine-Neckar S-Bahn
- Connections: S1 S2 S5 S51

Construction
- Parking: yes
- Cycle facilities: yes
- Accessible: yes

Other information
- Station code: 4317
- DS100 code: RNM
- IBNR: 8000265
- Category: 3
- Fare zone: VRN: 136
- Website: www.bahnhof.de

Services
Preceding station	(Stuttgart)	Following station
Heidelberg Hbf towards Mannheim Hbf	RE 10a	Eberbach towards Heilbronn
Heidelberg Hbf towards Mannheim Hbf	RE 10b	Meckesheim towards Heilbronn
Preceding station	Rhine-Neckar S-Bahn	Following station
Heidelberg Orthopädie towards Homburg (Saar) Hbf	S1	Neckargemünd Altstadt towards Osterburken
Heidelberg Orthopädie towards Kaiserslautern Hbf	S2	Neckargemünd Altstadt towards Mosbach (Baden)
Heidelberg Orthopädie towards Heidelberg Hbf	S5	Bammental towards Eppingen or Bad Rappenau
Heidelberg Orthopädie towards Heidelberg Hbf	S51	Bammental towards Aglasterhausen
Location

Neckargemünd station is a railway station in the municipality of Neckargemünd, located in the Rhein-Neckar-Kreis in Baden-Württemberg, Germany.
