= Eberbach station =

Railway station in Baden-Württemberg, Germany

Eberbach
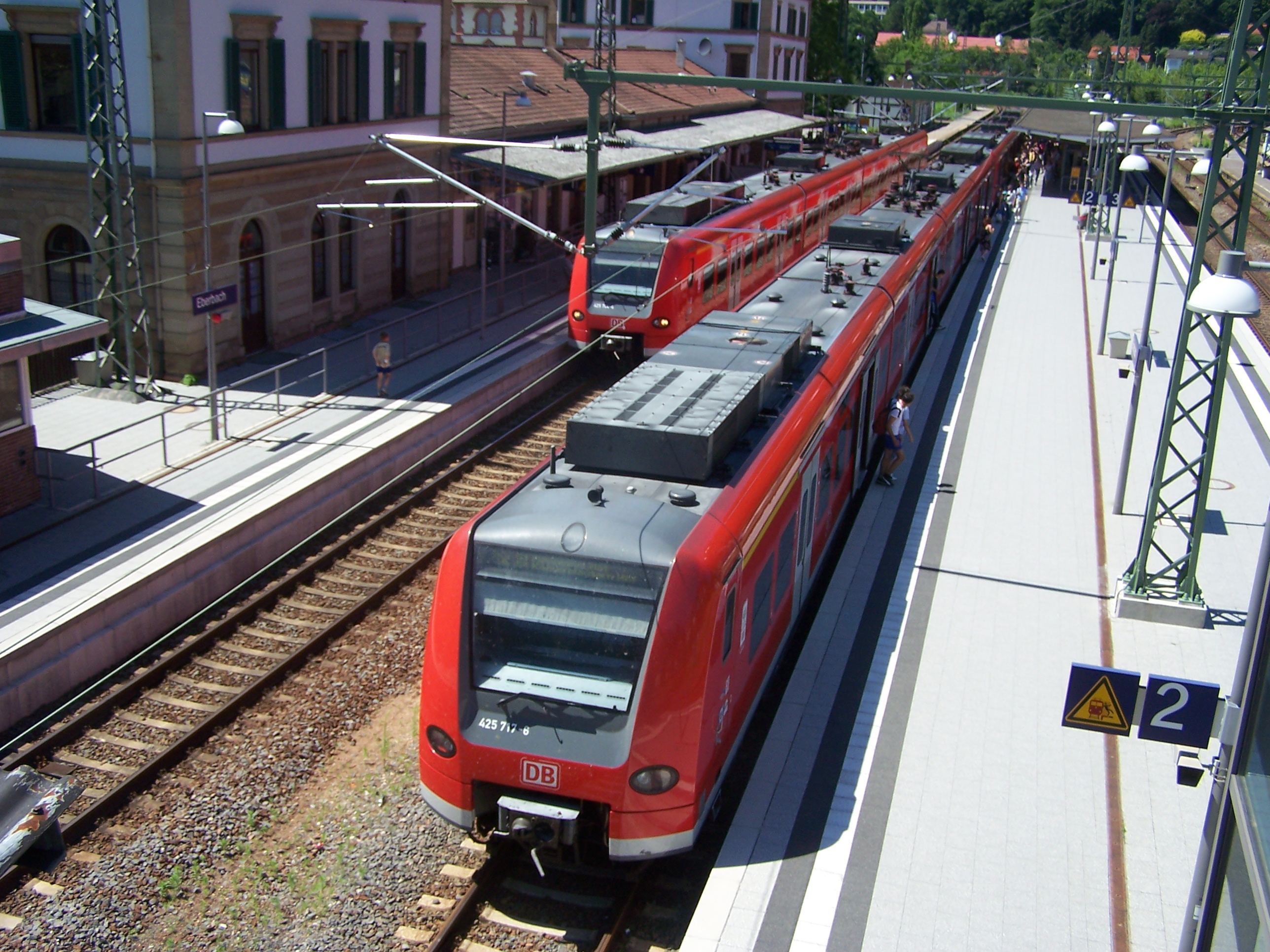
- 2006

General information
- Location: Bahnhofplatz 1; 69412 Eberbach (Baden); Baden-Württemberg; Germany
- Coordinates: 49.4654°N 8.9842°E
- Owner: Deutsche Bahn
- Operator: DB InfraGO
- Lines: Neckar Valley Railway (KBS 705); Odenwald Railway (KBS 641)
- Platforms: 2 island platforms 1 side platform
- Tracks: 5
- Train operators: SWEG Bahn Stuttgart; DB Regio Mitte (Rhine-Neckar S-Bahn); VIAS Rail
- Connections: 50 56 50N 801 802 803 804 805 807 808 809 821 822

Construction
- Parking: yes
- Cycle facilities: yes
- Accessible: yes

Other information
- Station code: 1432
- DS100 code: REA
- IBNR: 8000369
- Category: 3
- Fare zone: VRN: 107; : 4445 (VRN transitional tariff)
- Website: www.bahnhof.de

Services
Preceding station	(Stuttgart)	Following station
Neckargemünd towards Mannheim Hbf	RE 10a	Mosbach-Neckarelz towards Heilbronn
Preceding station	VIAS	Following station
Hesseneck Kailbach towards Darmstadt Hbf	RB 81	Terminus
Hesseneck Kailbach towards Frankfurt (Main) Hbf	RB 82	Terminus
Preceding station	Rhine-Neckar S-Bahn	Following station
Hirschhorn (Neckar) towards Homburg (Saar) Hbf	S1	Lindach towards Osterburken
Hirschhorn (Neckar) towards Kaiserslautern Hbf	S2	Lindach towards Mosbach (Baden)
Location

Eberbach station (German: Bahnhof Eberbach) is a railway station in the municipality of Eberbach (Baden), located in the Rhein-Neckar-Kreis in Baden-Württemberg, Germany.
