= Heppenheim (Bergstraße) station =

Railway station in Heppenheim, Germany

Heppenheim (Bergstraße)
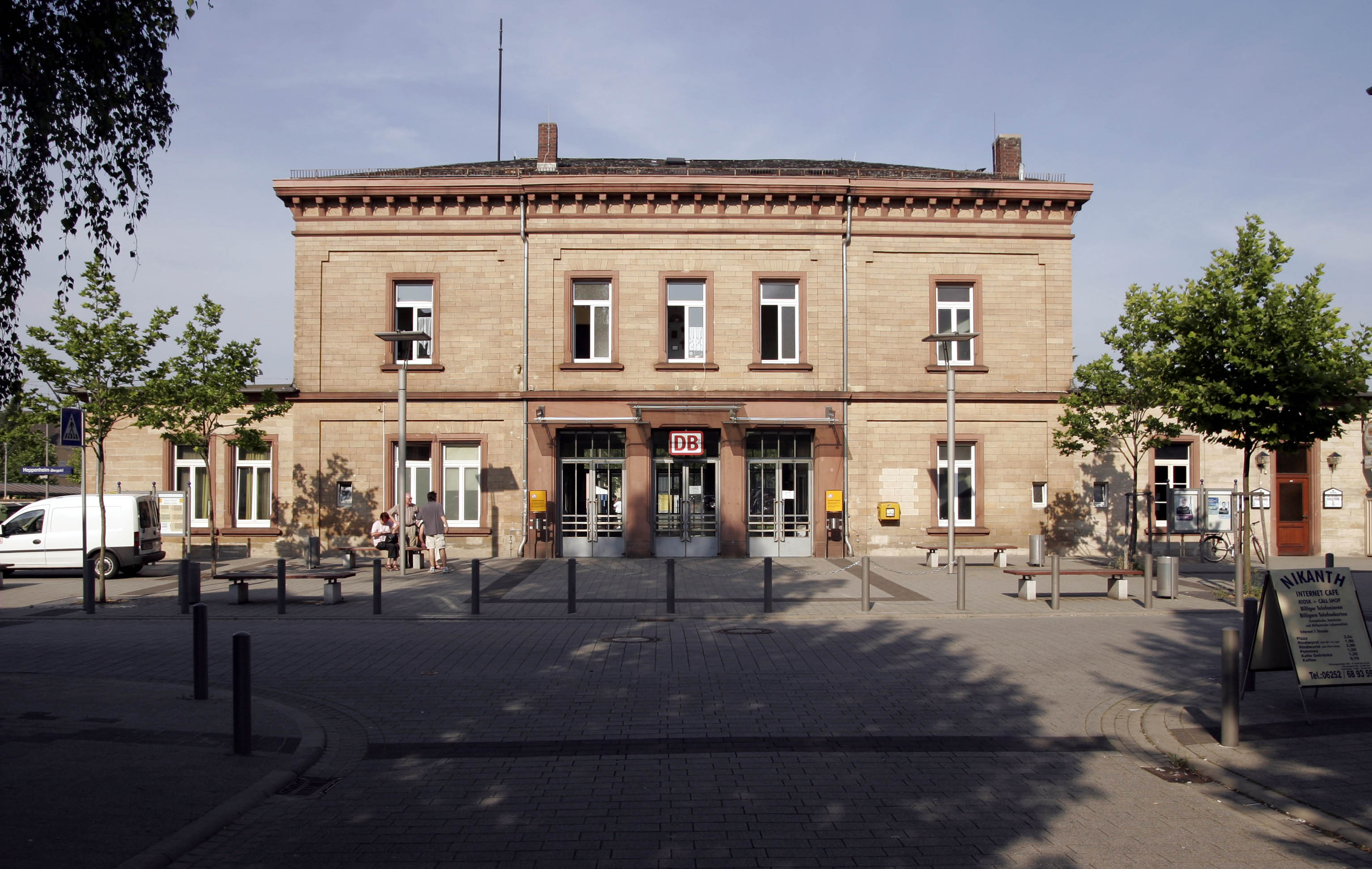
- Heppenheim station in 2007

General information
- Location: Kalterer Str. 4, Heppenheim, Hesse; Germany
- Coordinates: 49°38′30″N 8°38′0″E
- Owner: Deutsche Bahn
- Operator: DB Station&Service
- Lines: Main-Neckar Railway (53.6 km); Nibelungen Railway (5.2 km) (closed)
- Platforms: 2

Construction
- Accessible: Yes

Other information
- Station code: 2693
- DS100 code: FHP
- IBNR: 8002757
- Category: 5
- Fare zone: VRN: 35 and 55; : 4560 (VRN transitional tariff)
- Website: www.bahnhof.de

History
- Opened: 22 June 1846

Services
| Preceding station | DB Regio Mitte | Following station |
|---|---|---|
| Bensheim towards Frankfurt (Main) Hbf | RE 60 | Hemsbach towards Mannheim Hbf |
| Bensheim towards Frankfurt (Main) Hbf | RB 67 | Laudenbach (Bergstr) towards Mannheim Hbf or Hockenheim |
| Bensheim towards Frankfurt (Main) Hbf | RB 68 | Laudenbach (Bergstr) towards Wiesloch-Walldorf |
| Preceding station | Rhine-Neckar S-Bahn | Following station |
| Laudenbach (Bergstr) towards Mainz Hbf | S6 | Bensheim Terminus |
Location
- Location within Hesse Location within Germany Location within Europe

Heppenheim (Bergstraße) station is a station in the town of Heppenheim and it is the most southerly station in the German state of Hesse on the Main-Neckar Railway between Frankfurt and Heidelberg. It is served by regional services and an S-Bahn service. On weekdays the station is served by one Intercity services on the long-distance network of Deutsche Bahn. The station is classified by Deutsche Bahn as a category 5 station.

== History ==
The station was opened along with the Langen–Darmstadt–Heppenheim section of the Main-Neckar Railway on 22 June 1846. During the Baden Revolution of 1848 the station was occupied many times.

In 1903, the Lorsch–Heppenheim section of the Nibelungen Railway was opened. Because of the failure to connect to the Odenwald, traffic on the Nibelungen Railway was below expectations. Several decades later, the Heppenheim–Lorsch line was closed and dismantled.

== Rail services ==
=== Long-distance services ===
On weekdays, there is one InterCity service to Frankfurt and Saarbrücken.

=== Regional services ===
- RE 60: Mannheim – Weinheim – Heppenheim – Bensheim – Darmstadt – Frankfurt (every 2 hours)
- RB 68: Heidelberg – Weinheim – Heppenheim – Bensheim – Darmstadt– Frankfurt (hourly)
- RB 67: Mannheim – Weinheim – Heppenheim – Bensheim (hourly)

=== Rhine-Neckar S-Bahn ===
- S6: Bensheim – Heppenheim – Weinheim – Mannheim – Ludwigshafen Mitte – Ludwigshafen Hbf – Frankenthal – Worms – Mainz (hourly)

== Station facilities ==
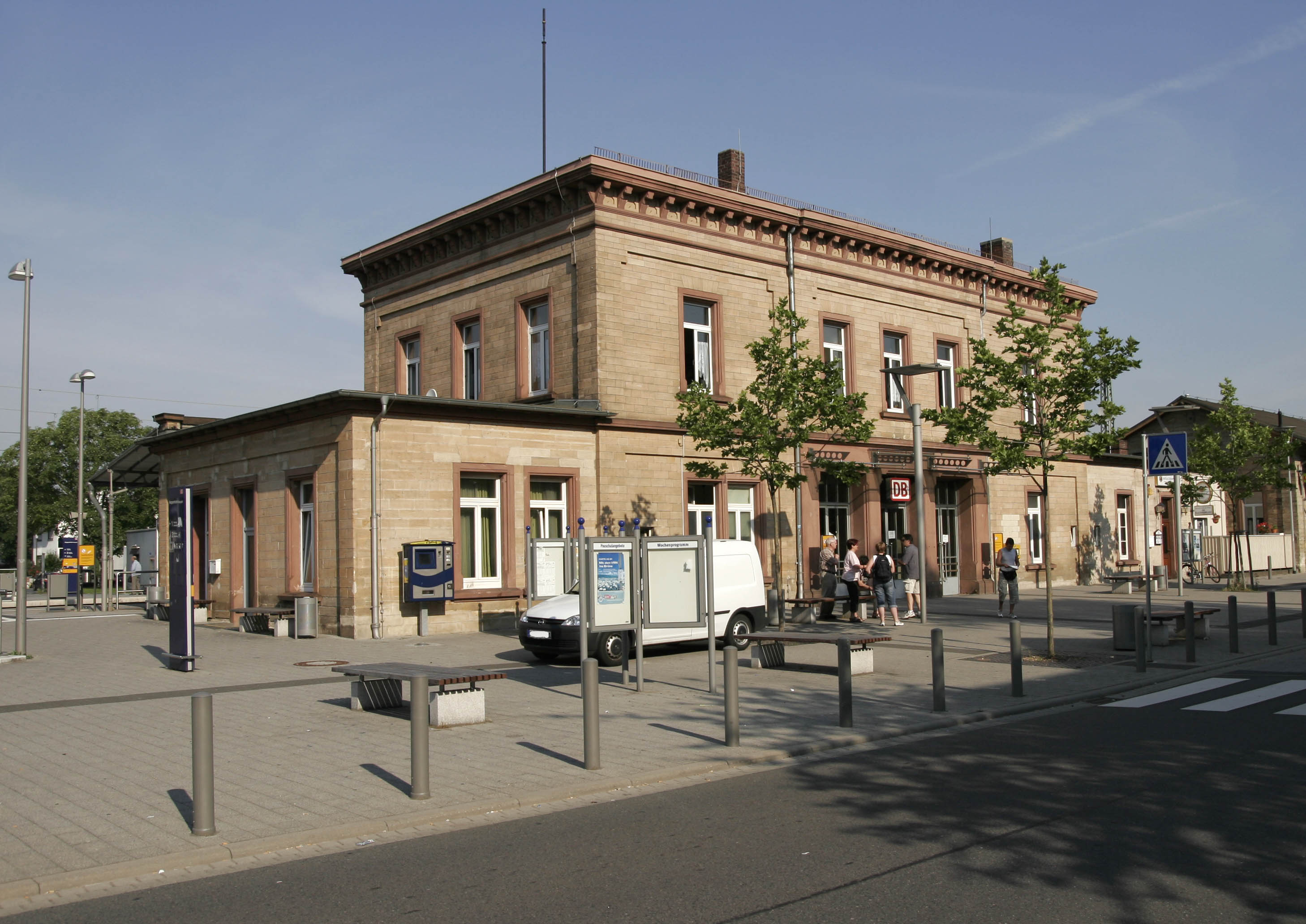
Heppenheim station

=== Reception Building ===
The station building was built between 1845 and 1846 after a design by Georg Moller in the neo-classical style on the town side, to the east of the line. The facade of the lower level of the two-story sandstone building is marked on the long side by five bays, the central group of three on the ground floor act as entrances to the vestibule. On the narrow sides of the building there are three bays. The whole length of the eaves of the flat hip roof are decorated with a volute frieze. On both sides of the main building there are approximately symmetrical, single storey extensions. The platform canopy in front of the entrance building is built as lattices on thin columns with small capitals, built in cast iron. The building is listed by the Hessian heritage office as an early railway station of outstanding historical significance.

Heppenheim station was modernised and equipped for the disabled in preparation for Hessentag (a festival devised to promote unity in the state of Hesse, which was created in 1945) in the summer of 2004.

=== Tracks ===
In the station area there are still a number of shunting and freight tracks, which connected to the premises of different companies, but they are now overgrown and were finally dismantled in mid-2015. At that time the entire overhead line was also replaced. Two platform tracks are available for passenger traffic.
