= Rhine-Neckar S-Bahn =

Backbone of the urban rail transport network of the Rhine Neckar Area

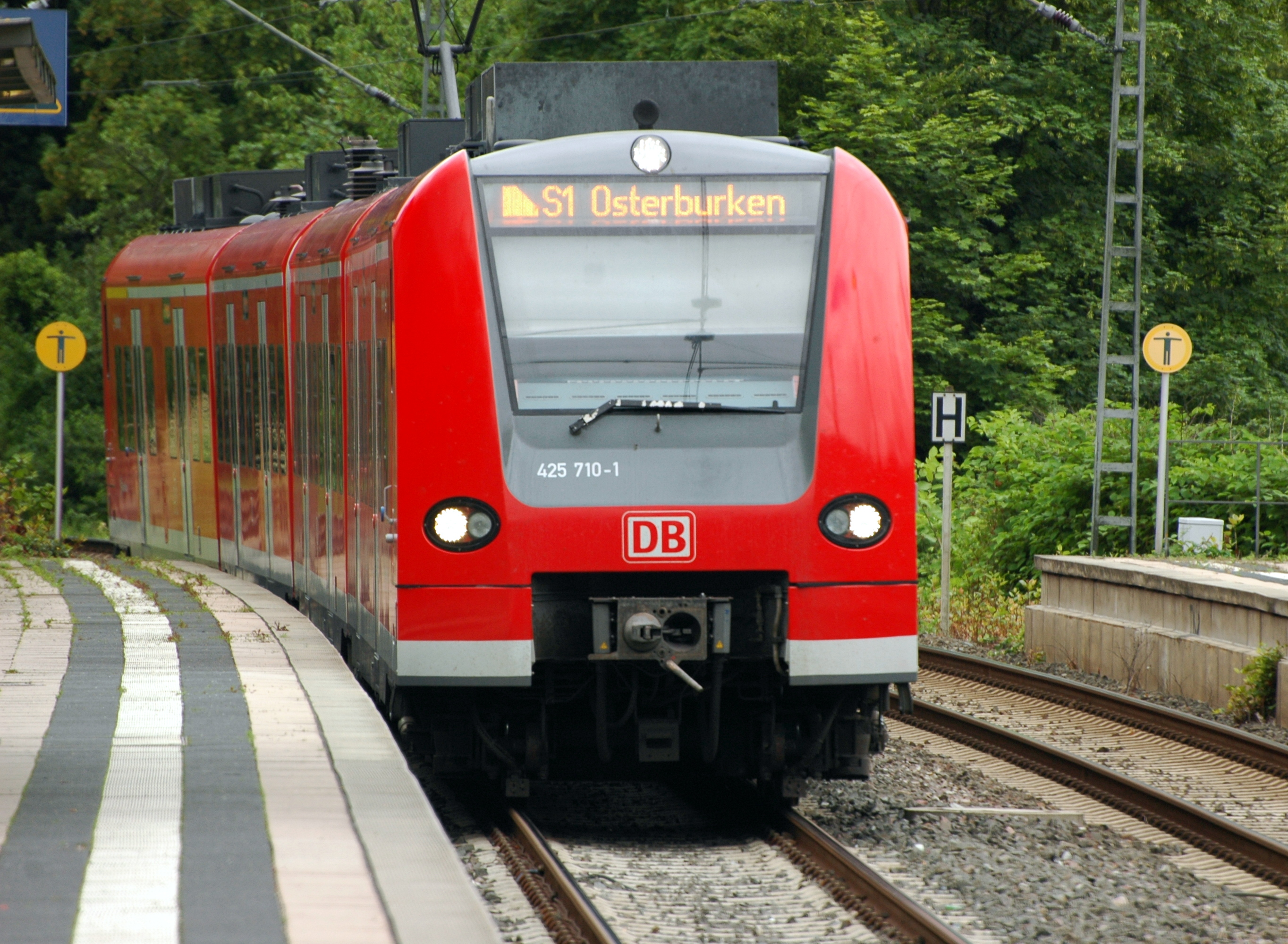
- Rhine-Neckar S-Bahn class 425 set in Heidelberg-Schlierbach/Ziegelhausen

Overview
- Native name: S-Bahn RheinNeckar
- Transit type: Commuter rail
- Number of lines: 13
- Number of stations: 120
- Daily ridership: 75,000
- Website: S-Bahn RheinNeckar

Operation
- Began operation: 14 December 2003

Technical
- System length: 603 km (375 mi)
- Track gauge: 1,435 mm (4 ft 8 1/2 in) standard gauge
- Electrification: 15 kV 16.7 Hz AC overhead

The Rhine-Neckar S-Bahn (S-Bahn RheinNeckar) forms the backbone of the urban rail transport network of the Rhine Neckar Area, including the cities of Mannheim, Heidelberg and Ludwigshafen.

The S-Bahn operates over 603 km (375 mi) of route in the states of Rhineland-Palatinate and Baden-Württemberg, and in small sections in Saarland and Hesse. S-Bahn trains operate about 7.5 million kilometres per year, with 113 stations served by class 425 electric multiple units.

== Network ==
The S-Bahn is about 603 km (375 mi) long and is one of the largest S-Bahn networks in Germany. The core area is in the states of Rhineland-Palatinate and Baden-Württemberg. At Homburg (Saar), it touches the Saarland and it has three stations in Hesse between Neckarsteinach and Hirschhorn. Four of the seven lines run together on the core Schifferstadt–Ludwigshafen–Mannheim–Heidelberg section. Beyond this main line, the S-Bahn operates over six lines with terminuses in Homburg, Osterburken, Karlsruhe, Germersheim, Bruchsal, Eppingen, Aglasterhausen, Mainz and Bensheim.

Services operate on weekdays at intervals of 30 or 60 minutes, except for the S7 and S8, which currently have only a few services. The lines are shared with the other passenger and freight traffic.

Line number	Route	Length	Stations	Railway lines
S1	Homburg (Saar) Hbf – Osterburken via Kaiserslautern Hbf – Neustadt (Weinstraße) Hbf – Schifferstadt – Ludwigshafen (Rhein) Hbf – Mannheim Hbf – Heidelberg Hbf – Neckargemünd – Eberbach – Mosbach (Baden) - Seckach	202 km	54	Mannheim–Saarbrücken, Rhine Valley Railway, Neckar Valley Railway, Neckarelz–Osterburken
S2	Kaiserslautern Hbf – Mosbach (Baden) via Neustadt (Weinstraße) Hbf – Schifferstadt – Ludwigshafen (Rhein) Hbf – Mannheim Hbf – Heidelberg Hbf – Neckargemünd – Eberbach	133 km	39	Mannheim–Saarbrücken, Rhine Valley Railway, Neckar Valley Railway, Neckarelz–Osterburken
S3	Karlsruhe Hbf <> Karlsruhe Hbf via Wörth (Rhein) – Rheinzabern – Bellheim – Germersheim – Speyer Hbf – Schifferstadt – Ludwigshafen (Rhein) Hbf – Mannheim Hbf – Heidelberg Hbf – Wiesloch-Walldorf – Bruchsal	104 km	29	Schifferstadt–Wörth, Mannheim–Saarbrücken, Rhine Valley Railway
S33	Bruchsal – Germersheim via Graben-Neudorf – Philippsburg	32 km	11	Bruhrain Railway
S39	Mannheim-Waldhof – Mannheim Hbf (– Karlsruhe Hbf) via Mannheim-Luzenberg - Mannheim Hbf (- Heidelberg Hbf - Wiesloch-Walldorf - Bruchsal - Karlsruhe-Durlach)	7 km (79 km)	3 (20)	Riedbahn, Rhine Valley Railway
S4	Germersheim – Bruchsal via Speyer Hbf - Schifferstadt - Ludwigshafen (Rhein) Hbf - Ludwigshafen (Rhein) Mitte - Mannheim Hbf - Heidelberg Hbf - Wiesloch-Walldorf	83 km	27	Wörth–Schifferstadt, Mannheim–Saarbrücken, Rhine Valley Railway
S4	Ludwigshafen (Rhein) BASF Nord – Germersheim via Speyer Hbf - Schifferstadt - Ludwigshafen (Rhein) Hbf - Ludwigshafen (Rhein) Mitte - Mannheim Hbf - Heidelberg Hbf - Wiesloch-Walldorf – Bruchsal	38 km	15	BASF works railway, Mannheim–Saarbrücken, Schifferstadt–Wörth
S44	Ludwigshafen (Rhein) BASF Nord – Ludwigshafen (Rhein) Hbf	5 km	4	BASF works railway
S5	Heidelberg Hbf – Eppingen via Neckargemünd – Meckesheim – Sinsheim (Elsenz)	43 km	19	Elsenz Valley Railway, Steinsfurt–Eppingen
S51	(Heidelberg Hbf –) Meckesheim – Aglasterhausen via Neckargemünd – Meckesheim – Waibstadt – Neckarbischofsheim Nord	39 km	14/16	Neckar Valley Railway, Elsenz Valley Railway, Meckesheim–Neckarelz
S6	Bensheim – Mainz Hbf via Heppenheim (Bergstr) – Weinheim (Bergstr) Hbf – Neu-Edingen/Friedrichsfeld – Mannheim Hbf – Ludwigshafen (Rhein) Hbf – Frankenthal Hbf – Worms Hbf – Mainz Hbf	108 km	31	Main-Neckar Railway, Rhine Valley Railway, Mainz–Ludwigshafen
S7	Mannheim Hbf – Bensheim via Neu-Edingen/Friedrichsfeld – Weinheim (Bergstr) Hbf – Heppenheim (Bergstr)		6	Main-Neckar Railway, Rhine Railway, Neu-Edingen/Mannheim–Friedrichsfeld–Schwetzingen railway, Main-Neckar Railway
S8	Mannheim Hbf – Biblis via Mannheim-Käfertal – Lampertheim	28 km	7	Mannheim–Frankfurt railway
S9	Karlsruhe Hbf – Groß-Rohrheim via Graben-Neudorf – Waghäusel – Hockenheim – Schwetzingen – Mannheim Hbf – Lampertheim – Biblis	89 km	23	Rhine Railway, Mannheim–Frankfurt railway

=== Operating pattern ===
All lines have a 60-minute basic frequency. As a result of largely overlapping alignments in the core area services run at half-hourly frequency. On the core line between Schifferstadt and Heidelberg four lines run, each at hourly intervals, but due to problems of coordination may not provide a pure 15-minute interval schedule. Ludwigshafen-Rheingönheim and Ludwigshafen-Mundenheim are not usually served by lines S1 and S3. Line S1 usually serves Mannheim Rangierbahnhof and Mannheim-Seckenheim. On Saturday afternoons and Sundays, S2 from Kaiserslautern terminates in Heidelberg and S4 runs only between Germersheim and Mannheim.

Although the lines run from 05:00 until 01:30, regular interval operations usually run only between about 08:00 and 21:00.

== History ==
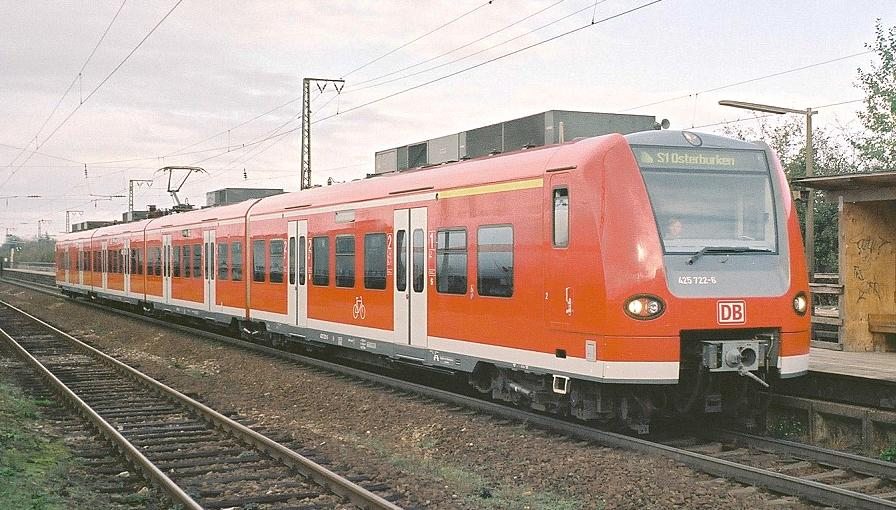
Line S1 S-Bahn train in the former Mannheim Rangierbahnhof station

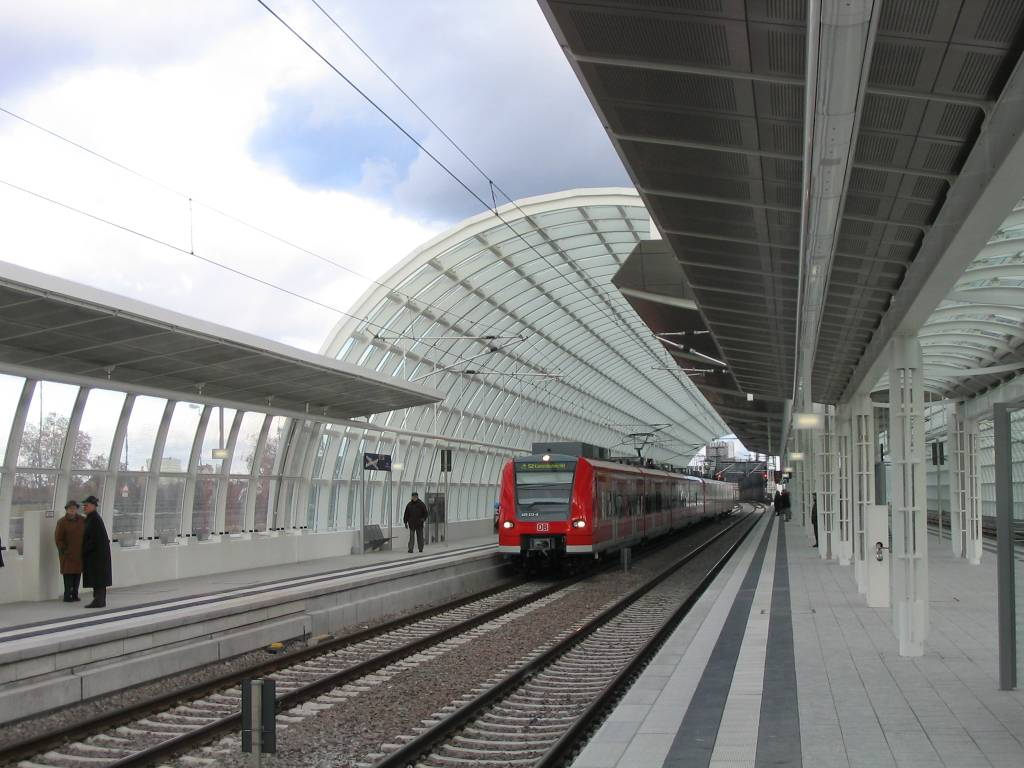
The Ludwigshafen-Mitte S-Bahn station

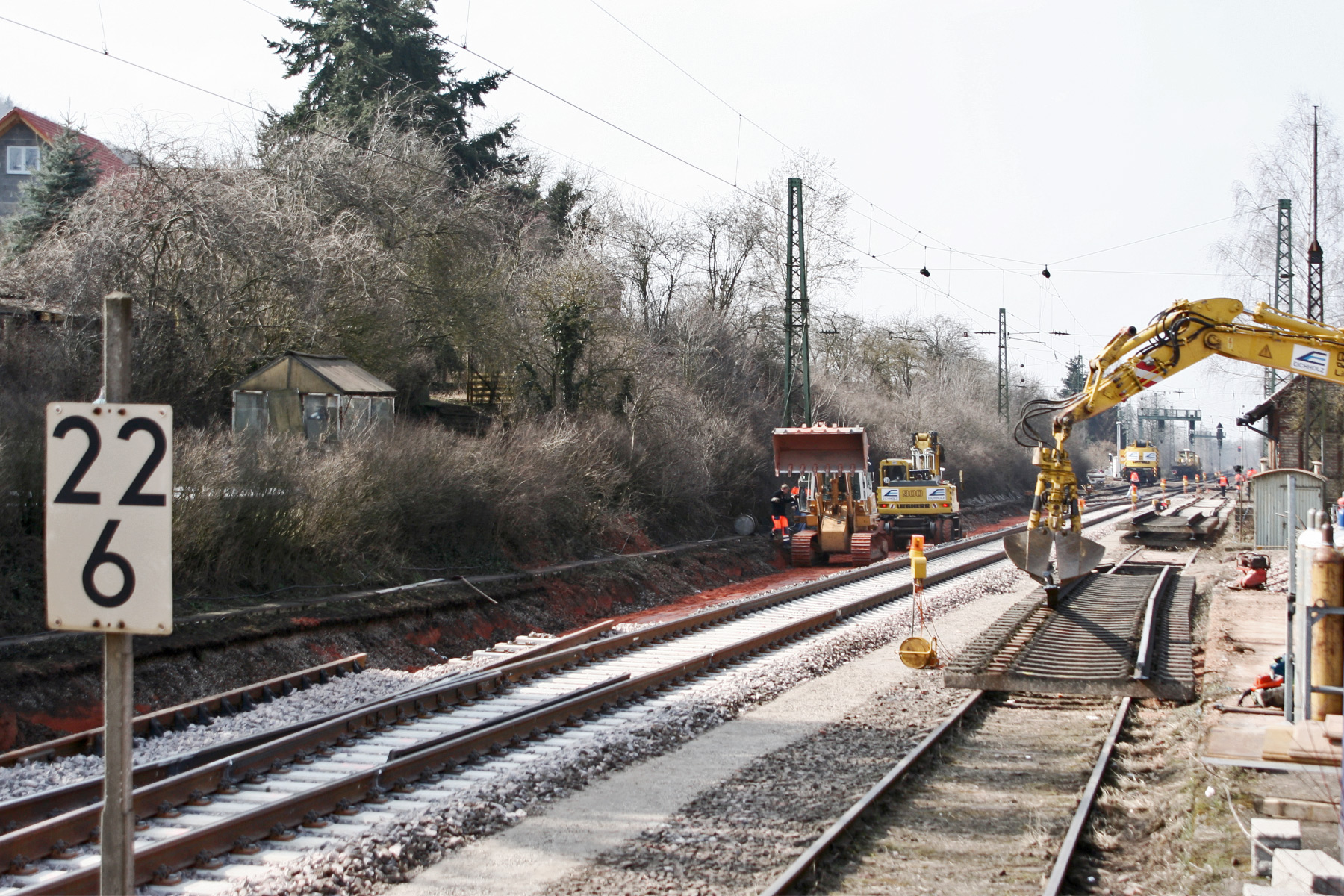
Construction between Kaiserslautern and Homburg

On 14 December 2003, the Rhine-Neckar area became the last large densely populated area in Germany with an S-Bahn system — planning had lasted over three decades and involved the cooperation of the states of Baden-Württemberg, Hesse and Rhineland-Palatinate. Following European-wide advertising for tenders, operation for 12 years from 2002 until 2015 was awarded to DB Regio.

=== First stage of development ===
Beginning in 2001, the lines and stations were prepared for S-Bahn operations. €260 million was invested for construction and €190 million for vehicles. An extra bridge was built over the Rhine between Mannheim and Ludwigshafen, urgently required to increase capacity, a by-pass of Schifferstadt for long-distance traffic and Ludwigshafen-Mitte S-Bahn station in Berliner Platz. A new S-Bahn workshop was established near Ludwigshafen Hauptbahnhof.

It was considered important to provide a large amount of uniform equipment at the stations. The platforms were raised to 760 mm (30 in) and made accessible by the disabled, partly via elevators. They received new platform equipment, such as waiting rooms and seating.

The platforms at Mannheim-Seckenheim, Mannheim-Rangierbahnhof, Ludwigshafen-Mundenheim and Ludwigshafen-Rheingönheim were raised temporarily using wooden planks, since no decision had been made on the final configuration of the track or the future position of the platforms.

==== Extension to Germersheim ====
The first stage was completed at the end of 2006 with the extension from Homburg to Kaiserslautern and the Mannheim-Speyer route to Germersheim. The Speyer route required electrification south of Schifferstadt and modification of three stations. A new station is under construction at Speyer Süd, but its opening has been delayed. A further extension from Germersheim to Graben-Neudorf to Bruchsal was opened in December 2011 and an extension of line S5 of the Karlsruhe Stadtbahn from Wörth am Rhein to Germersheim was opened in December 2010.

==== Extension to Homburg (Saar) ====
The upgrade of the Mannheim–Kaiserslautern line to Homburg was carried out as an urgent project in preparation for the 2006 FIFA World Cup. However, it was not finished in time and services commenced in December 2006. Only line S1 runs to Homburg; S2 continues to terminate in Kaiserslautern. The city of Homburg did not participate financially in this extension.

==== Heidelberg–Karlsruhe route ====
To the extent that they did not already meet this requirement, all stations on the Heidelberg–Karlsruhe route were extended to 140 m (150 yd) of platform length during the first expansion phase in order to enable S-Bahn trains to stop in double sets.

In addition, the further measures at the stations on the Heidelberg–Bruchsal section of the line are still considered to be part of the first expansion stage. At six stations, the platforms were extended to 210 m (230 yd) in order to be able to use S-Bahn trains in triple sets due to the expected traffic volume. On 15 December 2019, the new Stettfeld-Weiher station was also put into operation.

=== Second stage of expansion ===
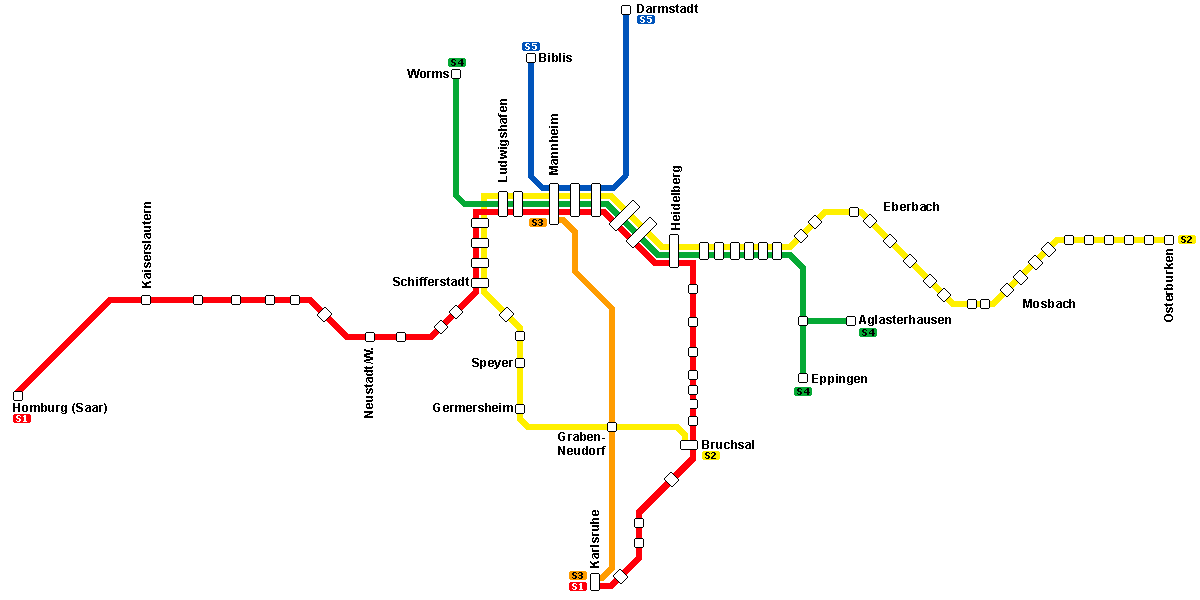
Original network plan for the 2010 Rhine-Neckar clock-face timetable from 2004

Shortly after the start of operation, a second stage of expansion was planned for the Rhine-Neckar S-Bahn to integrate previously unserved cities and regions into the S-Bahn network. However, the schedule laid down in the Realisierungsprogramm Rhein-Neckar-Takt 2010 (implementation program for the 2010 Rhine-Neckar clock-face timetable), which provided for further expansion to Homburg, Bruchsal, Karlsruhe, Eppingen, Darmstadt and Worms, between 2008 and 2010, was rejected again in 2006. The reasons for this were the reduction of funds made available under the federal Rail Regionalisation Act (Regionalisierungsgesetz) in accordance with the so-called "Koch-Steinbrück paper" as well as the need to finance infrastructure measures required for capacity increases in the north of the region, in particular the Frankfurt–Mannheim high-speed railway.

==== Heidelberg–Eppingen/Aglasterhausen ====
In November 2000, the Verkehrsforum 2000 proposed an extension to Eppingen for the first time. In August 2002, a "standardised assessment" for the electrification of all three routes to Aglasterhausen, Bad Friedrichshall-Jagstfeld and Eppingen showed a benefit-cost ratio of 3.7. The district administrator and former director of the Rhine-Neckar Metropolitan Region, Stefan Dallinger, stated that he was not aware of any project with such a good result. The board of the ZRN approved the modernisation in December 2003. The planning agreement was signed on 13 May 2004 and the construction and financing contract on 20 September 2007.

The project was to cost €81.5 million, of which €66.9 m was for eligible building costs, of which the federal government paid 60% and the state of Baden-Württemberg paid 20% under the Municipal Transport Financing Act (Gemeindeverkehrsfinanzierungsgesetz). The remaining costs were assumed by the municipalities and districts.

The modernisation of 78 kilometres of line covered 110 km (68 mi) of track and included the installation of about 1180 sets of overhead masts. On 10 October 2009, the overhead line was switched on.

Since December 2009, the new line S 5 has operated from Heidelberg Hbf on the Neckar Valley Railway and the Elsenz Valley Railway to Sinsheim or every hour on the Steinsfurt–Eppingen railway to Eppingen. Trains only occasionally stopped at the two Heidelberg halts of Schlierbach/Ziegelhausen and Orthopädie for scheduling reasons until December 2016 and only hourly after that. Line S 51 was opened in June 2010; this branches off in Meckesheim over the Meckesheim–Neckarelz railway and runs every hour to Aglasterhausen.

In Eppingen there is connection to line S 4 of the Karlsruhe Stadtbahn and the Heilbronn Stadtbahn. Since December 2014, with the integration of the eastern Elsenz Valley Railway in the northern branch of the Heilbronn Stadtbahn, there has also been a connection to Heilbronn in Sinsheim.

==== Extension from Germersheim to Bruchsal ====
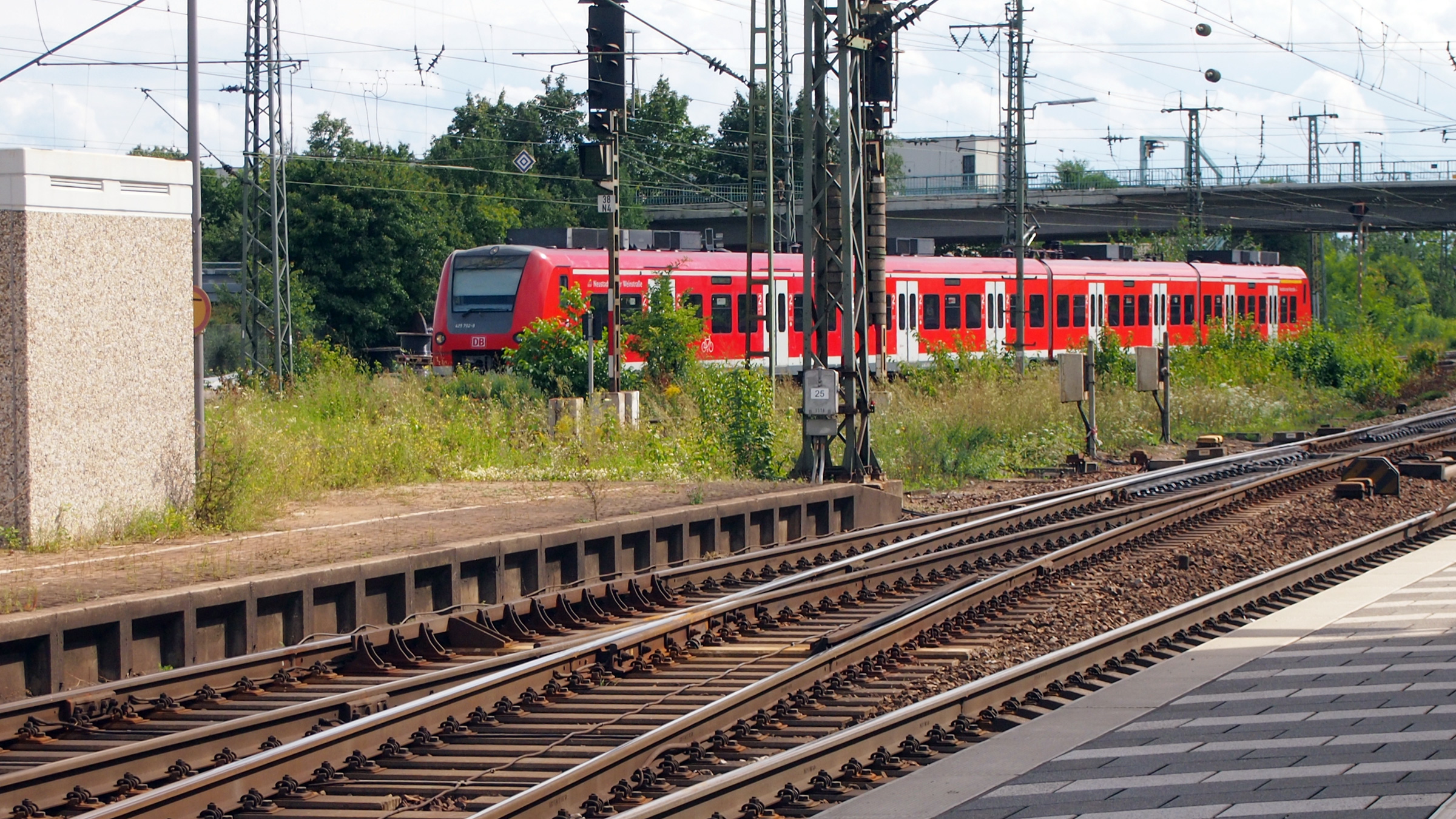
S 33 in Graben-Neudorf station

The second stage of expansion also included the integration of the Bruhrain Railway from Germersheim via Graben-Neudorf to Bruchsal into the S-Bahn network. This route was added to the S-Bahn network at the 2011/2012 timetable change on 11 December 2011 and is used by an extension of the S 4, but which is designated as the S 33 to avoid confusion with a line of the Karlsruhe Stadtbahn.

This required considerable modernisation and electrification between Graben-Neudorf and Germersheim. In addition, the three new stops of Germersheim Mitte/Rhein, Bruchsal Am Mantel and Bruchsal Sportzentrum were built. The upgrade of the line began in early July 2010 and lasted 17 months. The cost of the infrastructure work amounted to approximately €31.7 m. All stations were adapted for the disabled and made barrier-free. The only exception was the halt of Bruchsal Am Mantel, which had no ramps and lifts for part of 2012.

==== Mainz–Worms–Frankenthal–Ludwigshafen am Rhein–Mannheim ====
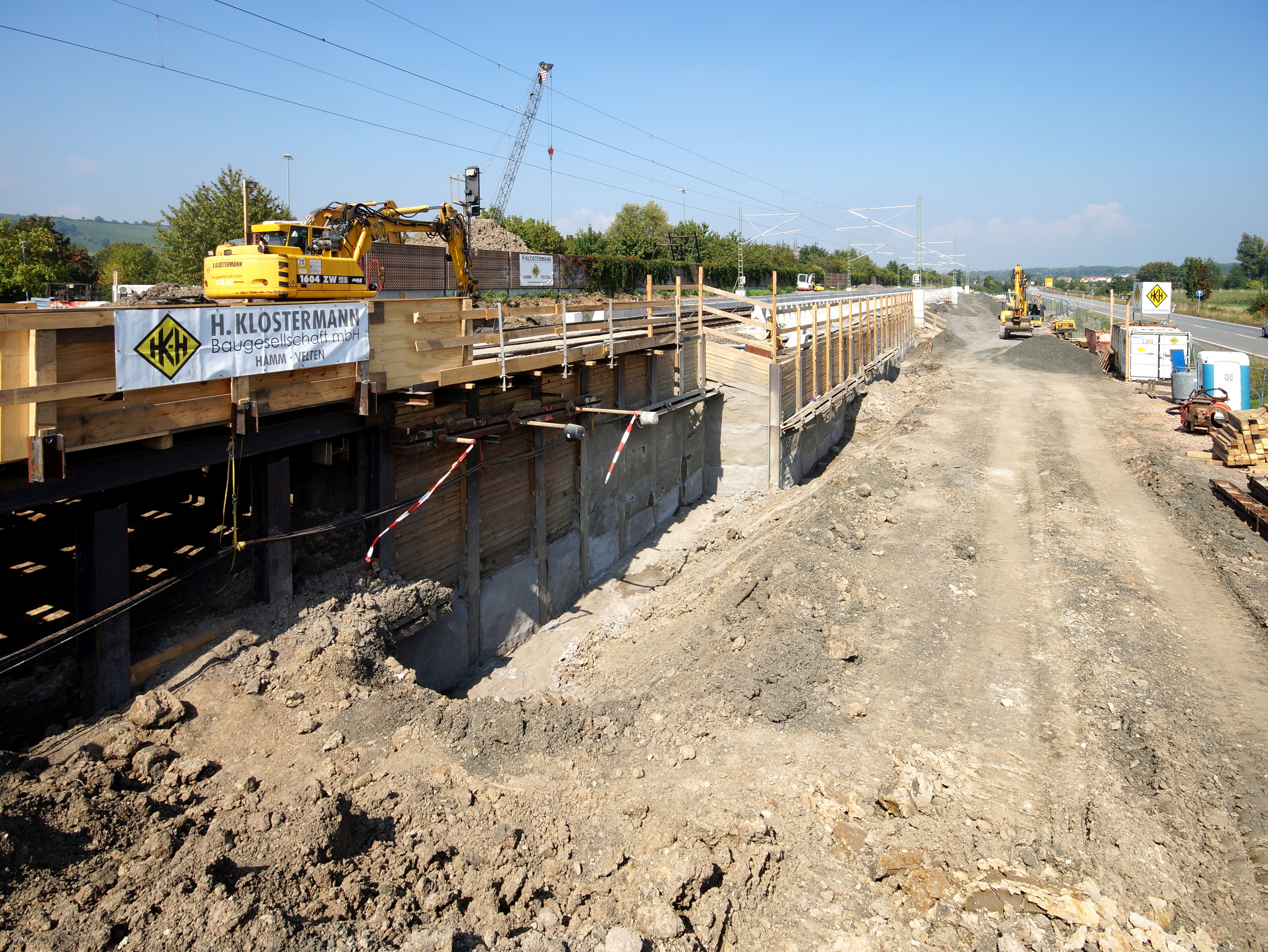
Construction of Dienheimer station in the summer of 2014

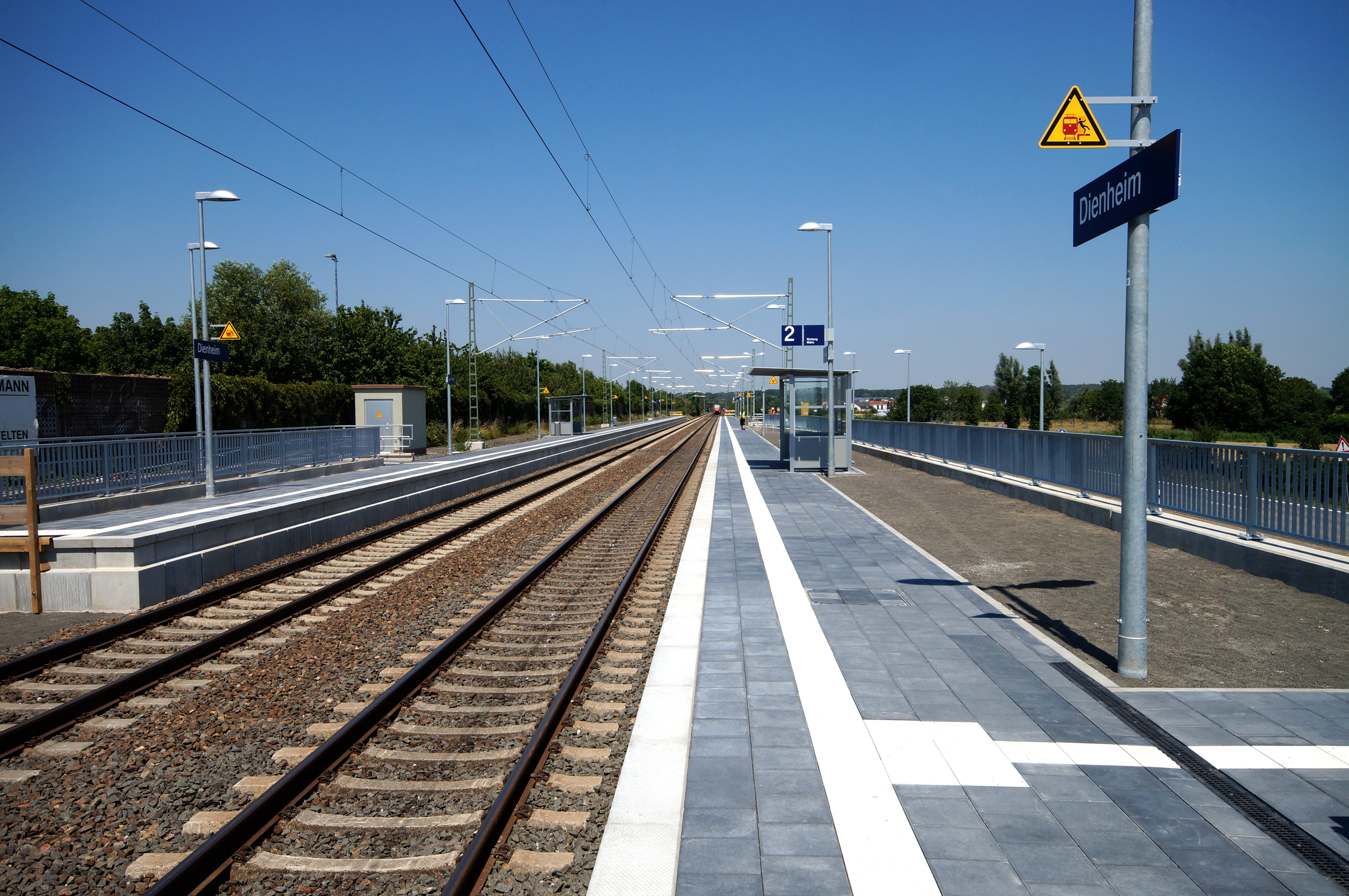
Dienheimer station on 2 July 2015, shortly after its commissioning on 14 June 2015

The Mainz–Ludwigshafen railway was integrated into the route of the new line S 6 at the minor timetable change on 10 June 2018. Early operations of S-Bahn trains using adapted class 425 stock were implemented on the Mainz–Worms–Frankenthal–Ludwigshafen am Rhein–Mannheim(–Weinheim–Bensheim) Regionalbahn route from the beginning of 2006. Line S 6 replaced the previous Regionalbahn RB 44 service.

In addition to the conversion of existing stations to make them compatible with S-Bahn operations, the new stations were opened in Dienheim and Frankenthal Süd at the timetable change on 14 June 2015. Construction began in 2012 and 2013 at Mainz Römisches Theater, Ludwigshafen-Oggersheim, Mettenheim and Bodenheim, and work at another ten stations was completed by June 2016. Mettenheim station was completed in September 2013. The planned establishment of stations in Roxheim and Worms Süd was abandoned as the responsible municipalities were unwilling to fund them.

==== Ludwigshafen Hbf–Ludwigshafen BASF Nord ====
BASF SE in Ludwigshafen and its three stops, BASF Nord, BASF Mitte and BASF Süd, have been served by the S-Bahn since December 2018. This required the line to be upgraded and electrified. Since then, it has been served by trains operating as line S 44.

==== Mannheim–Schwetzingen–Graben-Neudorf–Karlsruhe ====
The line running to the east of the Rhine on the Mannheim–Schwetzingen–Hockenheim–Waghäusel–Graben-Neudorf–Karlsruhe route (the Rhine Railway) has been operated as the S 9 line, connecting the Rhine Neckar and Karlsruhe S-Bahn networks, since December 2020. This line was initially to be referred to as “S 8”. Since there is already a line with this designation at Karlsruhe Hauptbahnhof, it was announced at the beginning of 2020 that the designation “S 9” would be used instead. This means that the entire route between Karlsruhe and Biblis will have a uniform line number (like RB 2 before it). New S-Bahn stations were opened in Hirschacker and Schwetzingen Nord in 2021 and Schwetzingen Nord station is expected to be opened by the end of 2025, but the proposed Graben-Neudorf Süd station is not currently considered compatible with the timetable.

The stations on the southern section between Graben-Neudorf and Karlsruhe were upgraded starting in 2011 and 2014 respectively. In the northern part of the line, the Neulußheim and Hockenheim stations already had the required platform lengths and heights, so only lifts had to be retrofitted. Work in Hockenheim and Schwetzingen was completed in March and July 2018 respectively. The platforms were rebuilt in Wiesental, Waghäusel and Oftersheim. However, the completion of the lift and the staircase roofing in Neulußheim was delayed until December 2019. Due to the special location and construction of the station, large-scale work could only be carried out with a blockade of the whole station.

Two compact stations were built in Mannheim-Rheinau and Mannheim-Neckarau, which allow a quick and barrier-free change to the trams and buses of the RNV. This work was finished in Mannheim-Rheinau at the end of April 2018, except for minor residual work, and the "compact station" was officially opened on 12 July 2019. In contrast, the case for building Neckarau station would be "examined in terms of the costs and benefits of the whole line", so it may not in fact be built. In the meantime, temporary platforms were built on tracks 1 and 2, which were completed in May 2020.

Construction work at the Schwetzingen-Hirschacker station began on 29 March 2021 and was completed in time for the timetable change in December 2022. The station has been in operation since then. At the end of July 2021, the new passenger underpass was inserted, which connects platforms 1 and 2.

==== Mannheim–Biblis–Groß-Rohrheim ====
On the Hessian side, the Riedbahn between Mannheim and Groß-Rohrheim was also integrated into the network of the Rhine Neckar S-Bahn as line S 9. The line was originally planned to run only as far as Biblis, but the Bergstraße (district) was able to have it extended with the fare boundary between the Verkehrsverbund Rhein-Neckar (VRN) and the Rhein-Main-Verkehrsverbund (RMV) moved to Groß-Rohrheim.

At the end of January 2016, the state of Hesse concluded an implementation and financial agreement with DB Station&Service under which the state of Hesse invested €5 million in the upgrade of five Hessian stations, Lampertheim, Bürstadt, Bobstadt, Biblis and Groß Rohrheim. In addition, affected municipalities participated through the Zweckverband Verkehrsverbund Rhein-Neckar and providied €8.2 m, while the federal government provided €11 m. Construction began on 7 July 2016 with a groundbreaking ceremony at Biblis station. Completion was planned by the end of 2017. The work in Bobstadt was completed in September 2017; Biblis and Lampertheim have been completely rebuilt since June 2019. Groß Rohrheim station was completed in October 2020 and Bürstadt station in July 2021.

The two stations in Mannheim that still need to be upgraded (Mannheim-Waldhof and Mannheim-Käfertal) and the new station in Mannheim-Neuostheim are scheduled to be built between 2021 and 2024. The trains running via Neuostheim and Käfertal have been running under the line name "S 8" since December 2022.

==== Mannheim Hauptbahnhof – platform F ====
In order to increase the capacity at Mannheim Hauptbahnhof and to avoid the problems caused by two trains stopping simultaneously at each end of the same platform track on platform tracks 7, 9 and 10, the new platform F, which faces tracks 11 and 12, was built from September 2014. This was built exclusively for local traffic. The future S-Bahn line S 8 (Mannheim–Schwetzingen–Waghäusel–Karlsruhe) will use it. It will also be used by RE 1 (Koblenz–Trier–Saarbrücken–Mannheim) and RE 14 (Mainz–Mannheim). In preparation, the freight train tracks had to be relaid closer to the B 36 first.

Track 12 was already in operation at the end of 2016, while track 11 was completed in August 2017. Since track 12 was already operating while the passenger underpass at the northern end of the platform had not been completed, a temporary solution had to be put in place by July 2017. Access to track 12 was therefore via track 10a and from there over a bridge to the new platform. However, track 10a had to be blocked for train traffic. Track 10b continued to be used, but only from the south.

=== Operations since 2016 ===
Following a call of tenders in December 2013, DB Regio was awarded the contract for lot 1 (S1, S2, S3, S4, S33) with approximately 8 million train-kilometres per year for the period from December 2016 to December 2033. The intervening year due to delays in the tender was covered by a transitional concession. The traffic continues to be operated with Class 425 multiple units upgraded for the purpose. In order to increase seating capacity, the rolling stock fleet is being expanded from 40 to 77 carriages, reaching 64 carriages in 2018 for the time being, achieved by adding six 425.3 sets acquired from Hannover. The package also includes push-pull trains to run to BASF from December 2017 and an improved service to Homburg from 2019. A quarter of the trains would be occupied by train attendants; in Rhineland-Palatinate this applies to all trains after 7 PM and half before.

Nahverkehrsgesellschaft Baden-Württemberg (Baden-Württemberg local transport company; NVBW) advertised lot 2, network 6b, by Europe-wide tender at the end of September 2015 after several delays. Originally, the tender was scheduled for early 2014. It includes operations on the line to Mainz and amounts to six million train-kilometres annually. The transfer of operations for a term of 15 years would take place at the end of 2020 and the line to Mainz would follow at the end of 2021. As with the tendering of operations of the Stuttgart RE network, this contract was based on an early 2015 law on the contracting of the provision of railway operations in Baden-Württemberg. In December 2016, the contracting authorities decided to postpone the transfer of railway operations until December 2020, as it could already be foreseen—even before the end of negotiations on the contract—that the required new rolling stock would otherwise not be available on time. On 20 June 2017, after none of the unsuccessful bidders had filed a petition for review, DB Regio was awarded the contract. The included lines (S5, S6, S8, S9) will be operated by new Siemens Mireo rolling stock. A corresponding contract for 57 three-part sets was signed between DB Regio AG and Siemens in August 2017.

== Further planning ==
The second stage of construction includes further projects that should have been implemented gradually by the end of 2017.

=== Development of the Rhine Valley Railway ===
Due to the high utilisation on the Rhine Valley line on the Bruchsal–Heidelberg section it is planned to extend the platforms from 140 to 210 metres, so that longer trains can run. This is necessary, above all, because it is not possible to increase the capacity of the line due to the joint use of the Rhine Valley Railway by local passenger, long-distance passenger and freight trains.

=== Planned operational concept ===
The Riedbahn, the Main-Neckar Railway and the Mannheim–Heidelberg line are at their capacity limits due to the high level of long-distance passenger, regional passenger and freight traffic. The connections and cycle times of the S-Bahn must therefore be based on the few remaining train paths on the routes, especially since the longed-for relief that would be provided by the planned Frankfurt–Mannheim high-speed railway has receded into the future.

According to the tenders, the originally planned "around the corner" connection of the two branches to Biblis and Bensheim in Mannheim was rejected as well as the connection from Mainz via Mannheim to Eppingen and Aglasterhausen. Previously, considerations of operating this service between Mannheim Hauptbahnhof and Heidelberg Hauptbahnhof as an express line without intervening stops had already been rejected.

Instead, the operating concept prescribed by the tender stipulates that the main line will be connected from Mainz via Worms and Mannheim to Bensheim, which was implemented in 2018. The Riedbahn line from Gross-Rohrheim, on the other hand, would end at Mannheim Hauptbahnhof, although it has now operates between Gross-Rohrheim, Mannheim and Karlsruhe.

== Rolling stock ==
=== Class 425 "Rhine-Neckar S-Bahn" sets ===
Rolling stock based on the second series of class 425 was used from the start of the Rhine-Neckar S-Bahn in 2002. These sets have a toilet and fewer entrance doors than class 423 sets. They have a floor height of 780 mm. Their folding steps allow a level crossing from the platform.

With the growing network of lines, additional rolling stock was required. Thus, starting in October 2015, 37 additional vehicles were rebuilt for Lot 1 of the Rhine-Neckar S-Bahn in addition to the 40 original S-Bahn trains (425.2), which had previously been mostly used for regional services in the Rhine-Neckar area. But rolling stock was also acquired from Hanover and North Rhine-Westphalia. In total, 77 vehicles (11x 425.0, 40x 425.2, 6x 425.3 and 20x 425.4) were converted during the first phase. A further 14 vehicles were converted in a second phase to April 2018, being first used on line S 6 to Mainz.

The vehicles, which originally had permanently installed steps, received folding steps as part of the rebuild. The seats in second class received new upholstery with leather headrests. In the first class, which consists of 12 seats at the end of car 1, the seats are completely covered with real leather. Poles were used to protect the windows in the multipurpose areas.

In addition, a new passenger information system was installed. 19-inch screens have been installed in the vehicles to provide up-to-date travel information and connection options. Surveillance cameras and USB charging points have been installed in all vehicles. All ticket machines have been removed from the vehicles.

=== Class 463 – Siemens Mireo ===
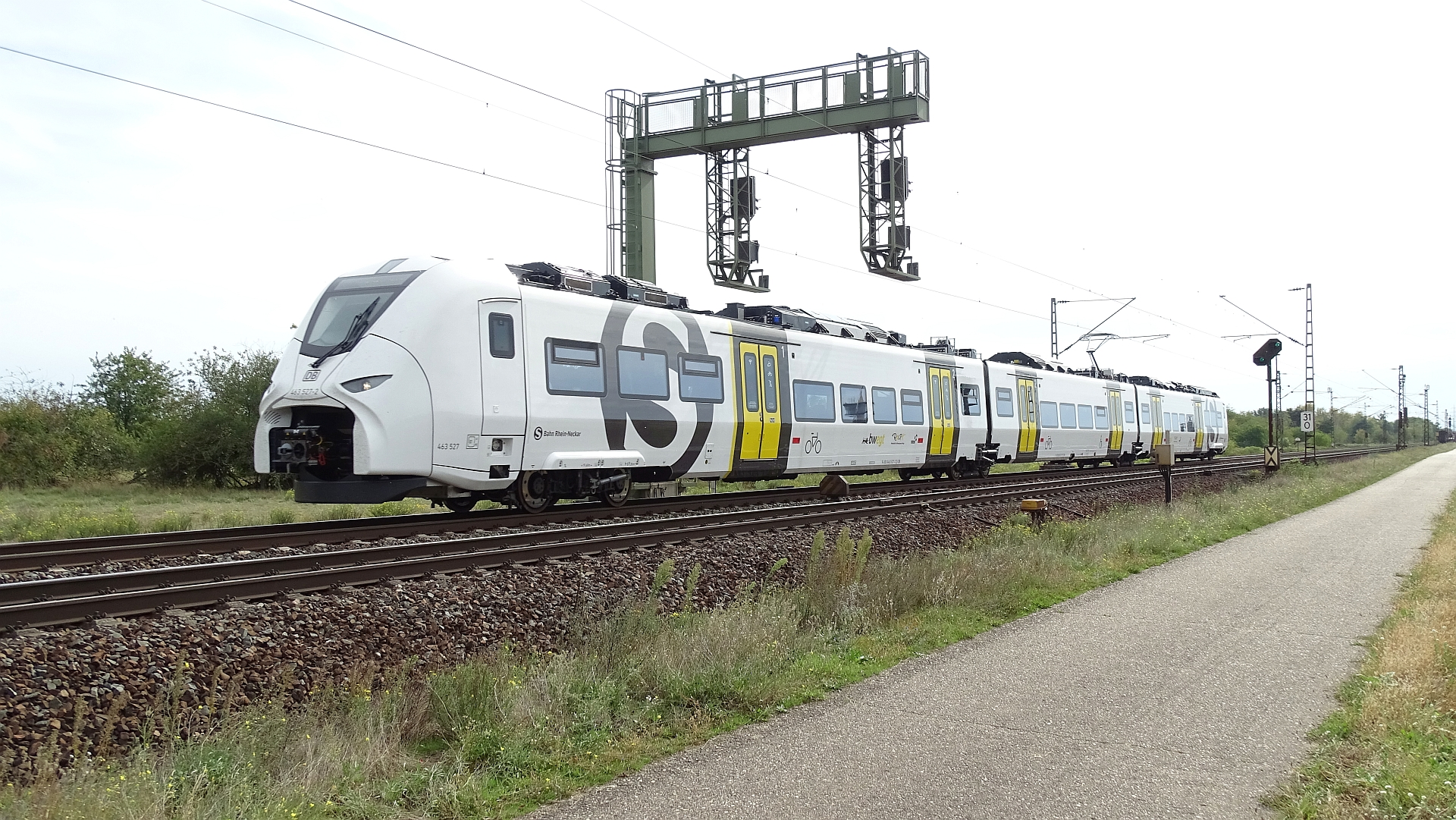
DB Class 463 Siemens Mireo in Waghäusel

For Lot 2, 57 three-part Siemens Mireo sets were ordered in August 2017. These will be used from December 2020 on the new S-Bahn lines.

The 70-meter-long sets have 200 seats, 26 bicycle parking spaces and free Wi-Fi for passengers. An integrated system to bridge gaps should allow people with reduced mobility to make a stepless entry and exit to 76 cm-high platforms without assistance. The exterior finish of the sets will not be Deutsche Bahn red, but light gray with dark grey sections in the door areas and a large S-Bahn logo. The yellow doors should stand out from the dark grey background.

=== List of names of railcars ===
The following electric multiple units have city sponsorships:

EMU	Name	Named since	Note
425 201-1	Mosbach	27 November 2006	
425 202-9	Neustadt an der Weinstraße	21 March 2007	
425 203-7	Wiesloch-Walldorf	24 June 2007	
425 204-5	Haßloch	7 June 2008	
425 205-2	Germersheim	27 August 2008	
425 206-0	Mannheim	13 December 2008	
425 207-8	Ludwigshafen am Rhein	13 December 2008	
425 208-6	Eberbach am Neckar	18 October 2009	
425 209-4	Speyer	27 March 2010	
425 210-2	Heidelberg	12 May 2010	
425 211-0	Bruchsal	16 October 2010	
425 212-8	Kaiserslautern	19 March 2011	
425 213-6	Sinsheim (Elsenz)	9 October 2011	
425 214-4	Seckach	21 July 2012	
425 215-1	Osterburken	13 October 2013	
425 216-9	Meckesheim	30 November 2013	
425 217-7	Schifferstadt	14 November 2016	
425 218-5	Homburg (Saar)	3 November 2016	
425 219-2	Bad Schönborn	1 December 2016	
425 220-1	Karlsruhe	13 March 2017	
425 222-7	Worms	25 May 2018	
425 223-5	Binau	7 April 2019	
425 319-1	Zweibrücken	11 October 2025	
