= Meckesheim =

- Municipality
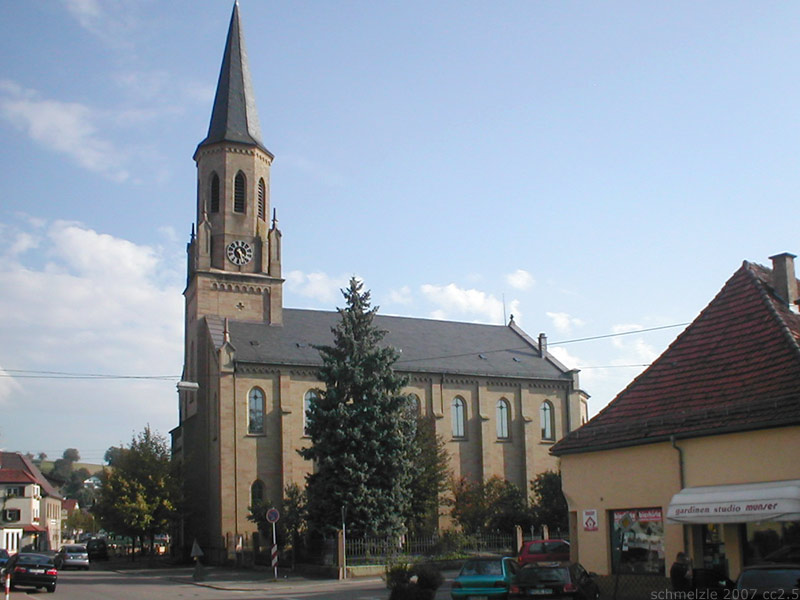
- Protestant Church

- Coat of arms

- Location of Meckesheim within Rhein-Neckar-Kreis district
- Interactive map of Meckesheim
- Location within Germany Location within Baden-Württemberg
- Coordinates: 49°19′17″N 08°48′55″E
- Country: Germany
- State: Baden-Württemberg
- Admin. region: Karlsruhe
- District: Rhein-Neckar-Kreis

Government
  - Mayor (2016–24): Maik Brandt

Area
  - Total: 16.33 km^{2} (6.31 sq mi)
- Elevation: 154 m (505 ft)

Population (2025-12-31)
  - Total: 5,356
  - Density: 328.0/km^{2} (849.5/sq mi)
- Time zone: UTC+01:00 (CET)
  - Summer (DST): UTC+02:00 (CEST)
- Postal codes: 74909
- Dialling codes: 06226
- Vehicle registration: HD
- Website: www.meckesheim.de

Meckesheim is a village in south western Germany. It is located between Heidelberg and Sinsheim in the Rhein-Neckar district in the state of Baden-Württemberg.

== History ==
In 772 and 822 Meckesheim was mentioned for the first times as Heim des Mechino (home of Mechino) or Mechinos Heim (Mechino's home) in the Codex of Lorsch. The Martin's Chappel which ruins are east of the village is one of the oldest churches in the region. Since 1330 Meckesheim and the villages around was a part of the Electorate of the Palatinate. After the end of this territory in 1803 the village became a part of Baden.

Since 2023, Meckesheim has a city partnership with Harrison, Ohio.

== Traffic (rail) ==
Meckesheim station is connected via the Badenese Odenwald line from Heidelberg (1862, northwestern of Meckesheim) to Mosbach (Baden) (eastwards, 1862) and Würzburg (completed 1866). In 1868, a branch to Bad Rappenau (southeast of Meckesheim, important for salt production in Baden) was added and in 1869 completed to Bad Friedrichshall, in this way there were now a direct connection to Stuttgart via Heilbronn, too. In 1902, a normal gauge minor railway westwards to Wiesloch-Walldorf on the Rhine Valley Railway was opened, but the Meckesheim–Schatthausen section closed in 1922. During World War II a bridge on the line eastbound was destroyed by retreating German troops, and in 1971 the line was shortened to Aglasterhausen.

Since 2009 and 2010, these two lines (Elsenz Valley Railway and Schwarzbach Valley Railway) have been incorporated into the Rhine-Neckar S-Bahn. Due to the branch of the Schwarzbach Valley Railway and significance use by passengers in the village, Meckesheim has also been a stop (since 1997) for the Regional-Express service between Mannheim, Heidelberg, and Heilbronn. In this way it is possible to reach Heidelberg Hauptbahnhof (distance 23 km = 13.75 miles) within 17 minutes.

As DB Netz (the organization owning the railway tracks) refused during planning of the S-Bahn to incorporate capacities for goods trains and (even, already existing) sidings; goods traffic ceased in the late 2000s.

== Population ==
View chart definition.
