= Mannheim-Waldhof station =

Railway station in Mannheim, Germany

Mannheim Waldhof
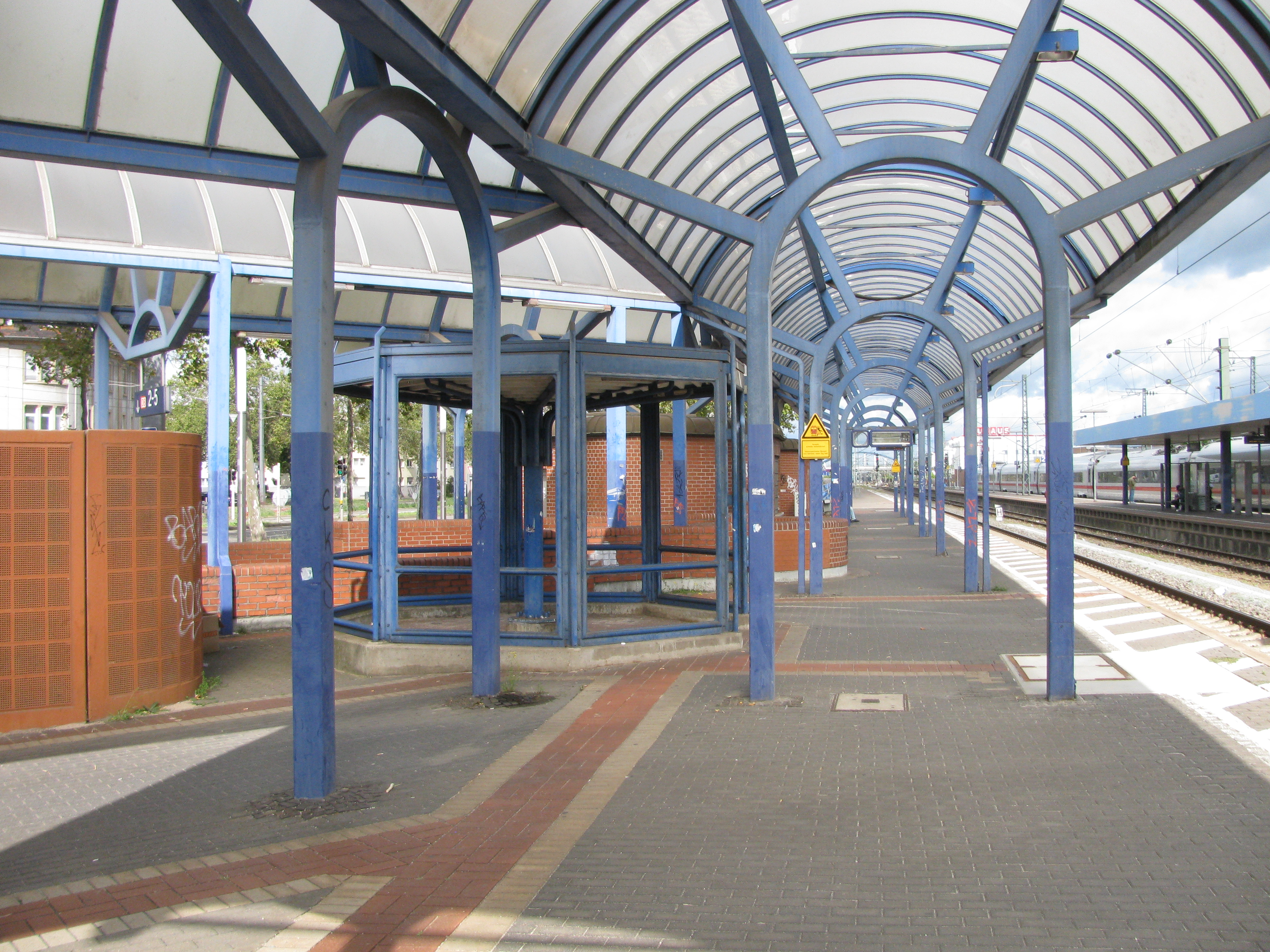

General information
- Location: Schienenstraße 2; 68305 Mannheim-Waldhof; Baden-Württemberg; Germany
- Coordinates: 49.5256°N 8.4824°E
- Owner: Deutsche Bahn
- Operator: DB Station&Service
- Lines: Mannheim–Frankfurt railway (KBS 655); WER (KBS 655)
- Platforms: 2 island platforms 1 side platform
- Tracks: 5
- Train operators: DB Regio Mitte
- Connections: RE 70; RB 2; 1; 45 50 55

Construction
- Parking: yes
- Cycle facilities: yes
- Accessible: partly

Other information
- Station code: 3936
- DS100 code: RMW
- IBNR: 8003848
- Category: 4
- Fare zone: VRN: 74
- Website: www.bahnhof.de

Services
Preceding station	DB Regio Mitte	Following station
Lampertheim towards Frankfurt (Main) Hbf	RE 70	Mannheim Hbf Terminus
Preceding station	Rhine-Neckar S-Bahn	Following station
Lampertheim towards Biblis	S8	Mannheim-Käfertal towards Mannheim Hbf
Lampertheim towards Groß‑Rohrheim	S9	Mannheim-Luzenberg towards Karlsruhe Hbf
Location

Mannheim-Waldhof station (German: Bahnhof Mannheim-Waldhof) is a railway station in the municipality of Mannheim, Baden-Württemberg, Germany.

== Notable places nearby ==
- Mannheim Harbour
