= Eppingen station =

Railway station in Germany

Eppingen
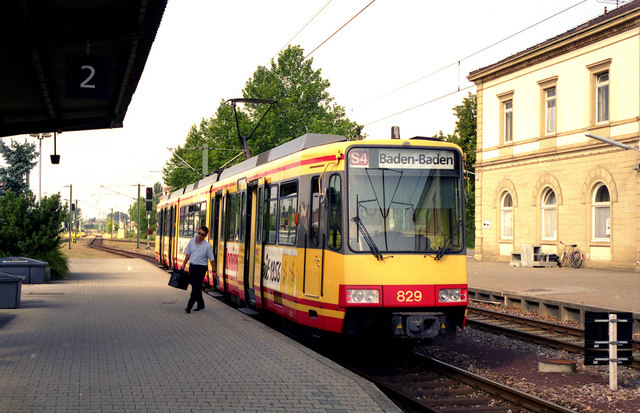
- A Stadtbahn set of the Albtal-Verkehrs-Gesellschaft on platform 2 in Eppingen station

General information
- Location: Eisenbahnstr. 40, 77855 Achern, Baden-Württemberg; Germany
- Coordinates: 49°08′10″N 8°54′52″E
- Lines: Kraichgau Railway (km 40.76); Steinsfurt–Eppingen (km 12.64)
- Tracks: 4

Construction
- Architect: Ludwig Diemer
- Architectural style: Renaissance revival

Other information
- Station code: n/a
- DS100 code: REP
- IBNR: 8000373
- Fare zone: HNV: 58; VRN: 217 (HNV transitional tariff); KVV: 278

History
- Opened: 1 June 1844

Services
Preceding station	DB Regio Mitte	Following station
Sulzfeld (Baden) towards Karlsruhe Hbf	RE 45	Gemmingen towards Heilbronn Hbf
Preceding station	Rhine-Neckar S-Bahn	Following station
Richen (b Eppingen) towards Heidelberg Hbf	S5	Terminus
Preceding station	Karlsruhe Stadtbahn	Following station
Eppingen West towards Karlsruhe Albtalbahnhof	S 4	Gemmingen West towards Öhringen-Cappel
Location

Eppingen station is the station of Eppingen in the German state of Baden-Württemberg. It is a junction station, where the so-called Kraichgau-Stromberg-Bahn ("Kraichgau-Stromberg railway", referring to two nearby regions), the Steinsfurt–Eppingen railway branches from the Kraichgau Railway (Kraichgaubahn, Heilbronn Eppingen–Karlsruhe railway). It is served by services on S4 line of the Karlsruhe Stadtbahn and the Heilbronn Stadtbahn on the one hand and services on the line S5 of the Rhine-Neckar S-Bahn on the other hand.

== Entrance building ==
The entrance building was built in 1879 according to plans of the Karlsruhe architect Ludwig Diemer in the Italian Renaissance Revival style. The building has belonged since 1 January 2013 to the town of Eppingen and is under heritage protection. It is being restored faithfully for the 2021 State Garden Show (Landesgartenschau), which is to be held in Eppingen. The station has been substantially restored since September 2013.

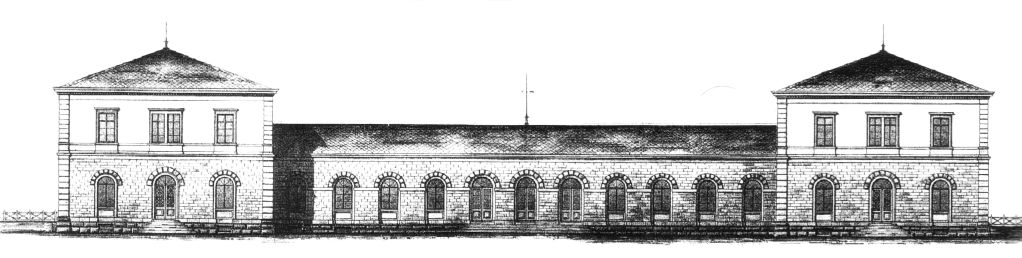
Elevation of entrance building at its opening in 1879
