= Kleiner Odenwald =

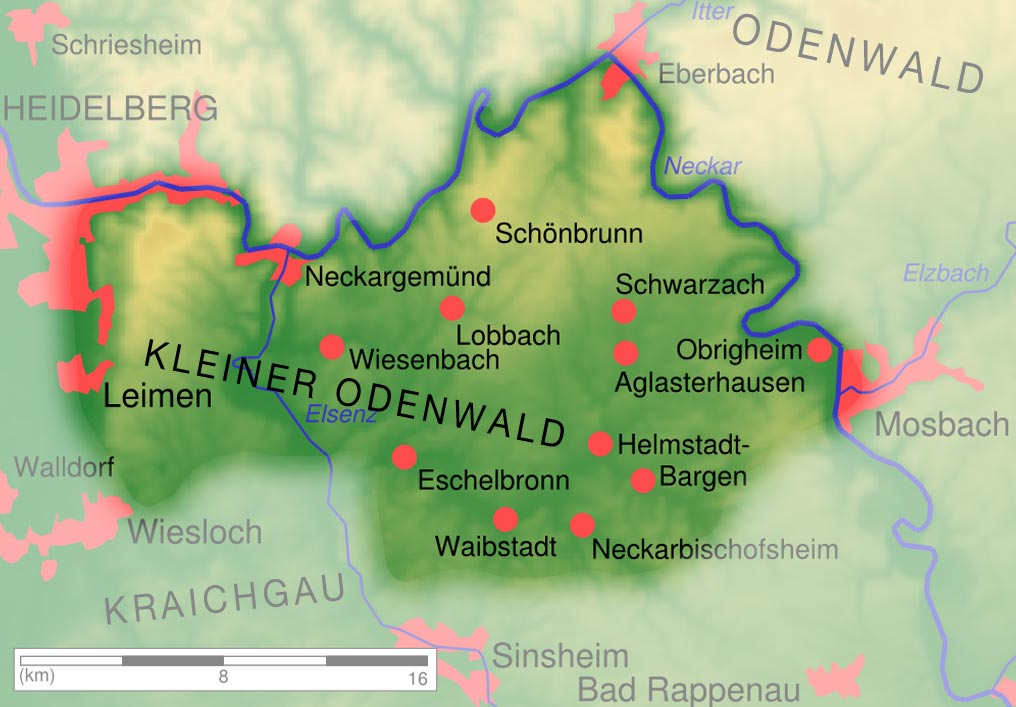

Highest point
- Peak: Königstuhl
- Elevation: 567.8 m above NHN

Geography
- Location within Baden-Württemberg
- Location: Landkreise Rhein-Neckar und Neckar-Odenwald und kreisfreie Stadt Heidelberg, Baden-Württemberg; Deutschland
- Range coordinates: 49°24′09″N 8°43′49″E

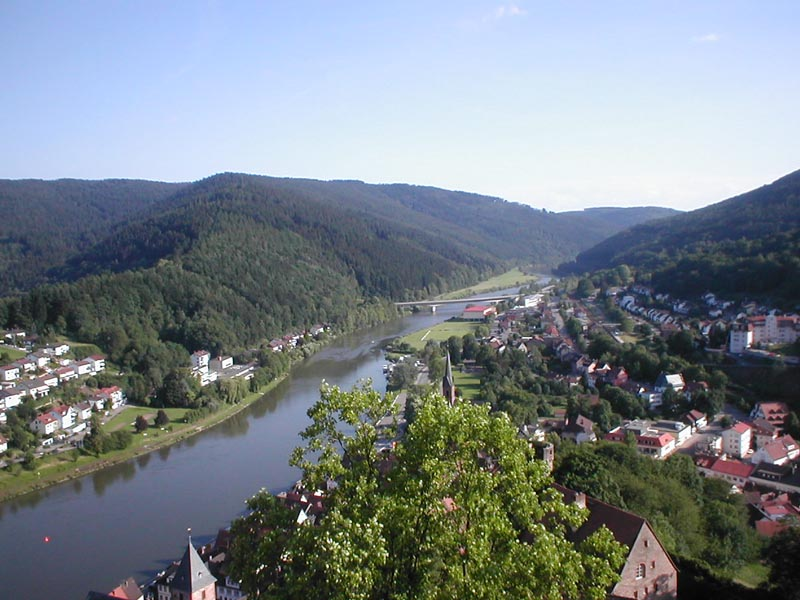
View from Hirschhorn Castle (Odenwald) of the Kleiner Odenwald on the far side of the River Neckar; with the Hirschhorn (r), Ersheim (l) and bridge of the B 37 (c)

The Kleiner Odenwald (“Little Odenwald”) is the southern part of the central German hill range, the Odenwald, and is up to 567.8 m above sea level (NHN). It is also part of the natural region of Sandstein-Odenwald in the north of the state of Baden-Württemberg. Lying east-southeast of Heidelberg and south of the River Neckar, which separates the Kleiner Odenwald from the rest of the Odenwald, its landscape is shaped by the underlying sandstone that also dominates the northern Odenwald.

== Geography ==
=== Location ===
The Kleiner Odenwald lies in the counties of Rhein-Neckar and Neckar-Odenwald and on the territory of the city of Heidelberg. It is bounded in the north by the Neckar and the settlements of Neckargemünd and Eberbach, in the east by the Neckar and e.g. by Obrigheim, in the south by Reichartshausen, Waibstadt and Eschelbronn and in the west by Wiesloch, Leimen and Heidelberg on the River Neckar. Municipalities in the area are: Lobbach, Bammental, Gaiberg, Wiesenbach, Aglasterhausen, Schwarzach, Neunkirchen and Schönbrunn. The most important streams are the Elsenz, Schwarzbach and Lobbach.

Somewhat east of the Kleiner Odenwaldes lies the Bauland, south of the Kraichgau and west of the Upper Rhine Plain. In the southeast is part of the Brunnen region.

=== Hills ===
The hills and high points of the Kleiner Odenwald include the following – sorted by height in metres (m) above Normalhöhennull (NHN):

- Königstuhl (567.8 m), east of Heidelberg
- Hebert (518.8 m), south of Eberbach-Neckarwimmersbach
- Auerhahnenkopf (486.9 m), south of Heidelberg-Schlierbach
- Hirschhornberg (461.6 m), northwest of Oberschönbrunn
- Kolben (on the Oberen Neckarberg; 408.9 m), north-northeast of Schönbrunn-Moosbrunn
- Gaisberg (375.6 m), east of Heidelberg
- Neckarberge (367.5 m), south of Mückenloch-Neckarhäuserhof
- Oberer Stadtwald (360.6 m), east of Neckargemünd
- Unterer Stadtwald (325.5 m), southwest of Neckargemünd
- Hirschberg (somewhat over 300 m), northeast of Nußloch
- Neckarriedkopf (293.8 m), southwest of Neckargemünd in the Unteren Stadtwald
- Hollmut (284.8 m), south of Neckargemünd
- Salzberg (259.3 m), west-southwest of Lobbach-Lobenfeld
- Bammertsberg (249.9 m), north of Bammental
