= List of subcamps of Natzweiler-Struthof =

The following is a list of subcamps of the Natzweiler-Struthof complex of Nazi concentration camps, and work kommandos from the main camp.

These subordinated camps were located on both sides of the German-French border. There were about 50 subcamps in the Natzweiler-Struthof camp system, located in Alsace and Lorraine as well as in the adjacent German provinces of Baden and Württemberg. By the fall of 1944, there were about 7,000 prisoners in the main camp and more than 20,000 in subcamps.

1. Asbach, today part of Obrigheim
2. Auerbach, today part of Bensheim
3. Bad Rappenau
4. Baden-Baden
5. Balingen
6. Bernhausen
7. Binau, seat of administration for subcamps in the area of Neckarelz, not a Concentration Camp
8. Bisingen
9. Bruttig-Treis (also called Treis-Bruttig), today Treis-Karden and Bruttig-Fankel, near Cochem
10. Calw
11. Cernay, Haut-Rhin
12. Colmar
13. Darmstadt
14. Daudenzell, today part of Aglasterhausen
15. Dautmergen
16. Echterdingen
17. Ellwangen
18. Erzingen, today part of Balingen
19. Frankfurt/Main, located within the Adler factory
20. Frommern, today part of Balingen
21. Geisenheim
22. Geislingen an der Steige
23. Fort Goeben within the city of Metz
24. Gross-Sachsenheim
25. Guttenbach, today part of Neckargerach, part of the administration moved into the town hall after they abandoned the main camp, not a Concentration Camp
26. Hailfingen-Tailfingen
27. Haslach
28. Heilbronn
29. Heppenheim
30. Hessenthal, today part of Schwäbisch Hall
31. Iffezheim
32. Kaisheim
33. Kochendorf
34. Leonberg, in the Engelberg Tunnel
35. Mosbach
36. Neckarbischofsheim
37. Neckarelz I and II
38. Neckargerach
39. Neckargartach, today part of Heilbronn
40. Neunkirchen
41. Oberehnheim, today Obernai
42. Oberschefflenz, today part of Schefflenz
43. Obrigheim
44. Offenburg
45. Peltre
46. Plattenwald, today part of Bad Friedrichshall
47. Rothau
48. Saint-Die
49. Sainte Marie aux Mines
50. Sandhofen
51. Schirmeck
52. Schömberg
53. Schörzingen, today part of Schömberg
54. Schwäbisch Hall
55. Schwarzacher Hof, today part of Schwarzach
56. Spaichingen
57. Thil
58. Unterriexingen, today part of Markgröningen
59. Wiesengrund at Vaihingen an der Enz
60. Walldorf, today part of Mörfelden-Walldorf
61. Wasseralfingen, today part of Aalen
62. Weckrieden, today part of Schwäbisch Hall
63. Wesserling, today Husseren-Wesserling
64. Zuffenhausen

== Literature ==
- Stegemann, Robert: Das Konzentrationslager Natzweiler-Struthof und seine Außenkommandos an Rhein und Neckar 1941–1945. Metropol, Berlin 2010, ISBN 978-3-940938-58-9.

== See also ==
- List of Nazi-German concentration camps
