= Fehrenbach =

Screenplay writer

Fehrenbach is a German locational surname, originating from German-language toponym Fehrenbach; first mentioned on 1244 as "Verinbach" in Baden-Württemberg. Notable people with the name include:

- Charles Fehrenbach (disambiguation), multiple people
- Constantin Fehrenbach (1852–1926), German politician
- Franz Fehrenbach (born 1949), German businessman
- T. R. Fehrenbach (1925–2013), American historian and writer

== See also ==
- 3433 Fehrenbach, main-belt asteroid
- Fahrenbach (disambiguation)
