= Zwingenberg =

Zwingenberg may refer to the following places in Germany:

- Zwingenberg (Baden)
- Zwingenberg, Hesse
- Zwingenberg Castle, Baden-Württemberg
