= Krebsbach (Schwarzbach) =

River in Germany

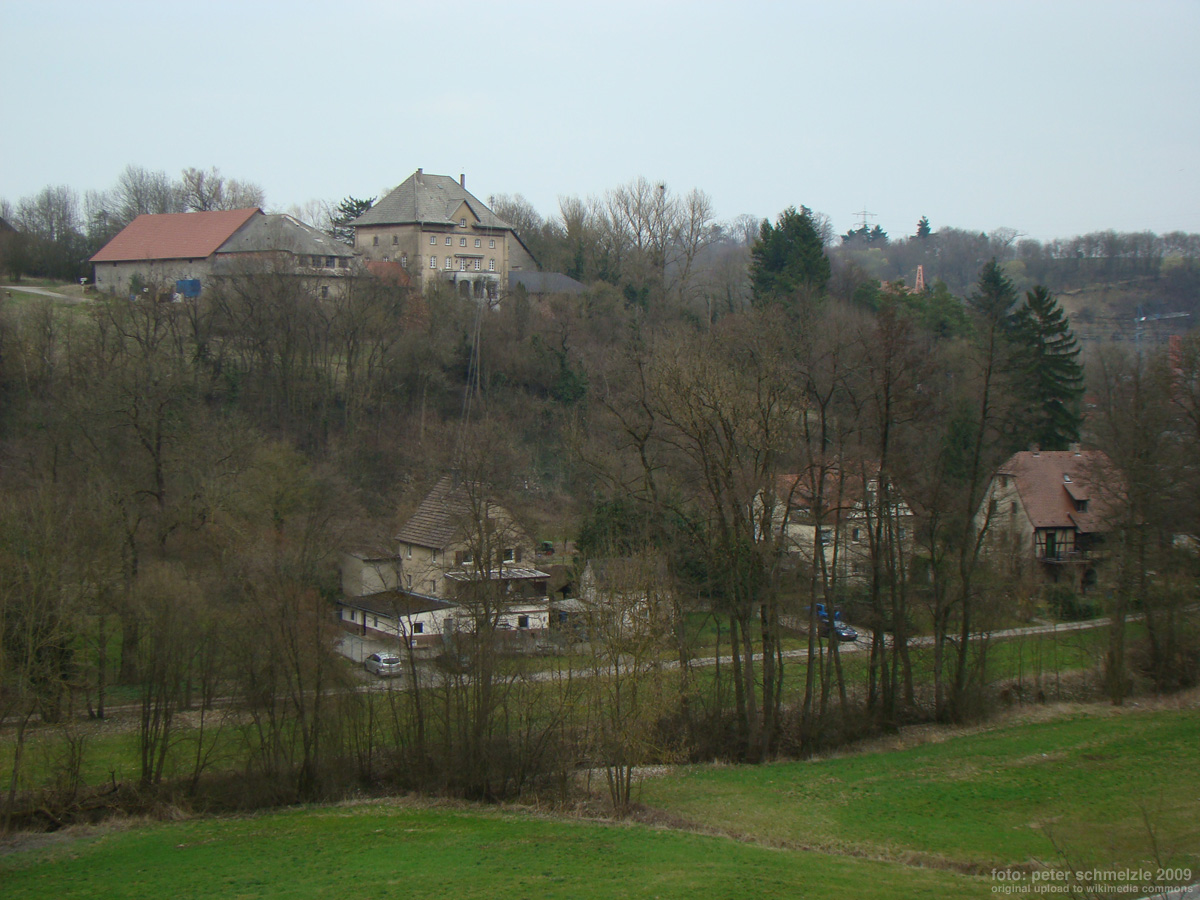

Location
- Country: Germany
- State: Baden-Württemberg

Physical characteristics
- Source
  - location: east from Bad Rappenau
  - coordinates: 49°15′30″N 9°4′15″E
  - elevation: cca. 113 metres (371 ft)
- Mouth
  - location: east of Waibstadt from left and southeast in Schwarzbach
  - coordinates: 49°17′59″N 8°55′15″E
  - elevation: cca. 165 metres (541 ft)
- Length: 12.9 km (8.0 mi)

Basin features
- Progression: Schwarzbach→ Elsenz→ Neckar→ Rhine→ North Sea

Krebsbach is a river in Baden-Württemberg, Germany. It is a left tributary of the Schwarzbach near Waibstadt.

== See also ==
- List of rivers of Baden-Württemberg
