= Balonia gens =

Ancient Roman family

The gens Balonia was an obscure plebeian family at ancient Rome. No members of this gens are mentioned in ancient writers, but a number are known from inscriptions.

== Origin ==
The nomen Balonius belongs to a class of gentilicia formed using the suffix -onius, originally applied to cognomina ending in -o, but later used as a regular gentile-forming suffix, without regard to the orthography of the root. These nomina tended to be of plebeian origin, and were frequently Oscan. Chase suggests that Balonius might be derived from the cognomen Bala, perhaps from Latin balare, "to bleat". The spelling Bellonius, found in a few inscriptions, suggests a possible derivation from Bellona, the goddess of war, although the two forms could also have developed independently.

== Praenomina ==
The main praenomina of the Balonii were Aulus, Gaius, and Marcus, all of which were common throughout Roman history. Other names used by this gens included Gnaeus and Lucius, which were also common, and Numerius, which was relatively uncommon, and much more distinctive.

== Members ==
This list includes abbreviated praenomina. For an explanation of this practice, see filiation.

- Balonia, mistress of the slave Philemon, along with Balonius, probably her brother, according to an inscription from Casilinum in Campania, dating to 98 BC.
- Balonius, master of the slave Philemon, along with Balonia, probably his sister, according to an inscription from Casilinum, dating to 98 BC.
- Aulus Balonius A. l. Diphilus, a freedman at Rome who gave a pot to Pamphilo some time in the late first century BC, or early first century AD.
- Gaius Balonius, one of the duumviri quinquennales at Furfana in Apulia, along with Quintus Appaeus, named in an inscription dating between 10 BC and AD 30.
- Bellonius Secundus, buried at the present site of Radovljica, formerly part of Pannonia Superior, in the first or second century.
- Balonius Marcellus, named in an inscription from Saguntum in Hispania Citerior, dating to the late first or early second century, along with Balonius Marcianus and Balonius Severus.
- Balonius Marcianus, named in a late first- or early second-century inscription from Saguntum, along with Balonius Marcellus and Balonius Severus.
- Balonius Severus, named in a late first- or early second-century inscription from Saguntum, along with Balonius Marcellus and Balonius marcianus.
- Marcus Ballonius M. f. Paullus, a native of Mutina in Cisalpine Gaul, was a soldier in the tenth cohort of the Praetorian Guard, in the century of Fronto. He was buried at Rome in the first half of the second century, aged thirty-six, having served for nine years.
- Balonia Helias, buried at Canusium in Apulia, in a second-century tomb dedicated by her brother, Balonius Priscus.
- Marcus Balonius M. l. Lariscus, a freedman employed as a lanarius, or wool-worker, and coactiliarius, or felt maker, who dedicated a second-century tomb at Rome to his wife, Balonia Livittiana.
- Balonius Priscus, dedicated a second-century tomb at Canusium to his sister, Balonia Helias.
- Lucius Bellonius Marcus, made an offering to Mercury at a shrine located at the present site of Obrigheim, formerly part of Germania Superior, dating to the latter half of the second century, or the first half of the third.
- Gaius Bolonius Maximus, buried at Emona in Pannonia Superior, in a tomb dedicated by his wife, Aurelia Bona, dating to the late second or early third century.
- Belonius, dedicated a fourth-century tomb at Rome for his wife, Othonia Felicissima.

=== Undated Balonii ===
- Balonia, buried at Casinum in Campania, together with Balonius Pudens.
- Aulus Balonius, mentioned in a fragmentary inscription from Rome, apparently concerning a freedman of his wife.
- Gaius Balonius, named in an inscription from Rome, giving the date as the Kalends of May.
- Balonia A. l. Chila, a freedwoman buried at Rome, along with Aulus Balonius Dio, Balonia Nice, and Quintus Roscius Philargurus.
- Numerius Balonius Dardanus, probably the freedman of Numerius Balonius Faustus, who built a sepulchre at Rome for Dardanus and Balonia Secunda, his freedwoman.
- Aulus Balonius A. l. Dio, a freedman buried at Rome, along with Balonia Chila, Balonia Nice, and Quintus Roscius Philargurus.
- Marcus Bullonius Euhodus, an officer in the Legio I Minervia, named in an inscription from Rome.
- Numerius Balonius Faustus, built a tomb at Rome for his freedwoman, Balonia Secunda, and Numerius Balonius Dardanus, probably his freedman.
- Balonia Liberalis, a young woman buried at Rome, aged twenty-two years, five months, and twenty-seven days, with a monument dedicated by her mother, Balonia Severa.
- Balonia Marcia, buried at Nemausus in Gallia Narbonensis.
- Balonia A. l. Nice, a freedwoman buried at Rome, along with Aulus Balonius Dio, Balonia Chila, and Quintus Roscius Philargurus.
- Balonia Philematio, buried at Casinum.
- Balonius Pudens, buried at Casinum, along with Balonia.
- Balonia N. l. Secunda, the freedwoman of Numerius Balonius Faustus, was buried at Rome, aged twenty-six, in a tomb built by her former master, along with Numerius Balonius Dardanus, probably the freedman of Faustus.
- Balonia Severa, dedicated a tomb at Rome to her daughter, Balonia Liberalis.
- Lucius Bullonius Severus, made an offering to a local divinity at Apta Julia in Gallia Narbonensis.
- Gnaeus Balonius Cn. l. Theogenes, a freedman buried at Rome, along with his fellow freedman, Publius Servilius Agatho, and Servilia Musa.

== See also ==
- List of Roman gentes

== Bibliography ==
- Theodor Mommsen et alii, Corpus Inscriptionum Latinarum (The Body of Latin Inscriptions, abbreviated CIL), Berlin-Brandenburgische Akademie der Wissenschaften (1853–present).
- Giovanni Battista de Rossi, Inscriptiones Christianae Urbis Romanae Septimo Saeculo Antiquiores (Christian Inscriptions from Rome of the First Seven Centuries, abbreviated ICUR), Vatican Library, Rome (1857–1861, 1888).
- René Cagnat et alii, L'Année épigraphique (The Year in Epigraphy, abbreviated AE), Presses Universitaires de France (1888–present).
- George Davis Chase, "The Origin of Roman Praenomina", in Harvard Studies in Classical Philology, vol. VIII, pp. 103–184 (1897).
- Viktor Hoffiller and Balduin Saria, Antike Inschriften aus Jugoslawien (Ancient Inscriptions from Yugoslavia, abbreviated AIJ), vol. 1: Noricum und Pannonia Superior, Zagreb (1938).
- Anna and Jaroslav Šašel, Inscriptiones Latinae quae in Iugoslavia inter annos MCMXL et MCMLX repertae et editae sunt (Inscriptions from Yugoslavia Found and Published between 1940 and 1960, abbreviated ILJug), Ljubljana (1963–1986).
