= Neckargerach-Waldbrunn =

- Gemeindeverwaltungsverband
- Location of Neckargerach-Waldbrunn within Neckar-Odenwald-Kreis district
- Interactive map of Neckargerach-Waldbrunn
- Location within Germany Location within Baden-Württemberg
- Coordinates: 49°24′N 9°04′E
- Country: Germany
- State: Baden-Württemberg
- Admin. region: Karlsruhe
- District: Neckar-Odenwald-Kreis
- Seat: Neckargerach
- Subdivisions: 4 municipalities

Area
  - Total: 69.15 km^{2} (26.70 sq mi)

Population (2025-12-31)
  - Total: 8,883
  - Density: 128.5/km^{2} (332.7/sq mi)
- Time zone: UTC+01:00 (CET)
  - Summer (DST): UTC+02:00 (CEST)

Neckargerach-Waldbrunn is a Gemeindeverwaltungsverband in the district Neckar-Odenwald-Kreis in Baden-Württemberg, Germany. The seat of the Gemeindeverwaltungsverband is in Neckargerach.

It consists of the following municipalities:

1. Binau
2. Neckargerach
3. Waldbrunn
4. Zwingenberg
