= Hüffenhardt =

- Municipality
- Coat of arms

- Location of Hüffenhardt within Neckar-Odenwald-Kreis district
- Interactive map of Hüffenhardt
- Location within Germany Location within Baden-Württemberg
- Coordinates: 49°17′27″N 9°4′53″E
- Country: Germany
- State: Baden-Württemberg
- Admin. region: Karlsruhe
- District: Neckar-Odenwald-Kreis
- Subdivisions: 2

Government
  - Mayor (2018–26): Walter Neff (SPD)

Area
  - Total: 17.62 km^{2} (6.80 sq mi)
- Elevation: 292 m (958 ft)

Population (2025-12-31)
  - Total: 2,062
  - Density: 117.0/km^{2} (303.1/sq mi)
- Time zone: UTC+01:00 (CET)
  - Summer (DST): UTC+02:00 (CEST)
- Postal codes: 74928
- Dialling codes: 06268
- Vehicle registration: MOS, BCH
- Website: www.hueffenhardt.de

Hüffenhardt is a town in the district of Neckar-Odenwald-Kreis, in Baden-Württemberg, Germany.

== Administration ==
The municipality consists of two subdivisions:

- Hüffenhardt, population 1536 (2008)
- Kälbertshausen, population 533 (2008)
