= Paul Steiner =

German footballer (born 1957)

Personal information
- Date of birth: 23 January 1957 (age 69)
- Place of birth: Waldbrunn, West Germany
- Height: 1.82 m (6 ft 0 in)
- Position: Centre back

Youth career
- –1975: TSV Strümpfelbrunn

Senior career*
| Years | Team | Apps | (Gls) |
| 1975–1979 | Waldhof Mannheim | 144 | (16) |
| 1979–1981 | MSV Duisburg | 58 | (7) |
| 1981–1991 | 1. FC Köln | 291 | (20) |
| Total | | 493 | (43) |

International career
| 1983 | West Germany U21 | 2 | (1) |
| 1987 | West Germany Olympic | 2 | (0) |
| 1990 | West Germany | 1 | (0) |
Medal record
1. FC Köln
| Winner | DFB-Pokal | 1983 |
| Runner-up | UEFA Cup | 1986 |
| Runner-up | DFB-Pokal | 1991 |
West Germany
| Winner | FIFA World Cup | 1990 |
- * Club domestic league appearances and goals

Paul Steiner (born 23 January 1957) is a German retired professional footballer who played mainly as a central defender.

== Club career ==
Born in Waldbrunn, Baden-Württemberg, Steiner began playing football in his hometown with TSV Strümpfelbrunn. He started his professional career in 1975, going on to spend four seasons in the second division with SV Waldhof Mannheim.

Steiner appeared in 349 games in the Bundesliga, scoring 27 times from 1979 until 1991 with MSV Duisburg and 1. FC Köln. With the latter side, he was instrumental in five league finishes in the top three, also winning the German Cup in 1983 and losing the 1985–86 UEFA Cup to Real Madrid.

After retiring at 34, Steiner later worked as a scout for Köln's Rhine rival, Bayer 04 Leverkusen, before taking up the same role back at the former club.

== International career ==
Steiner was one of the oldest debutants in the Germany national team, when he appeared as a 33-year-old substitute in the final friendly match ahead of the 1990 FIFA World Cup in Italy, against Denmark at Gelsenkirchen's Parkstadion on 30 May. He was surprisingly selected for the World Cup squad in favour of Bayer Uerdingen's Holger Fach, who had been the expected pick of coach Franz Beckenbauer as Klaus Augenthaler's understudy.

Steiner was not recalled again after the tournament, where Germany defeated Argentina in the final and he did not play a single minute.

== Personal life ==
Steiner was commonly quoted in Germany as stating in a talk show that homosexuals were "too soft" for playing football.
