= Zwingenberg (Baden) =

German municipality

- Municipality
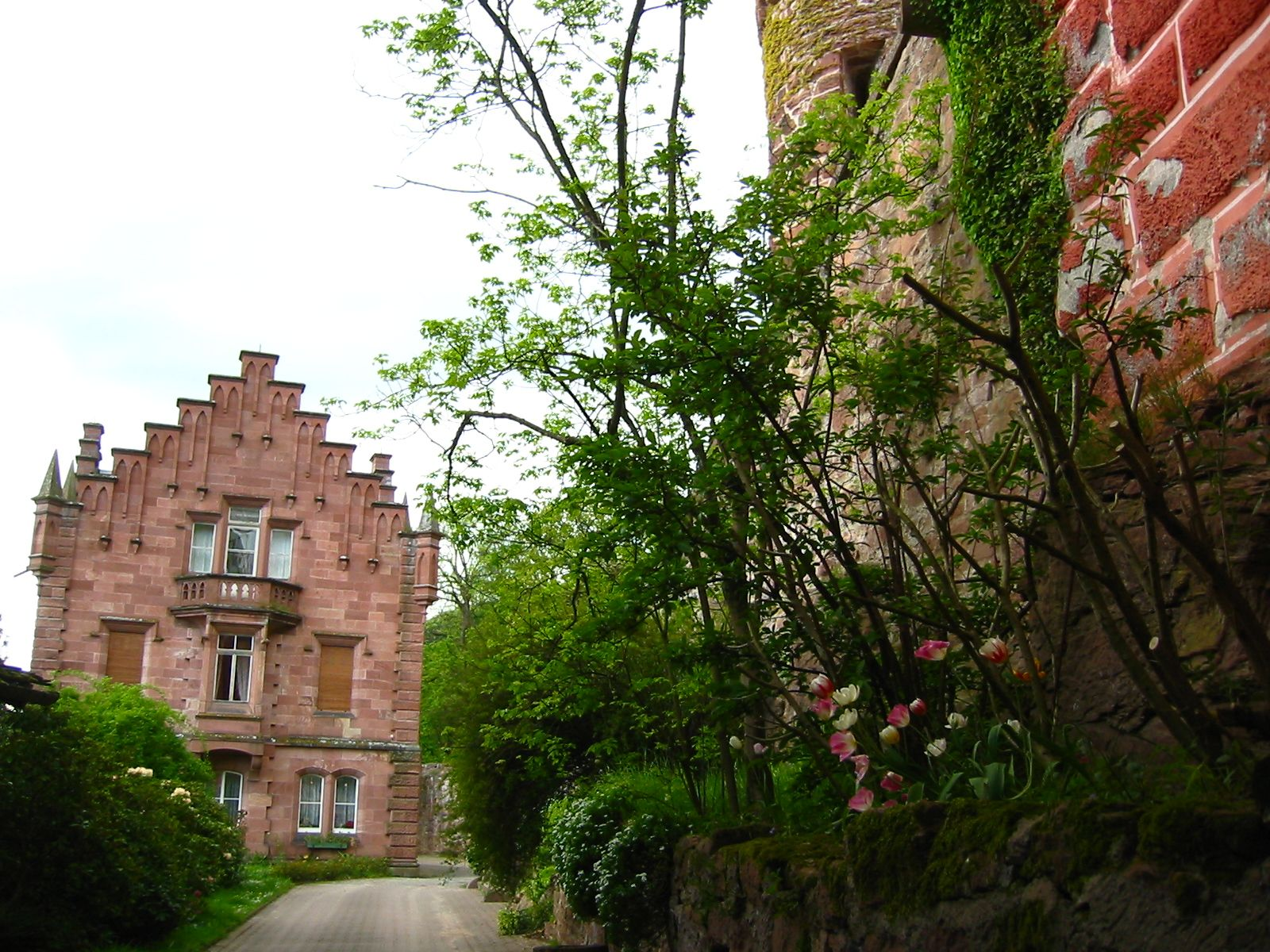
- Zwingenberg, May 2008

- Coat of arms

- Location of Zwingenberg within Neckar-Odenwald-Kreis district
- Interactive map of Zwingenberg
- Location within Germany Location within Baden-Württemberg
- Coordinates: 49°24′55″N 9°2′35″E
- Country: Germany
- State: Baden-Württemberg
- Admin. region: Karlsruhe
- District: Neckar-Odenwald-Kreis
- Municipal assoc.: Neckargerach-Waldbrunn

Area
  - Total: 4.7 km^{2} (1.8 sq mi)
- Elevation: 148 m (486 ft)

Population (2025-12-31)
  - Total: 620
  - Density: 130/km^{2} (340/sq mi)
- Time zone: UTC+01:00 (CET)
  - Summer (DST): UTC+02:00 (CEST)
- Postal codes: 69439
- Dialling codes: 06263
- Vehicle registration: MOS, BCH
- Website: www.zwingenberg-neckar.de

Zwingenberg (German pronunciation: [ˈtsvɪŋənˌbɛʁk]; South Franconian: Zwingeberg) is a village in the Neckar-Odenwald district, in Baden-Württemberg, Germany.

== History ==
Zwingenberg developed in the valley of the Neckar, below Zwingenberg Castle, as a possession of the Electoral Palatinate ruled via Oberamt Mosbach. In 1803, Zwingenberg became a possession of the Principality of Leiningen, which was mediatized to the Grand Duchy of Baden in 1806. Zwingenberg was assigned to the district of Eberbach in 1813.

== Geography ==
The municipality (Gemeinde) of Zwingenberg covers 4.7 square kilometers (1.8 sq mi) of the Neckar-Odenwald district of Baden-Württemberg, one of the 16 States of the Federal Republic of Germany. Zwingenberg is physically located in the valley of the Neckar, which has cut itself deep into the local sandstone. Elevation above sea level in the municipal area varies wildly, from a high of 424 meters (1,391 ft) Normalnull (NN) to a low of 128 meters (420 ft) NN where the Neckar flows out of the municipality.

The Federally protected Zwerrenberg nature reserve lies within the municipal areas of Zwingenberg and Neuenkirchen.

== Politics ==
Zwingenberg has one borough (Ortseil), Zwingenberg, and two villages, Burg Zwingenberg and Zwingenberger Hof.

=== Coat of arms ===
Zwingenberg's coat of arms displays three swan's heads, in white with yellow bills, upon a field of blue. This was the coat of arms of the House of Zwingenberg, which began to see local official use again in 19th century town seals. The Karlsruhe General State Archives redesigned these seals into a coat of arms for Zwingenberg in 1913 and it was subsequently adopted by the municipal council.
