= Höpfingen =

- Municipality
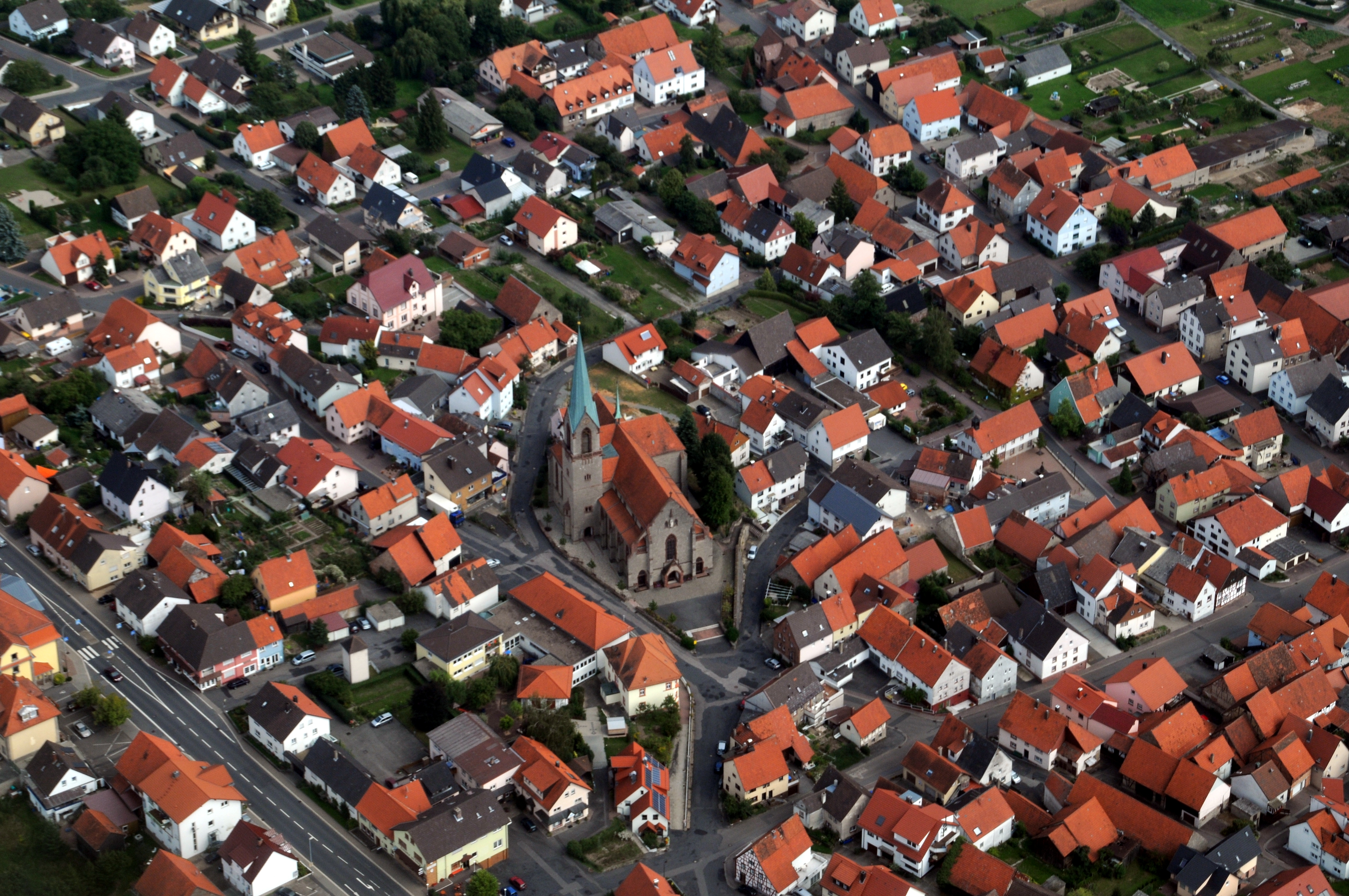
- Aerial view of St. Ägidius Church and surrounding area in the Höpfingen subdivision

- Coat of arms

- Location of Höpfingen within Neckar-Odenwald-Kreis district
- Interactive map of Höpfingen
- Location within Germany Location within Baden-Württemberg
- Coordinates: 49°36′5″N 9°25′51″E
- Country: Germany
- State: Baden-Württemberg
- Admin. region: Karlsruhe
- District: Neckar-Odenwald-Kreis
- Subdivisions: 2

Government
  - Mayor (2021–29): Christian Hauck

Area
  - Total: 30.49 km^{2} (11.77 sq mi)
- Elevation: 377 m (1,237 ft)

Population (2025-12-31)
  - Total: 3,083
  - Density: 101.1/km^{2} (261.9/sq mi)
- Time zone: UTC+01:00 (CET)
  - Summer (DST): UTC+02:00 (CEST)
- Postal codes: 74746
- Dialling codes: 06283
- Vehicle registration: MOS, BCH
- Website: www.hoepfingen.de

Höpfingen, sometimes spelled Hoepfingen, is a municipality in the district of Neckar-Odenwald-Kreis, in Baden-Württemberg, Germany.

== Administration ==
The municipality consists of two subdivisions:

- Höpfingen
- Waldstetten

== Geography ==
The district lies on the southeastern slope of the Odenwald mountain range. Part is included with the Neckartal-Odenwald Nature Park, one of the largest national parks in Baden-Württemberg.

Höpfingen, in the northern part of the municipality, has forests, fields and meadows. To the south, the town of Waldstetten sits in a valley with several streams running through.
