= Waldbrunn, Baden-Württemberg =

Waldbrunn
- Municipality
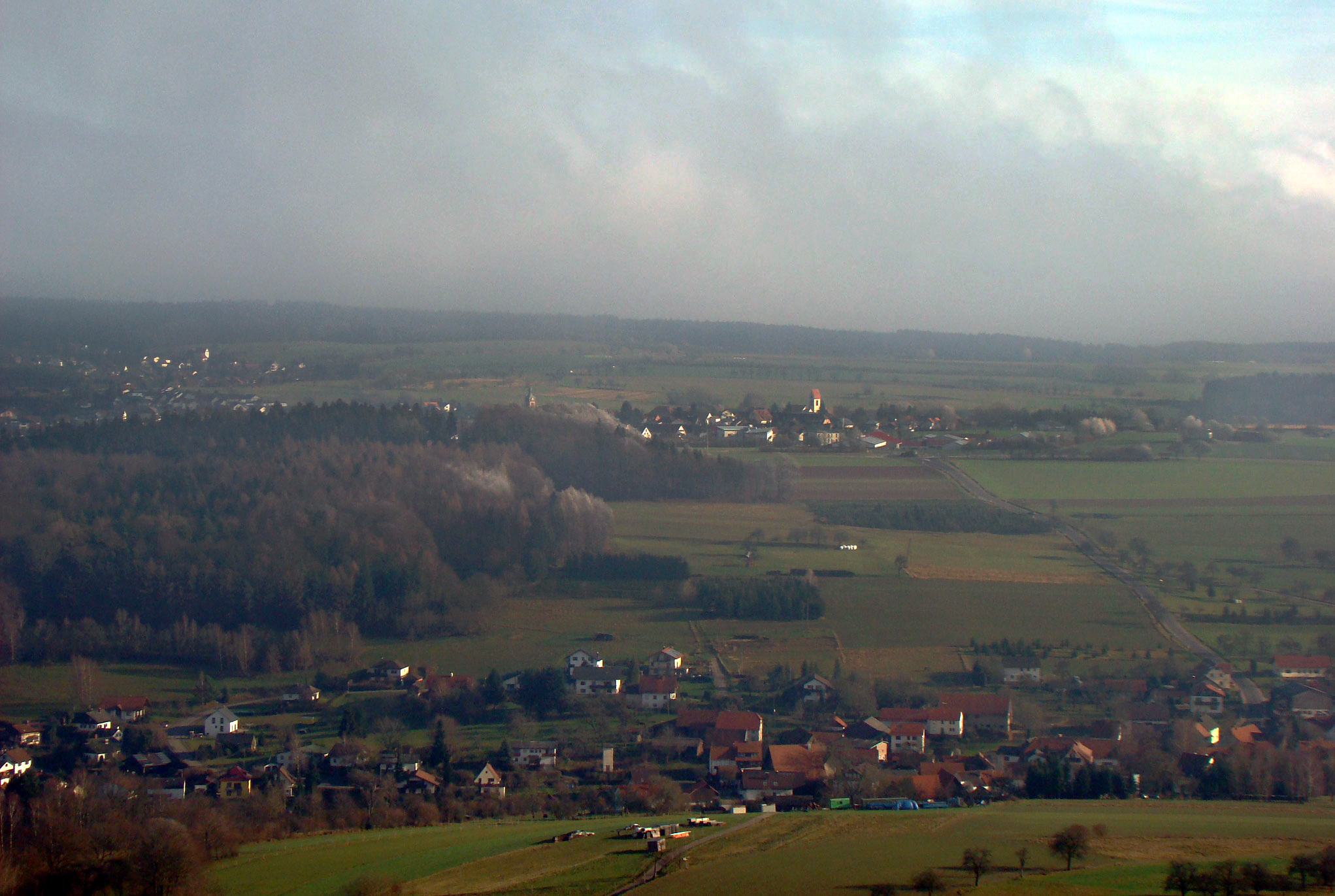
- Waldbrunn

- Coat of arms

- Location of Waldbrunn within Neckar-Odenwald-Kreis district
- Interactive map of Waldbrunn
- Location within Germany Location within Baden-Württemberg
- Coordinates: 49°27′55″N 9°4′53″E
- Country: Germany
- State: Baden-Württemberg
- Admin. region: Karlsruhe
- District: Neckar-Odenwald-Kreis
- Municipal assoc.: Neckargerach-Waldbrunn
- Subdivisions: 6

Government
  - Mayor (2021–29): Markus Haas (CDU)

Area
  - Total: 44.32 km^{2} (17.11 sq mi)
- Elevation: 514 m (1,686 ft)

Population (2025-12-31)
  - Total: 4,689
  - Density: 105.8/km^{2} (274.0/sq mi)
- Time zone: UTC+01:00 (CET)
  - Summer (DST): UTC+02:00 (CEST)
- Postal codes: 69429
- Dialling codes: 06274
- Vehicle registration: MOS, BCH
- Website: www.waldbrunn-odenwald.de

Waldbrunn (German pronunciation: [ˈvaltˌbʁʊn]) is a town in the district of Neckar-Odenwald-Kreis, in Baden-Württemberg, Germany.

== People ==
- Theodor Leutwein (1849-1921), German colonial administrator
- Paul Steiner (born 1957), German football player
- Timo Bracht (born 1975), German athlete
