= Fahrenbach (disambiguation) =

Fahrenbach is a town in the district of Neckar-Odenwald-Kreis, in Baden-Württemberg, Germany.

Fahrenbach may also refer to:

- Fahrenbach (Fürth, Hesse), a district of the community Fürth in Hesse, Germany
- Fahrenbach (Rosbach), a river of Hesse, Germany, tributary of the Rosbach
- Wahlebach, a river of Hesse, Germany, in its upper course called Fahrenbach, tributary of the Fulda
- Heinrich Fahrenbach, one of the members of the IV. German Reichstag (Weimar Republic)
