= Limbach, Baden-Württemberg =

Limbach
- Municipality
- Coat of arms

- Location of Limbach within Neckar-Odenwald-Kreis district
- Interactive map of Limbach
- Location within Germany Location within Baden-Württemberg
- Coordinates: 49°27′42″N 09°12′41″E
- Country: Germany
- State: Baden-Württemberg
- Admin. region: Karlsruhe
- District: Neckar-Odenwald-Kreis
- Subdivisions: 7

Government
  - Mayor (2018–26): Thorsten Weber

Area
  - Total: 43.59 km^{2} (16.83 sq mi)
- Elevation: 361 m (1,184 ft)

Population (2025-12-31)
  - Total: 4,466
  - Density: 102.5/km^{2} (265.4/sq mi)
- Time zone: UTC+01:00 (CET)
  - Summer (DST): UTC+02:00 (CEST)
- Postal codes: 74838, 74834 (Heidersbacher Mühle)
- Dialling codes: 06287
- Vehicle registration: MOS, BCH
- Website: www.limbach.de

Limbach (German pronunciation: [ˈlɪmbax]) is a municipality in the district of Neckar-Odenwald-Kreis, in Baden-Württemberg, Germany.

== History ==
The earliest signs of human habitation in the area date to 100-150 AD.

Limbach is first mentioned in the records of the Benedictine abbey at Amorbach. The settlement belonged to the abbey in the 11th century, along with five other neighboring villages.

At the beginning of the 14th century, the village was sold to Eberhard von Erbach, who sold it to the Archbishop of Mainz in 1318.

The castle was destroyed by farmers in 1525.

From 1318 to 1803, the village belonged to the bishopric of Mainz. In 1803, it was given to the princes of Leiningen in Baden.

During the middle of the 19th century, there was a famine in the Odenwald, and many of the inhabitants left.

In World War I, 71 soldiers from the village were killed, and in World War II, 278. Since that time, the resettlement of Germans from the east and central Europe has greatly increased the population. In 1950, there were already 898 new settlers.

== Demographics ==
Population development:

Year	Inhabitants
1990	4,462
2001	4,685
2011	4,481
2021	4,544
