= Ravenstein, Germany =

Ravenstein
- Town
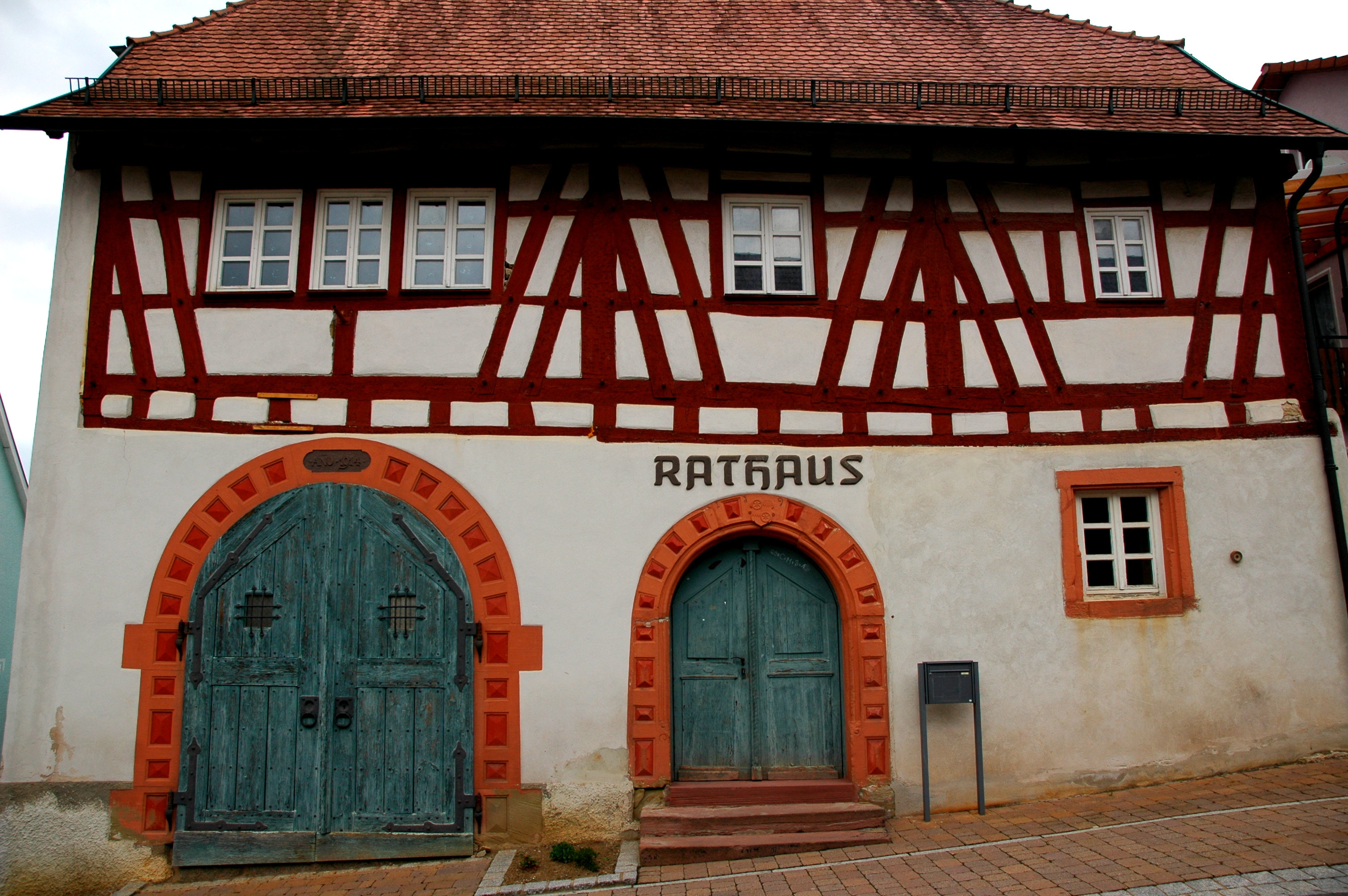
- Old town hall

- Coat of arms

- Location of Ravenstein within Neckar-Odenwald-Kreis district
- Interactive map of Ravenstein
- Location within Germany Location within Baden-Württemberg
- Coordinates: 49°24′4″N 9°30′28″E
- Country: Germany
- State: Baden-Württemberg
- Admin. region: Karlsruhe
- District: Neckar-Odenwald-Kreis
- Subdivisions: 6

Government
  - Mayor (2019–27): Ralf Killian

Area
  - Total: 55.97 km^{2} (21.61 sq mi)
- Elevation: 286 m (938 ft)

Population (2025-12-31)
  - Total: 2,971
  - Density: 53.08/km^{2} (137.5/sq mi)
- Time zone: UTC+01:00 (CET)
  - Summer (DST): UTC+02:00 (CEST)
- Postal codes: 74747
- Dialling codes: 06297
- Vehicle registration: MOS, BCH
- Website: www.ravenstein.de

Ravenstein (German pronunciation: [ˈʁaːvn̩ˌʃtaɪn]) is a town in the Neckar-Odenwald district, in Baden-Württemberg, Germany. It is situated 19 km northwest of Künzelsau, and 35 km northeast of Heilbronn.
