= Lobbach (Elsenz) =

River in Germany

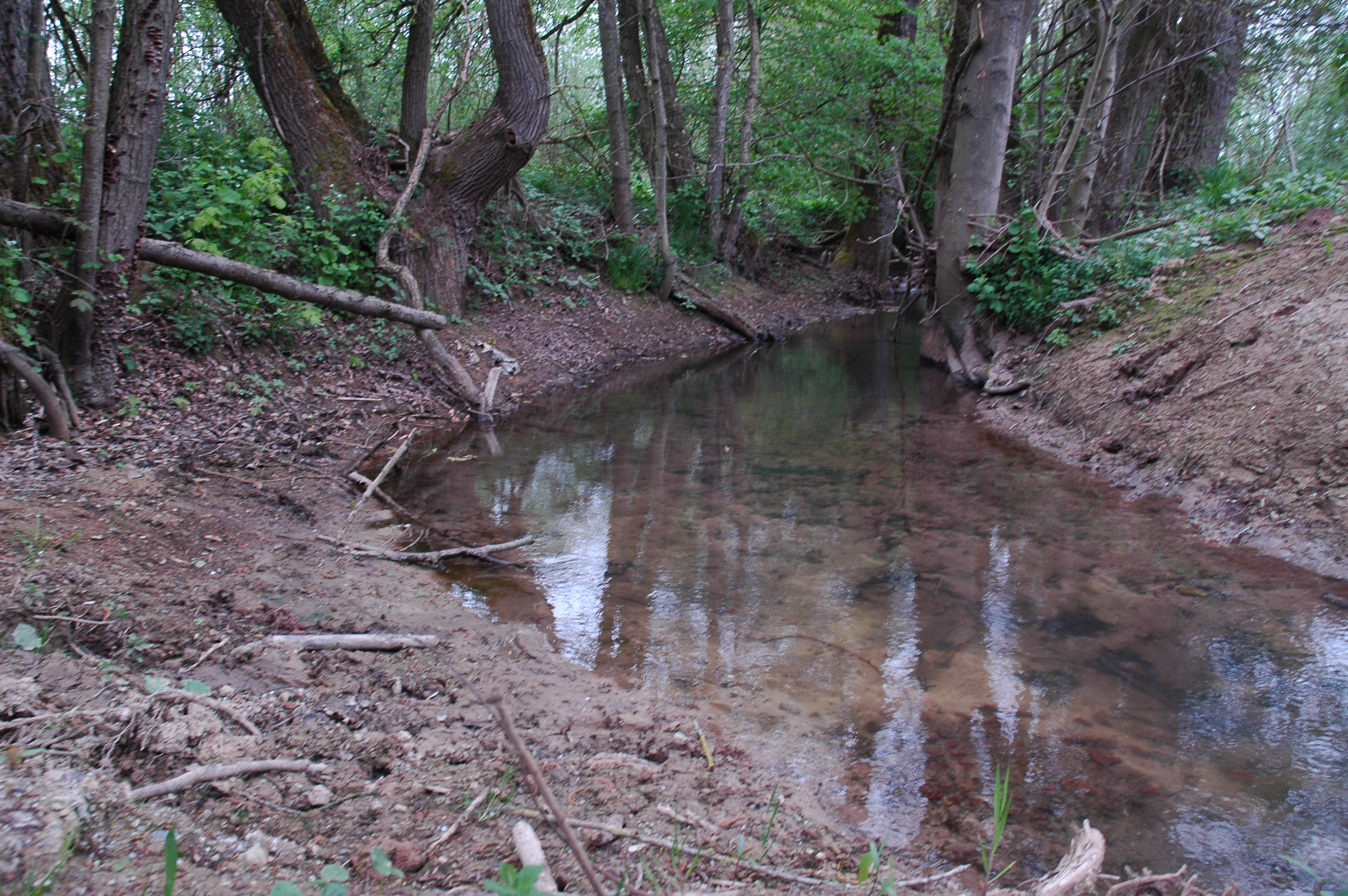

Location
- Country: Germany
- State: Baden-Württemberg

Physical characteristics
- Mouth
  - location: Elsenz
  - coordinates: 49.3200°N 8.8190°E
- Length: 14.9 km (9.3 mi)

Basin features
- Progression: Elsenz→ Neckar→ Rhine→ North Sea

Lobbach is a river of Baden-Württemberg, Germany. It is a right tributary of the Elsenz in Meckesheim.

== See also ==
- List of rivers of Baden-Württemberg
