= Timo Bracht =

German triathlete (born 1975)

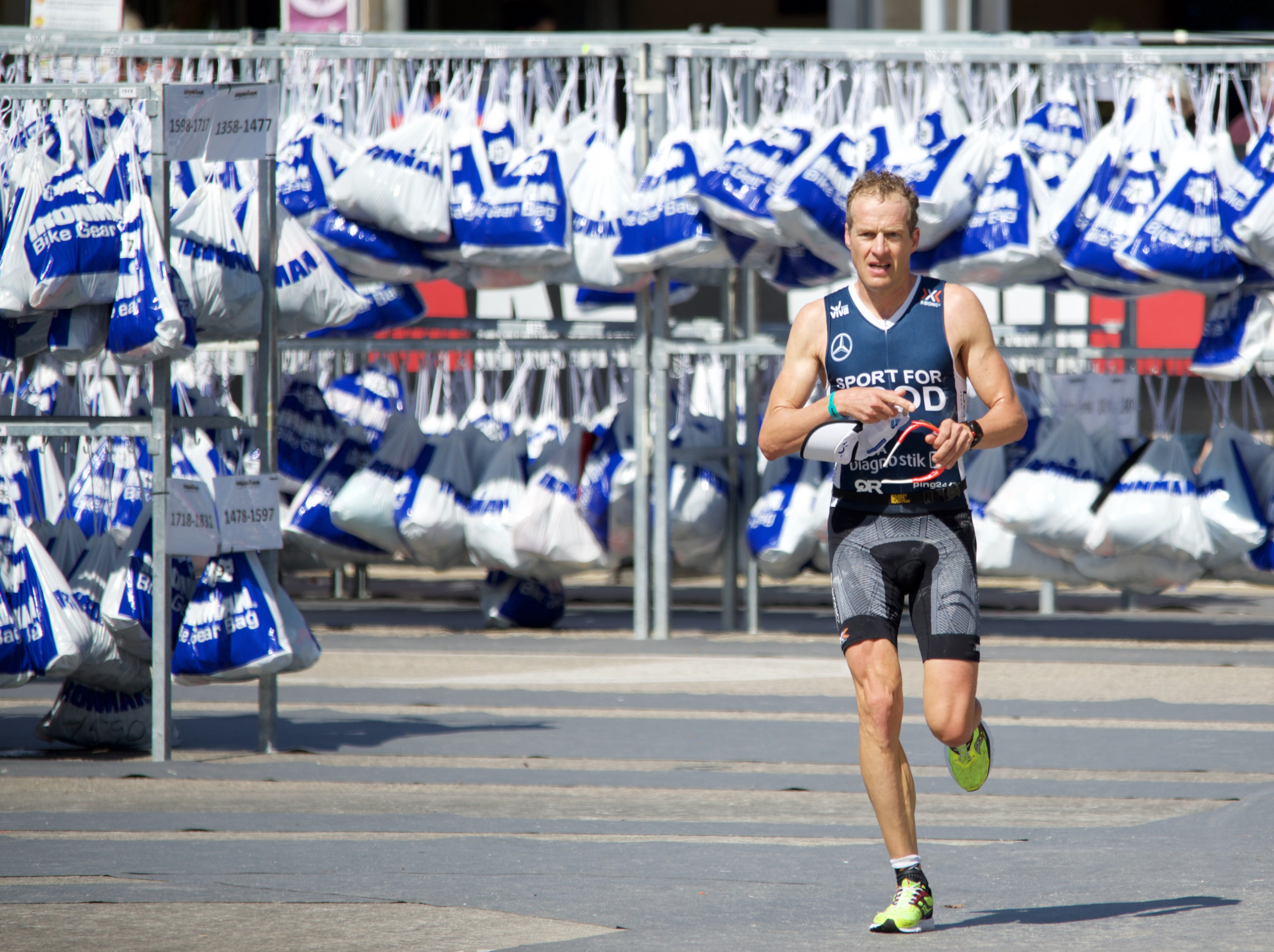
- Timo Bracht at Ironman Mallorca 2015

Personal information
- Born: July 22, 1975 (age 50) Waldbrunn, Baden-Württemberg, Germany
- Height: 182 cm (5 ft 11 1/2 in)
- Weight: 68 kg (150 lb)

Sport
- Turned pro: 1993
Medal record
Men's Triathlon
Representing Germany
ETU Long Distance World Championships
Gold medal – first place	2012 Gérardmer	Elite

Timo Bracht (born July 22, 1975 in Waldbrunn) is an Athlete from Germany, who competed in triathlon. Several times Ironman champion and European Long Distance Triathlon Champion (2012). Timo Bracht is in the list of the Bestenliste deutscher Triathleten auf der Ironman-Distanz

== Career ==
Timo Bracht started his Triathlon career in 1993 and celebrated in 2003 winning the Ironman France in Gérardmer his first title as professional Triathlete.

=== Professional Triathlete since 1994 ===
Since 1994 he started as professional Triathlete and in 2004 he achieved 8th place at the Ironman World Championship in Kona, Hawai. Later on he reached 3rd place in Roth and competed in 2005 in Kona achieving position 53.cht wiederholen und wurde nur 53.

== Athletic achievements ==
Triathlon Short- and Middle-distance
Date/Year	Ranking	Competition	Location	Time	Observations
July 10, 2016	6	Ironman 70.3 Jönköping	Sweden Jönköping	03:56:55	bei der Erstaustragung
June 5, 2016	3	Keszthely Triathlon	Hungary Keszthely		auf der Halbdistanz
April 23, 2016	3	Challenge Fuerteventura	Spain Fuerteventura	04:00:56	Dritter auf der Halbdistanz
August 23, 2015	4	Ironman 70.3 Bintan	Indonesia Bintan	04:04:42	
May 17, 2015	2	Heidesee-Triathlon	Germany Forst	01:21:47,95	Zweiter hinter Sebastian Kienle auf der verkürzten Olympischen Distanz (1 km Schwimmen, 32 km Radfahren und 7,5 km Laufen)
April 25, 2015	4	Challenge Fuerteventura	Spain Fuerteventura	04:05:18	als bester Deutscher
December 6, 2014	28	Challenge Bahrain	Bahrain Bahrain	04:00:30	bei der Erstaustragung
May 3, 2014	16	Ironman 70.3 St. George	United States St. George	03:54:05	US-Championships
September 1, 2013	2	Challenge Walchsee-Kaiserwinkl	Austria Walchsee		
June 9, 2013	3	Challenge Kraichgau	Germany Kraichgau		Deutsche Meisterschaft auf der Triathlon-Mitteldistanz
September 2, 2012	2	Challenge Walchsee-Kaiserwinkl	Austria Walchsee	03:52:50	
June 3, 2012	1	Mußbach-Triathlon	Germany Mußbach	02:00:57	Sieger auf der Olympischen Distanz – neben Laura Philipp bei den Frauen
May 7, 2012	1	Mallorca Olympic	Spain Colònia de Sant Jordi	01:47:13	Sieger vor Georg Potrebitsch
September 4, 2011	2	Challenge Walchsee-Kaiserwinkl	Austria Walchsee	03:51:51	
August 22, 2011	1	Viernheimer V-Card Triathlon	Germany Viernheim	02:14:25	
August 7, 2011	2	Frankfurt-City-Triathlon	Germany Frankfurt am Main	02:02:38	Zweiter hinter Johann Ackermann
July 23, 2011	1	RömerMan	Germany Ladenburg	02:00:05	Sieg mit neuem Streckenrekord
May 8, 2011	7	Siegerland-Cup	Germany Buschhütten	01:50:04	
March 12, 2011	9	Abu Dhabi International Triathlon	United Arab Emirates Abu Dhabi	06:49:40	3 km Schwimmen, 200 km Radfahren und 20 km Laufen
August 22, 2010	2	Viernheimer V-Card Triathlon	Germany Viernheim	02:15:10	Zweiter beim Rhein-Neckar-Cup (1,5 km Schwimmen, 46 km Radfahren und 10 km Laufen)
June 13, 2010	3	Citytriathlon Heilbronn	Germany Heilbronn	03:00:06	2 km Schwimmen, 70 km Radfahren und 15 km Laufen
May 9, 2010	6	Siegerland-Cup	Germany Buschhütten	01:44:14	hinter dem Sieger Sebastian Kienle (1 km Schwimmen, 41,7 km Radfahren und 10 km Laufen)
June 7, 2009	1	Mußbach Triathlon	Germany Mußbach	02:03:42	
2008	1	DTU Deutsche Triathlon-Meisterschaft Mitteldistanz	Germany Kulmbach		Deutscher Meister beim Mönchshof-Triathlon
July 5, 2007	3	HeidelbergMan	Germany Heidelberg		
March 18, 2006	17	Ironman 70.3 California	United States Oceanside	04:18:43	
August 6, 2006	3	HeidelbergMan	Germany Heidelberg		
2005	3	Ironman 70.3 California	United States Oceanside		
2004	1	Kohler Haardman	Germany Oer-Erkenschwick	03:39:47	Sieg auf der Mitteldistanz (2 km Schwimmen, 81,2 km Radfahren und 20 km Laufen) vor Thomas Hellriegel
2004	(1)	DTU Deutsche Triathlon Meisterschaft Mitteldistanz	Germany Kulmbach	(04:08:14)	Timo Bracht konnte seinen Startpass nicht vorlegen und so ging der Titel an den zweitschnellsten Stefan Holzner.
August 1, 2004	2	HeidelbergMan	Germany Heidelberg	02:04:39	zweiter Rang auf der Kurzdistanz (1,7 km Schwimmen, (Zahl fehlt) km Radfahren und 10 km Laufen) hinter Craig Cunningham
March 21, 2004	1	Ironman 70.3 South Africa	South Africa East London		
August 10, 2003	1	HeidelbergMan	Germany Heidelberg	02:05:30	Sieg vor Steffen Liebetrau
July 26, 2003	18	Alpen-Triathlon	Germany Schliersee	02:07:39	hinter dem Sieger Hektor Llanos (1,5 km Schwimmen, 40 km Radfahren und 10 km Laufen)

Long-distance Triathlon
Date/Year	Ranking	Competition	Location	Time	Observations
September 23, 2017	5	Ironman Italy	Italy Cervia	08:25:40	bei der Erstaustragung
July 9, 2017	4	Challenge Roth	Germany Roth	08:07:01	
October 8, 2016	28	Ironman Hawaii	United States Hawaii	08:43:37	
July 24, 2016	2	Ironman Switzerland	Switzerland Zürich	08:24:13	
September 26, 2015	1	Ironman Mallorca	Spain Alcúdia	08:17:22	Sieg mit neuem Streckenrekord
July 12, 2015	2	DTU Deutsche Meisterschaft Triathlon Langdistanz	Germany Roth	07:56:31	Vize-Meister Triathlon-Langdistanz – als Zweiter beim Challenge Roth hinter Nils Frommhold
September 27, 2014	13	Ironman Mallorca	Spain Alcúdia	08:58:37	Schnellster Deutscher bei der Erstaustragung auf Mallorca
July 20, 2014	1	DTU Deutsche Meisterschaft Triathlon Langdistanz	Germany Roth	07:56:00	Sieg beim Challenge Roth und erneut Deutscher Meister auf der Langdistanz
October 12, 2013	9	Ironman Hawaii	United States Hawaii	08:26:32	
July 14, 2013	1	DTU Deutsche Meisterschaft Triathlon Langdistanz	Germany Roth	08:08:18	Deutscher Meister auf der Langdistanz als Dritter beim Challenge Roth
March 17, 2013	1	Ironman Los Cabos	Mexico Los Cabos	08:26:48	Sieger bei der Erstaustragung
December 9, 2012	DSQ	Ironman Western Australia	Australia Busselton	–	
October 13, 2012	6	Ironman Hawaii	United States Hawaii	08:30:57	
July 8, 2012	1	ETU Challenge Long Distance Triathlon European Championships	Germany Roth	08:03:28	Triathlon-Europameister auf der Langdistanz – mit dem zweiten Rang bei der Challenge Roth hinter dem Südafrikaner James Cunnama
December 4, 2011	1	Ironman Western Australia	Australia Busselton	08:12:39	
October 8, 2011	5	Ironman Hawaii	United States Hawaii	08:20:12	mit der drittschnellsten Laufzeit für die Marathon-Distanz (2:47:26 Stunden) bei der Ironman World Championship
May 21, 2011	1	Ironman Lanzarote	Spain Puerto del Carmen	08:30:34	Sieg mit neuem Streckenrekord
November 21, 2010	1	Ironman Arizona	United States Tempe	08:07:16	
October 9, 2010	6	Ironman Hawaii	United States Hawaii	08:21:00	Bei seinem zehnten Start bei der Ironman World Championship konnte Timo Bracht als zweitbester Deutscher seinen 6. Rang aus dem Vorjahr wiederholen.
July 4, 2010	2	Ironman Germany	Germany Frankfurt am Main	08:10:22	Zweiter bei der Ironman European Championship
October 10, 2009	6	Ironman Hawaii	United States Hawaii	08:28:52	Zwischenfall beim Schwimmen kostet Zeit.
July 5, 2009	1	Ironman Germany	Germany Frankfurt am Main	07:59:16	Sieger der Ironman European Championship mit persönlicher Ironman-Bestzeit und neuem Streckenrekord
October 11, 2008	DSQ	Ironman Hawaii	United States Hawaii	–	2008 kam Timo Bracht als Fünfter und schnellster Deutscher ins Ziel, wurde allerdings nachträglich, auf Grund einer nicht eingehaltenen Zeitstrafe, disqualifiziert (8:23:04 Stunden).
July 6, 2008	3	Ironman Germany	Germany Frankfurt am Main	08:04:16	
October 13, 2007	15	Ironman Hawaii	United States Hawaii	08:37:52	
July 1, 2007	1	Ironman Germany	Germany Frankfurt am Main	08:09:15	
October 12, 2006	11	Ironman Hawaii	United States Hawaii	08:30:24	
June 23, 2006	2	Ironman Germany	Germany Frankfurt am Main	08:17:32	
October 15, 2005	53	Ironman Hawaii	United States Hawaii	09:02:33	
July 3, 2005	3	Challenge Roth	Germany Roth	08:14:26	
October 16, 2004	8	Ironman Hawaii	United States Hawaii	09:03:11	
July 4, 2007	3	Challenge Roth	Germany Roth	8:08:03	hinter Chris McCormack und Faris Al-Sultan
November 8, 2203	1	Ironman Florida	United States Panama City	08:30:29	
October 14, 2003	DNF	Ironman Hawaii	United States Hawaii	–	auf der Radstrecke ausgestiegen
June 21, 2006	1	Ironman France	France Gérardmer	08:33:11	Sieg mit neuem Streckenrekord
October 19, 2002	26	Ironman Hawaii	United States Hawaii	09:04:36	
June 22, 2002	3	Ironman France	France Gérardmer	09:18:51	
October 6, 2001	32	Ironman Hawaii	United States Hawaii	09:23:42	
July 8, 2001	12	Ironman Europe	Germany Roth	08:45:37	schnellster Amateur
July 9, 200	68	Ironman Europe	Germany Roth	09:19:41	

(DNF – Did Not Finish; DSQ – Disqualifikation)

== Publications ==
- Die Triathlonbibel: Das Standardwerk für alle Triathleten, von Timo Bracht, Niclas Bock, Nina Eggert, Caroline Cornfine, u. a., spomedis (31. März 2015), ISBN 978-3-95590-050-2
