= Billigheim =

- Municipality
- Coat of arms

- Location of Billigheim within Neckar-Odenwald-Kreis district
- Interactive map of Billigheim
- Location within Germany Location within Baden-Württemberg
- Coordinates: 49°20′52″N 09°15′16″E
- Country: Germany
- State: Baden-Württemberg
- Admin. region: Karlsruhe
- District: Neckar-Odenwald-Kreis
- Subdivisions: 5

Government
  - Mayor (2017–25): Martin Diblik

Area
  - Total: 48.95 km^{2} (18.90 sq mi)
- Elevation: 226 m (741 ft)

Population (2025-12-31)
  - Total: 6,072
  - Density: 124.0/km^{2} (321.3/sq mi)
- Time zone: UTC+01:00 (CET)
  - Summer (DST): UTC+02:00 (CEST)
- Postal codes: 74842
- Dialling codes: 06265 + 06264
- Vehicle registration: MOS, BCH
- Website: www.billigheim.de

Billigheim is a municipality in the district of Neckar-Odenwald-Kreis, in Baden-Württemberg, Germany. The town of Billigheim has five local subdivisions: Sulzbach (1803 Inhabitants), Billigheim, Allfeld, Waldmühlbach and Katzental.

== History ==
The first historic mention of Billigheim is in the archives of Würzburg in the year 1000. At that time, a convent was founded there. The convent owned the village until secularization in 1584. At that time, the convent was closed, and the village was given to Kurmainz.

In 1803, along with the entire area, the town was given to the dukes of Leiningen in Baden, who remodeled the convent into a palace. This palace burned to the ground in 1902. The remaining church was remodeled in 1878–79.

In 1806 Billigheim became part of the Grand Duchy of Baden.

From the German Wikipedia:

Around the year 1000, Bishop Heinrich of Würzburg founded a Benedictine convent in Billigheim, which is first mentioned as "Closter Bullikhemb." The older settlement, which likely predates this, was probably established by a Frankish regional prince from the Bulling family. In 1238, at the request of the nuns, the convent was converted into a Cistercian monastery and flourished during the 13th century, holding local authority until its dissolution.

In 1361, the village and the monastery came under the control of the Electorate of Mainz and were administered by the Allfeld estate. In 1462, Billigheim was besieged and attacked by Pfalzgraf Ludwig of Zweibrücken. However, under the command of Hans von Gemmingen, the village was successfully defended and the attackers were repelled. The monastery was weakened by the Peasants' War and the Reformation in the 16th century, and was finally dissolved in 1584 by Archbishop Wolfgang von Dalberg. The Allfeld cellarer also served as the master of the estate in Billigheim. Around 1700, the administration of the Allfeld estate was transferred to Billigheim.

Following the Reichsdeputationshauptschluss, the Electorate of Mainz was secularized, and the Billigheim estate fell to the Principality of Leiningen in 1803. The Leiningian princes built a castle in the village in 1803, which was destroyed by fire in 1902.

== Twin towns – sister cities ==
- Óbuda-Békásmegyer (Budapest), Hungary

== Gallery ==
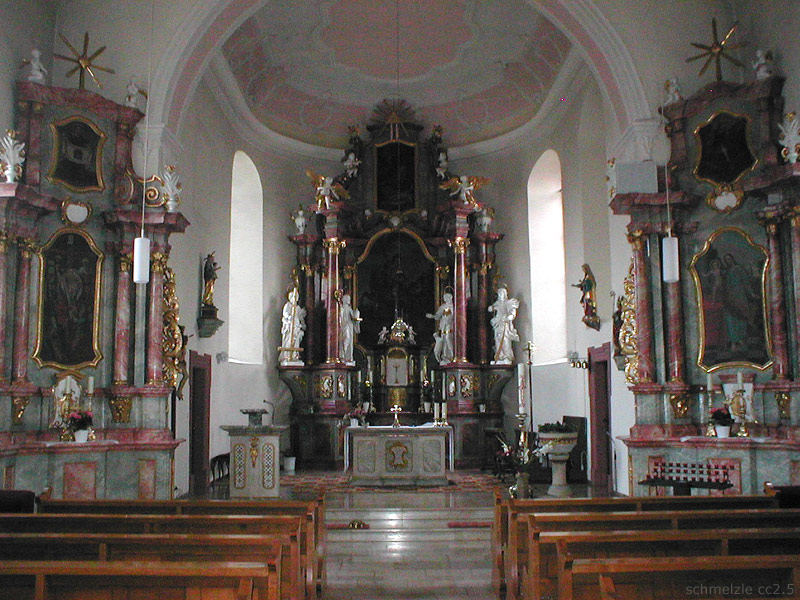
Altar of Saint George's church, Allfeld, Billigheim

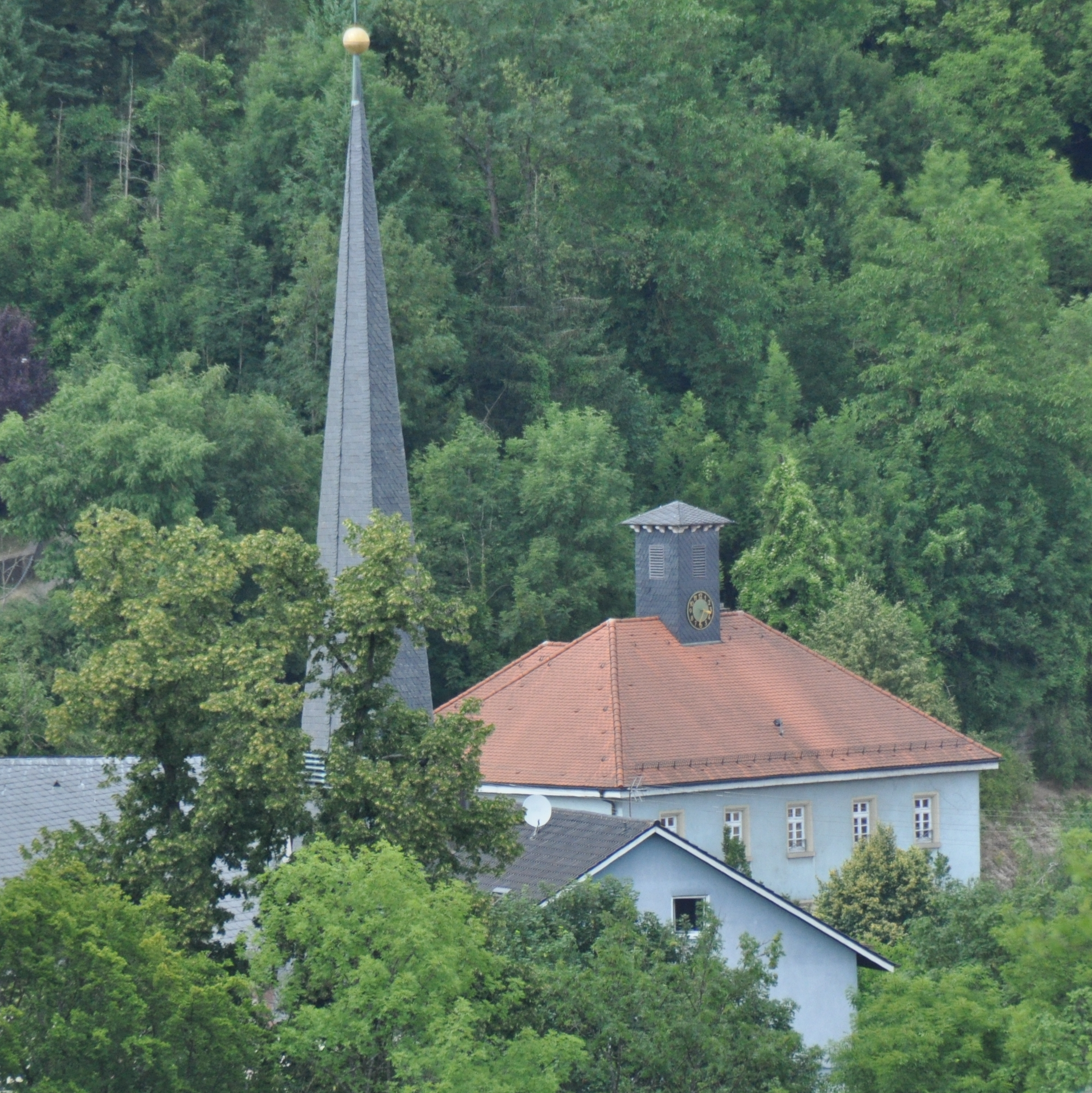
The old town hall of Billigheim

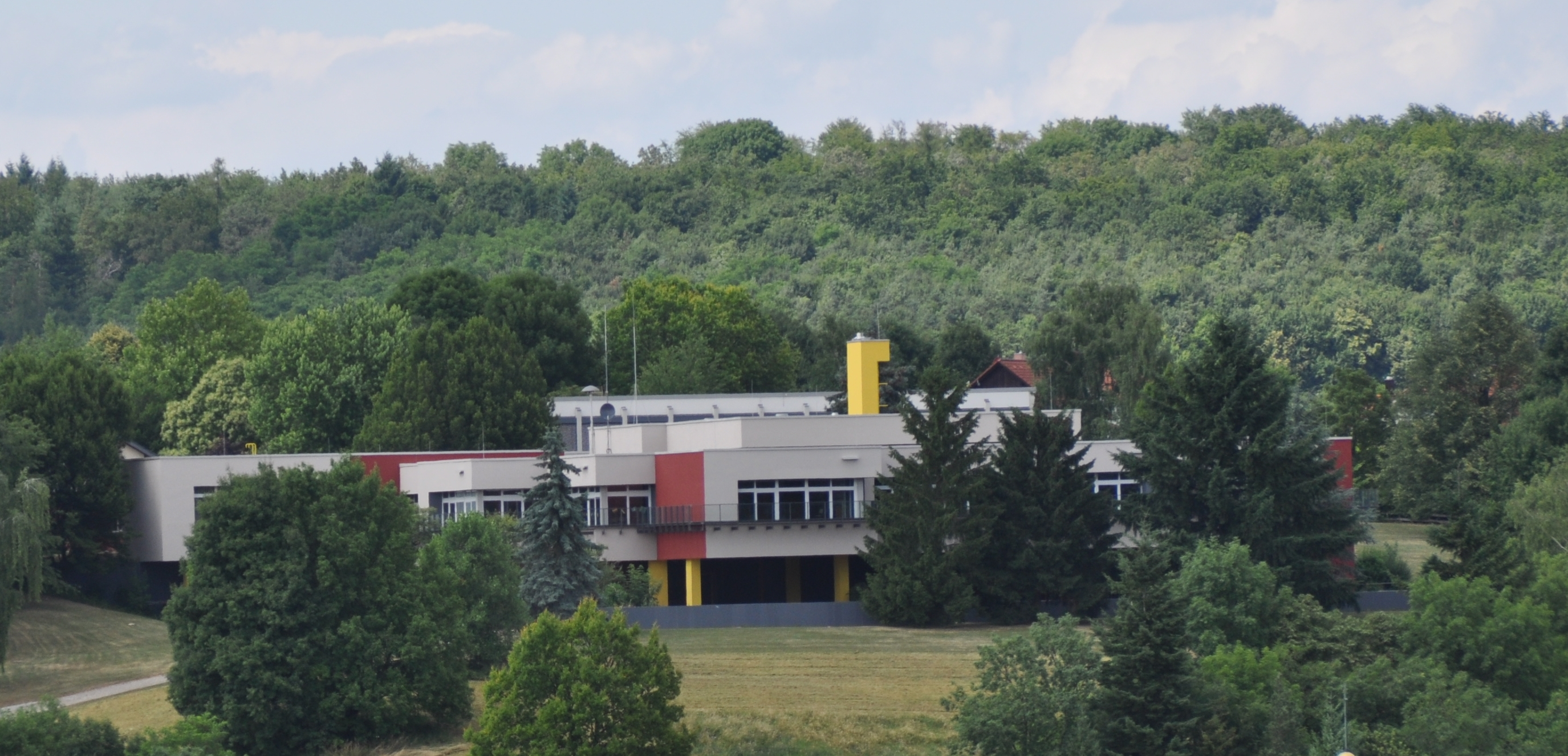
Primary and Secondary School of Billigheim
