= Sulzbach (Billigheim) =

Coordinates: 49°21′11″N 9°13′04″E

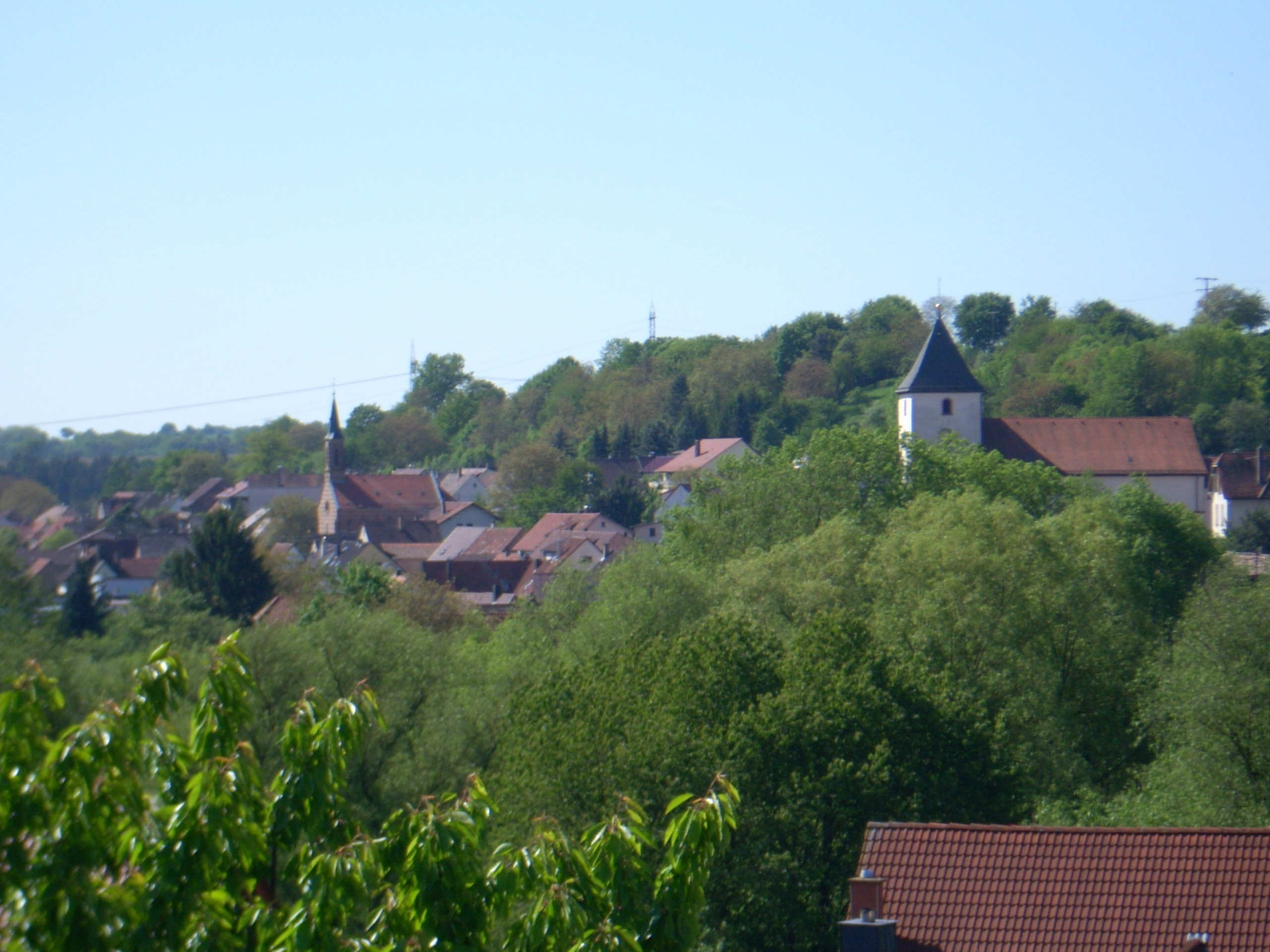
Sulzbach

Sulzbach (German pronunciation: [ˈzʊltsbax]) is the most populous residential district (of five) of the city of Billigheim, Germany. It is located in Neckar-Odenwald-county, five kilometers (3.1 mi) west of Billigheim and six kilometers (3.7 mi) east of Mosbach.

Sulzbach has about 1803 inhabitants, who are largely Christian. A large number of the inhabitants are Roman Catholic, and there is also a significant Evangelical community in the city.

On 1 February 1974, Sulzbach was incorporated into Billigheim.
