= KZ Walldorf =

Coordinates: 50°1′7.6″N 8°35′0.5″E

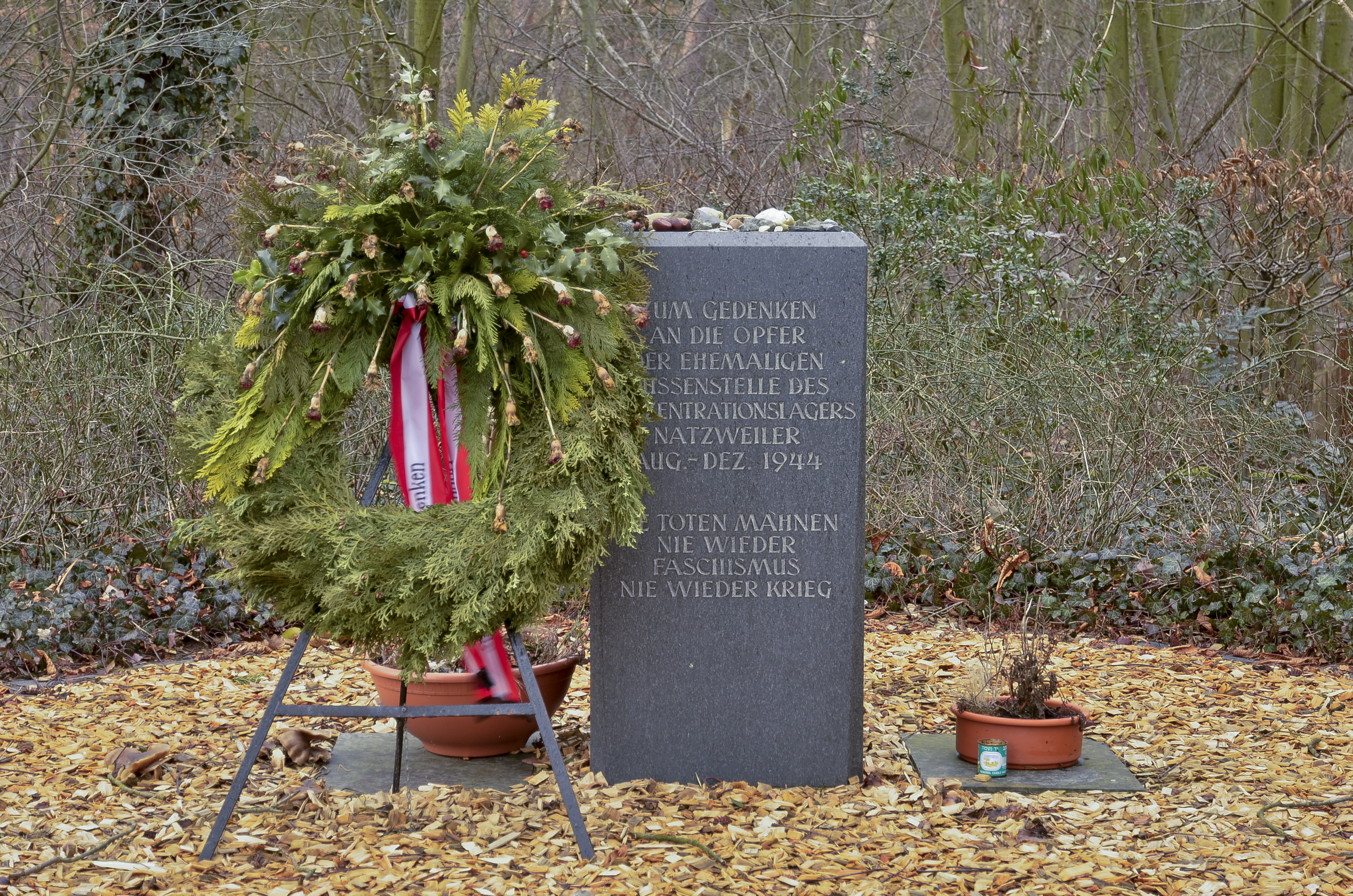
Memorial place - Nazi labour camp Walldorf - Airport Frankfurt

KZ Walldorf was a subcamp of the Natzweiler-Struthof concentration camp and existed from 22 August to 24 November 1944 near the village of Walldorf in Hesse. Erected after the deportations of the Jews in Hungary as part of the Nazi extermination through labour plan, about 1,700 female inmates were assigned to work on the first paved runway of the nearby Rhein-Main Airport.

== History ==
A Reichsarbeitsdienst hut camp in the forest north of Walldorf already existed at the site during the construction of the Reichsautobahn section from Frankfurt to Darmstadt (the present-day Bundesautobahn 5) opened in 1935. From 1943 it was used as a forced labour camp of the Rodgau-Dieburg prison.

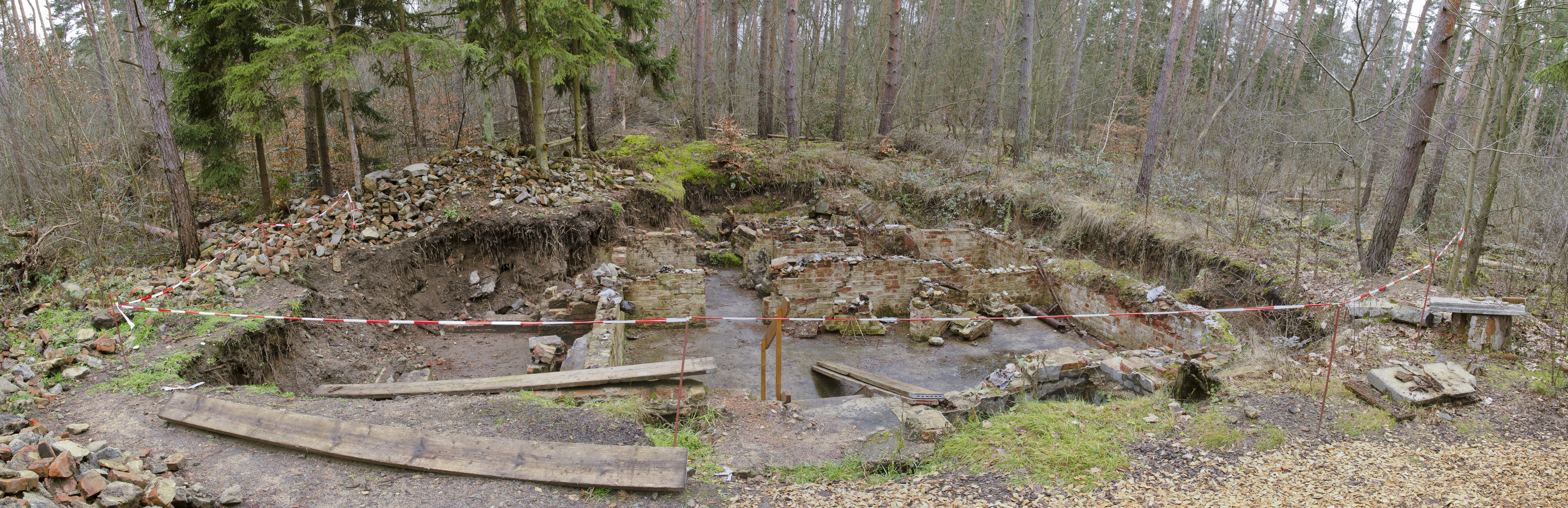
Former cellar of kitchen barrack

Upon the invasion of Wehrmacht troops into Hungary (Operation Margarethe) and the accession of Döme Sztójay as Prime Minister in March 1944, the deportations of the Hungarian Jews to Auschwitz supervised by Adolf Eichmann began on April 27. The Hungarian Jewish women arriving in Walldorf came directly from Auschwitz-Birkenau, where they had narrowly escaped the selection of Josef Mengele and the gas chambers. The arrested 1700 young girls and women aged 14 to 45 years were requested by the Organisation Todt under chief engineer Franz Xaver Dorsch at the SS-Reichssicherheitshauptamt and had to perform forced labor at the construction site of the Züblin company at Frankfurt Airport. About 50 women did not survive this four-month time period of hard work, insufficient rations and physical abuse. Most of the remaining women were no longer able to work when the camp was closed after the liberation of Natzweiler-Struthof in November 1944. Only about 300 survived the further deportations to the Ravensbrück concentration camp and the Holocaust.

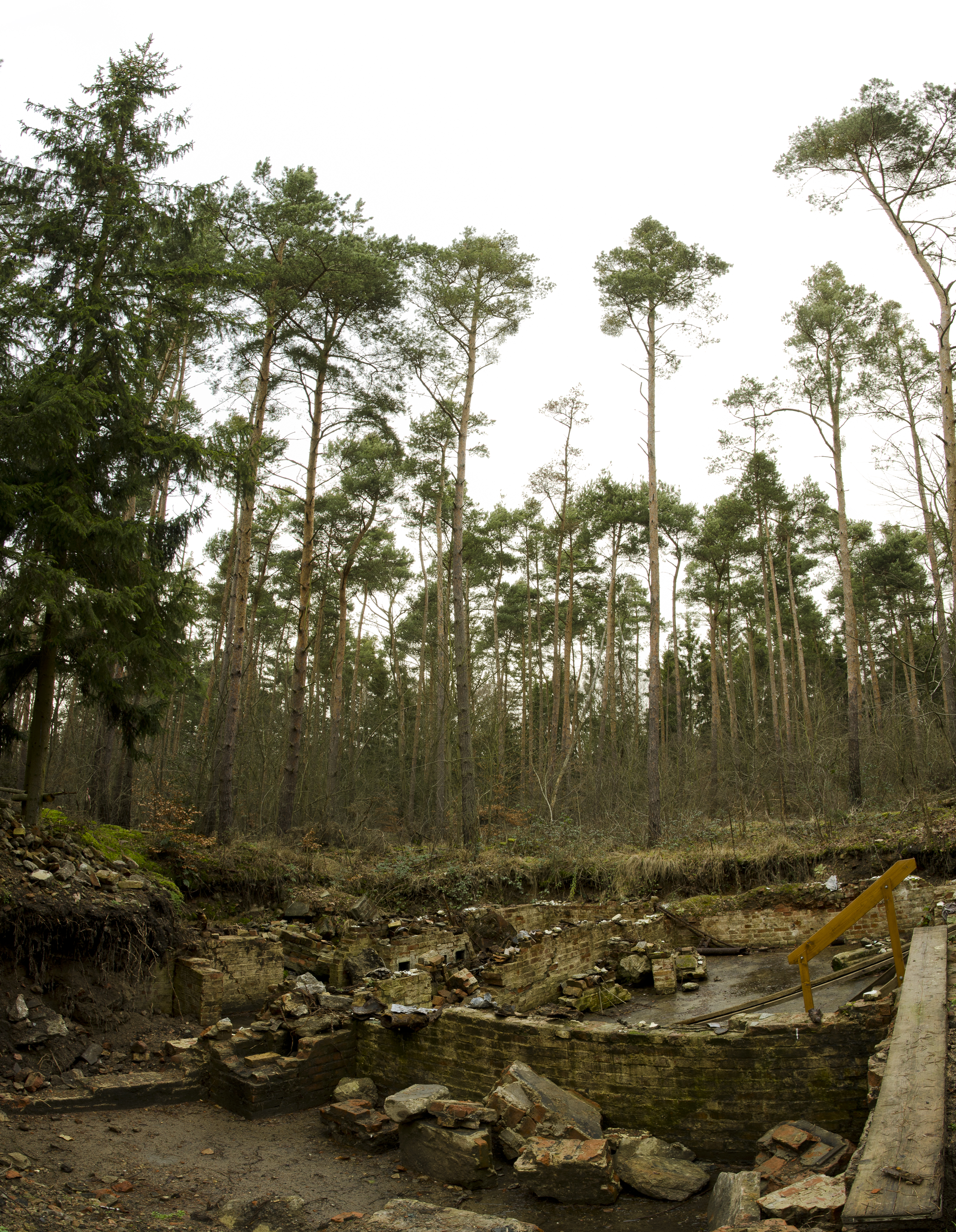
Former cellar of kitchen barrack

After World War II, the runway construction was completed under the US occupation forces and is in use up to today. The former camp, forgotten or repressed, was blown up and the area reforested again. In the 1970s, the camp was rediscovered and a first memorial stone was inaugurated in 1980. From the year 1996 on, there was a continuous and lively analysis of the history of the outpost camp. In the year 2000, attended by 19 survivors, a memorial path was opened in the forest: On several plates the history of the camp and the women imprisoned are described with their individual fates. In addition, a brick-built cellar under the former kitchen barrack was excavated, in which prisoners were beaten to death.

The Margit-Horváth-Foundation was founded in 2004. Margaret Horváth was one of the survivors of this camp. Her son gave his mothers so-called compensation money to the foundation, which now forms the symbolic core of the Foundation. History and review of the KZ-branch Walldorf are also the subject of the movie The Runway by Malte Rauch, Eva and Bernard Voosen Türcke (2003).
