= Binau =

- Municipality
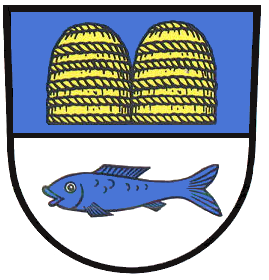
- Coat of arms

- Location of Binau within Neckar-Odenwald-Kreis district
- Interactive map of Binau
- Location within Germany Location within Baden-Württemberg
- Coordinates: 49°22′00″N 09°03′26″E
- Country: Germany
- State: Baden-Württemberg
- Admin. region: Karlsruhe
- District: Neckar-Odenwald-Kreis
- Municipal assoc.: Neckargerach-Waldbrunn

Government
  - Mayor (2024–32): Dominik Kircher (CDU)

Area
  - Total: 4.83 km^{2} (1.86 sq mi)
- Elevation: 253 m (830 ft)

Population (2025-12-31)
  - Total: 1,328
  - Density: 275/km^{2} (712/sq mi)
- Time zone: UTC+01:00 (CET)
  - Summer (DST): UTC+02:00 (CEST)
- Postal codes: 74862
- Dialling codes: 06263
- Vehicle registration: MOS, BCH
- Website: www.binau.de

Binau (South Franconian: Bina) is a municipality in the district of Neckar-Odenwald-Kreis, in Baden-Württemberg, Germany.

== History ==
There are signs of human settlement in the area dating from the Bronze Age.

Binau is first mentioned in historical records in 769. The convent in Lorsch had many land holdings in Binau.

The present-day palace stands on the site of an older one, which stood until the middle of the 18th century. Today it is used as a rest home.

The church dates from the 14th century and was remodeled in 1926 and 1956.

The nearby Burg Dauchstein was built in 1150 as a toll station for the Hohenstaufen. It lies about 1.5 km from the town.
