= Neckargerach =

- Municipality
- Coat of arms

- Location of Neckargerach within Neckar-Odenwald-Kreis district
- Interactive map of Neckargerach
- Location within Germany Location within Baden-Württemberg
- Coordinates: 49°23′58″N 9°4′19″E
- Country: Germany
- State: Baden-Württemberg
- Admin. region: Karlsruhe
- District: Neckar-Odenwald-Kreis
- Municipal assoc.: Neckargerach-Waldbrunn
- Subdivisions: 2

Government
  - Mayor (2018–26): Norman Link (CDU)

Area
  - Total: 15.31 km^{2} (5.91 sq mi)
- Elevation: 137 m (449 ft)

Population (2025-12-31)
  - Total: 2,246
  - Density: 146.7/km^{2} (380.0/sq mi)
- Time zone: UTC+01:00 (CET)
  - Summer (DST): UTC+02:00 (CEST)
- Postal codes: 69437
- Dialling codes: 06263
- Vehicle registration: MOS, BCH
- Website: www.neckargerach.de

Neckargerach is a municipality in the district of Neckar-Odenwald-Kreis, in Baden-Württemberg, Germany.

== Demographics ==
Population development:

Year	Inhabitants
1990	2,352
2001	2,414
2011	2,340
2021	2,328

== Mayors ==
- 1915–1919: Johann Georg Steck, butcher
- 1919–1924: Heinrich Gramlich
- 1924–1933: Carl Bödigheimer I
- 1933–1935: Rudolf Bödigheimer
- 1935–1937: Ludwig Menges
- 1937–1945: Christian Seemann, master electrician
- 1945–1965: Karl Wettmann, farmer
- 1965–1974: Peter Kirchesch senior
- 1974–2006: Peter Kirchesch junior
- 2006–2010: Ralf Schnörr
- since March 2010: Norman Link

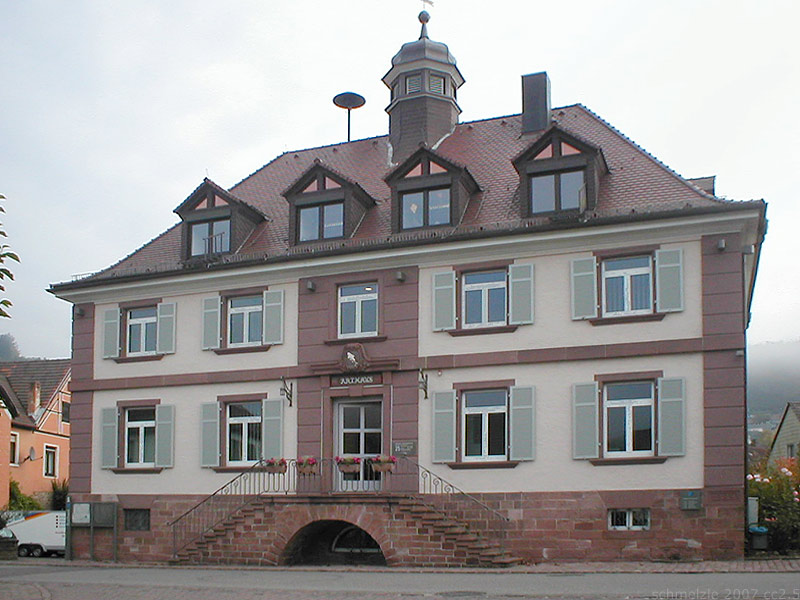
Neckargerach Town hall (2007)
