= Zwingenberg Castle =

Castle in Baden-Württemberg, Germany

- Zwingenberg, Schloss Zwingenberg
- Zwingenberg
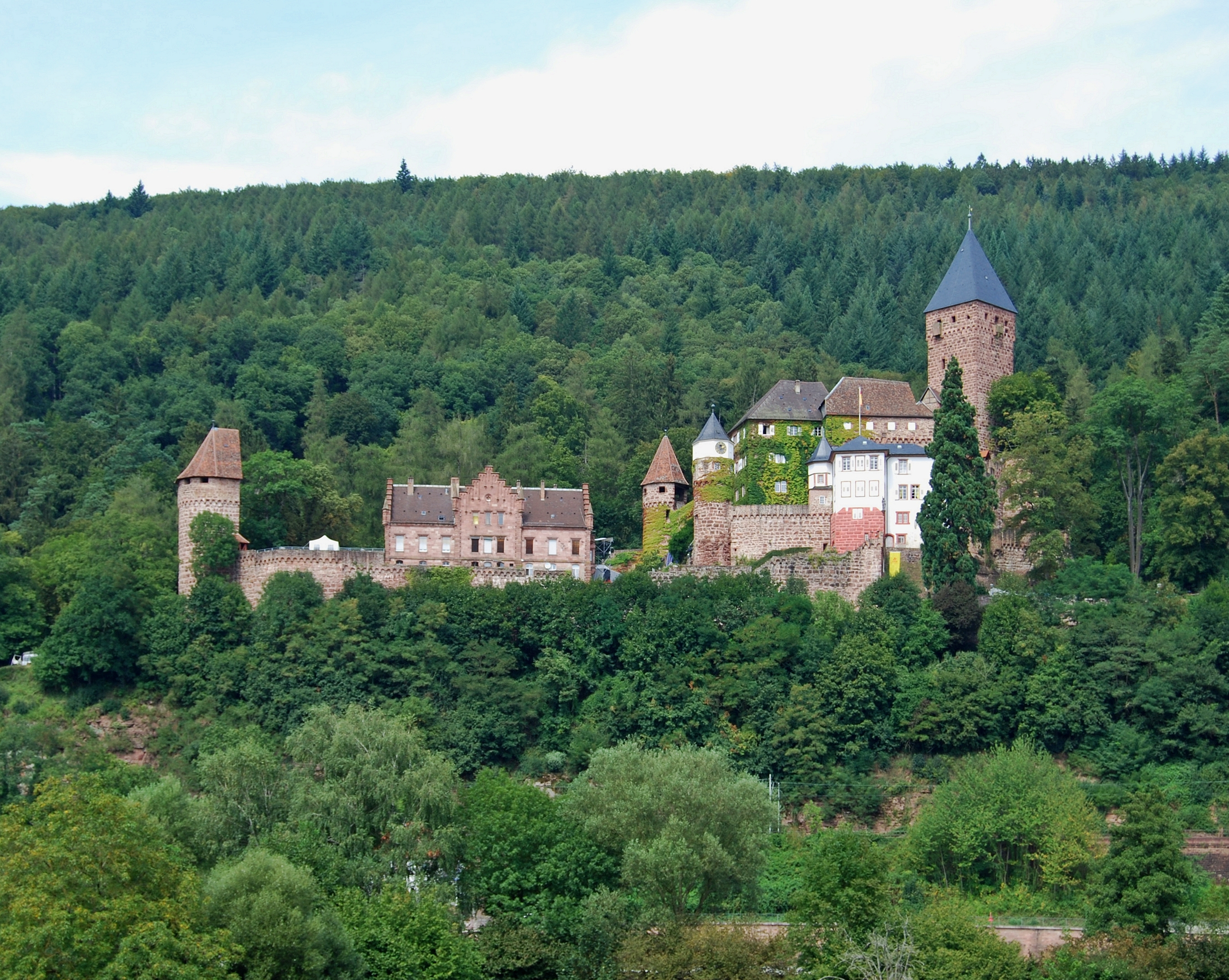
- Zwingenberg Castle in 2009

Site information
- Type: hill castle, spur castle
- Code: DE-BW
- Condition: preserved

Location
- Coordinates: 49°25′19″N 9°02′00″E

Site history
- Built: 13th century

Garrison information
- Occupants: nobility

Zwingenberg Castle (German: Burg Zwingenberg), also known as Zwingenberg or Schloss Zwingenberg, stands on the right bank of the River Neckar where it cuts through the Odenwald hills in central Germany. The castle is located in the municipality of Zwingenberg in the state of Baden-Württemberg.

== Location ==
The spur castle was built on a hill spur above the confluence of the Wolfschlucht gorge and the Neckar valley, approximately 50 metres above the river.

== History ==
The castle was likely constructed in the 13th century by the Hohenstaufen ministerialis William of Wimpfen. The earliest known documentary reference dates to 1326.

A nephew of William of Wimpfen later adopted the name von Zwingenberg. Due to their activities as robber knights, the Zwingenberg family was expelled in 1363, and the castle was subsequently slighted by imperial order.

In 1403, the Lord of Hirschhorn received the castle as a fief and rebuilt it. After the extinction of the Hirschhorn line, ownership passed between the Electorate of Mainz, the Electorate of the Palatinate, and the Grand Duchy of Baden.

The castle is currently owned by Louis (Ludwig), Prince of Baden.

Above Zwingenberg Castle are the remains of Fürstenstein Castle.
