= Schwarzbach (Elsenz) =

River in Baden-Württemberg, Germany

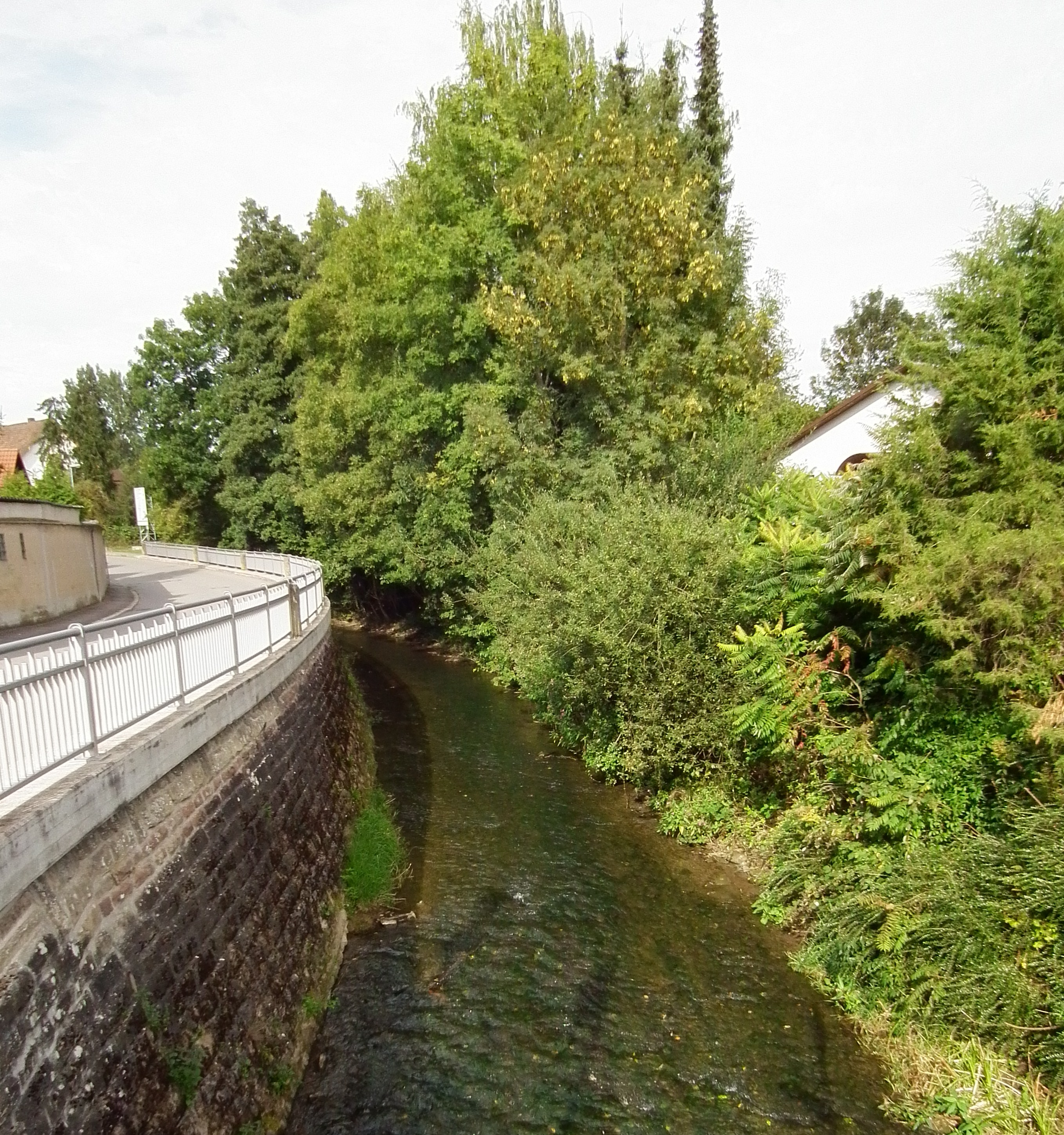

Location
- Country: Germany
- State: Baden-Württemberg

Physical characteristics
- Mouth
  - location: Elsenz
  - coordinates: 49.3141°N 8.8223°E
- Length: 27.7 km (17.2 mi)

Basin features
- Progression: Elsenz→ Neckar→ Rhine→ North Sea

Schwarzbach (German pronunciation: [ˈʃvaʁtsˌbax]) is a river of Baden-Württemberg, Germany. It flows into the Elsenz in Meckesheim.

== See also ==
- List of rivers of Baden-Württemberg
