= Fahrenbach =

- Municipality
- Coat of arms

- Location of Fahrenbach within Neckar-Odenwald-Kreis district
- Interactive map of Fahrenbach
- Location within Germany Location within Baden-Württemberg
- Coordinates: 49°25′51″N 9°09′00″E
- Country: Germany
- State: Baden-Württemberg
- Admin. region: Karlsruhe
- District: Neckar-Odenwald-Kreis
- Subdivisions: 3

Government
  - Mayor (2016–24): Jens Stefan Wittmann (CDU)

Area
  - Total: 16.42 km^{2} (6.34 sq mi)
- Elevation: 315 m (1,033 ft)

Population (2025-12-31)
  - Total: 2,617
  - Density: 159.4/km^{2} (412.8/sq mi)
- Time zone: UTC+01:00 (CET)
  - Summer (DST): UTC+02:00 (CEST)
- Postal codes: 74864
- Dialling codes: 06267
- Vehicle registration: MOS, BCH
- Website: www.fahrenbach.de

Fahrenbach is a town in the district of Neckar-Odenwald-Kreis, in Baden-Württemberg, Germany.

== Administration ==
Fahrenbach is made up of three subdivisions:

- Fahrenbach, population 1335
- Robern, population 699
- Trienz, population 808
