= Charles Fehrenbach =

Charles Fehrenbach may refer to:

- Charles Fehrenbach (astronomer) (1914–2008), French astronomer
- Charles Fehrenbach (priest) (1909–2006), American Redemptorist (Catholic) author of the book Mary Day by Day
