= Neckar-Odenwald-Kreis =

Coordinates: 49°29′N 9°17′E

- District
- Flag Coat of arms
- Country: Germany
- State: Baden-Württemberg
- Adm. region: Karlsruhe
- Capital: Mosbach (Baden)

Government
  - District admin.: Achim Brötel (CDU)

Area
  - Total: 1,126.29 km^{2} (434.86 sq mi)

Population (31 December 2022)
  - Total: 145,493
  - Density: 130/km^{2} (330/sq mi)
- Time zone: UTC+01:00 (CET)
  - Summer (DST): UTC+02:00 (CEST)
- Vehicle registration: MOS, BCH
- Website: http://www.neckar-odenwald-kreis.de

Neckar-Odenwald-Kreis is a Landkreis (district) in the north of Baden-Württemberg, Germany. Neighboring districts are (from east clockwise) Main-Tauber-Kreis, Hohenlohe-Kreis, Heilbronn, Rhein-Neckar-Kreis, Odenwaldkreis (Hesse) and Landkreis Miltenberg (Bavaria). The district is part of the Rhine-Neckar Metropolitan Region.

== History ==
The district was created in 1973 by merging the previous districts Buchen and Mosbach. At first it was named Odenwaldkreis, however to avoid confusion with the neighboring district in Hesse with the same name it was renamed in 1974 to be Neckar-Odenwald-Kreis.

== Geography ==
As the name already suggests the district is located in the Odenwald mountains, with the highest elevation at the Katzenbuckel (626 m) near Waldbrunn in the west of the district. The main river of the district is the Neckar.

== Coat of arms ==
The district's coat of arms might be described thus: Per pale dexter bendy lozengy argent and azure, sinister gules a wheel spoked of six argent. The coat of arms shows the symbols of the two historical rulers of the district. On the dexter (armsbearer’s right, viewer’s left) side is the blue and white "bendy lozengy" (that is, slanted diamond shapes) of the Wittelsbach family as owners of the Electorate of the Palatinate; on the sinister (armsbearer’s left, viewer’s right) side is the Wheel of Mainz, a symbol of the old Electorate of Mainz.

== Municipalities ==
Clickable map of towns and municipalities in the district

Towns	Communities
1. Adelsheim; 2. Buchen (with 2 unofficial district offices); 3. Mosbach (seat of the official district office); 4. Osterburken; 5. Ravenstein; 6. Walldürn	1. Aglasterhausen; 2. Billigheim; 3. Binau; 4. Elztal; 5. Fahrenbach; 6. Hardheim; 7. Haßmersheim; 8. Höpfingen; 9. Hüffenhardt; 10. Limbach; 11. Mudau; 12. Neckargerach; 13. Neckarzimmern; 14. Neunkirchen; 15. Obrigheim; 16. Rosenberg (Baden); 17. Schefflenz; 18. Schwarzach; 19. Seckach; 20. Waldbrunn; 21. Zwingenberg (Baden)
Administrative districts	1. Aglasterhausen; 2. Billigheim; 3. Binau; 4. Elztal; 5. Fahrenbach; 6. Hardheim; 7. Haßmersheim; 8. Höpfingen; 9. Hüffenhardt; 10. Limbach; 11. Mudau; 12. Neckargerach; 13. Neckarzimmern; 14. Neunkirchen; 15. Obrigheim; 16. Rosenberg (Baden); 17. Schefflenz; 18. Schwarzach; 19. Seckach; 20. Waldbrunn; 21. Zwingenberg (Baden)
1. Hardheim-Walldürn; 2. Haßmersheim; 3. Kleiner Odenwald; 4. Limbach; 5. Mosbach; 6. Neckargerach-Waldbrunn; 7. Osterburken; 8. Schefflenztal; 9. Seckachtal	1. Aglasterhausen; 2. Billigheim; 3. Binau; 4. Elztal; 5. Fahrenbach; 6. Hardheim; 7. Haßmersheim; 8. Höpfingen; 9. Hüffenhardt; 10. Limbach; 11. Mudau; 12. Neckargerach; 13. Neckarzimmern; 14. Neunkirchen; 15. Obrigheim; 16. Rosenberg (Baden); 17. Schefflenz; 18. Schwarzach; 19. Seckach; 20. Waldbrunn; 21. Zwingenberg (Baden)
