= Neunkirchen, Baden-Württemberg =

Neunkirchen
- Municipality
- Coat of arms

- Location of Neunkirchen within Neckar-Odenwald-Kreis district
- Interactive map of Neunkirchen
- Location within Germany Location within Baden-Württemberg
- Coordinates: 49°23′21″N 9°00′29″E
- Country: Germany
- State: Baden-Württemberg
- Admin. region: Karlsruhe
- District: Neckar-Odenwald-Kreis
- Subdivisions: 2

Government
  - Mayor (2016–24): Bernhard Knörzer

Area
  - Total: 15.92 km^{2} (6.15 sq mi)
- Elevation: 316 m (1,037 ft)

Population (2025-12-31)
  - Total: 1,829
  - Density: 114.9/km^{2} (297.6/sq mi)
- Time zone: UTC+01:00 (CET)
  - Summer (DST): UTC+02:00 (CEST)
- Postal codes: 74867
- Dialling codes: 06262
- Vehicle registration: MOS, BCH
- Website: www.neunkirchen-baden.de

Neunkirchen (German: [ˈnɔʏnkɪʁçn̩]) is a municipality in the district of Neckar-Odenwald-Kreis, in Baden-Württemberg, Germany. It is located near Mosbach.

== Demographics ==
Population development:

Year	Inhabitants
1990	1,624
2001	1,775
2011	1,822
2021	1,853

View chart definition.

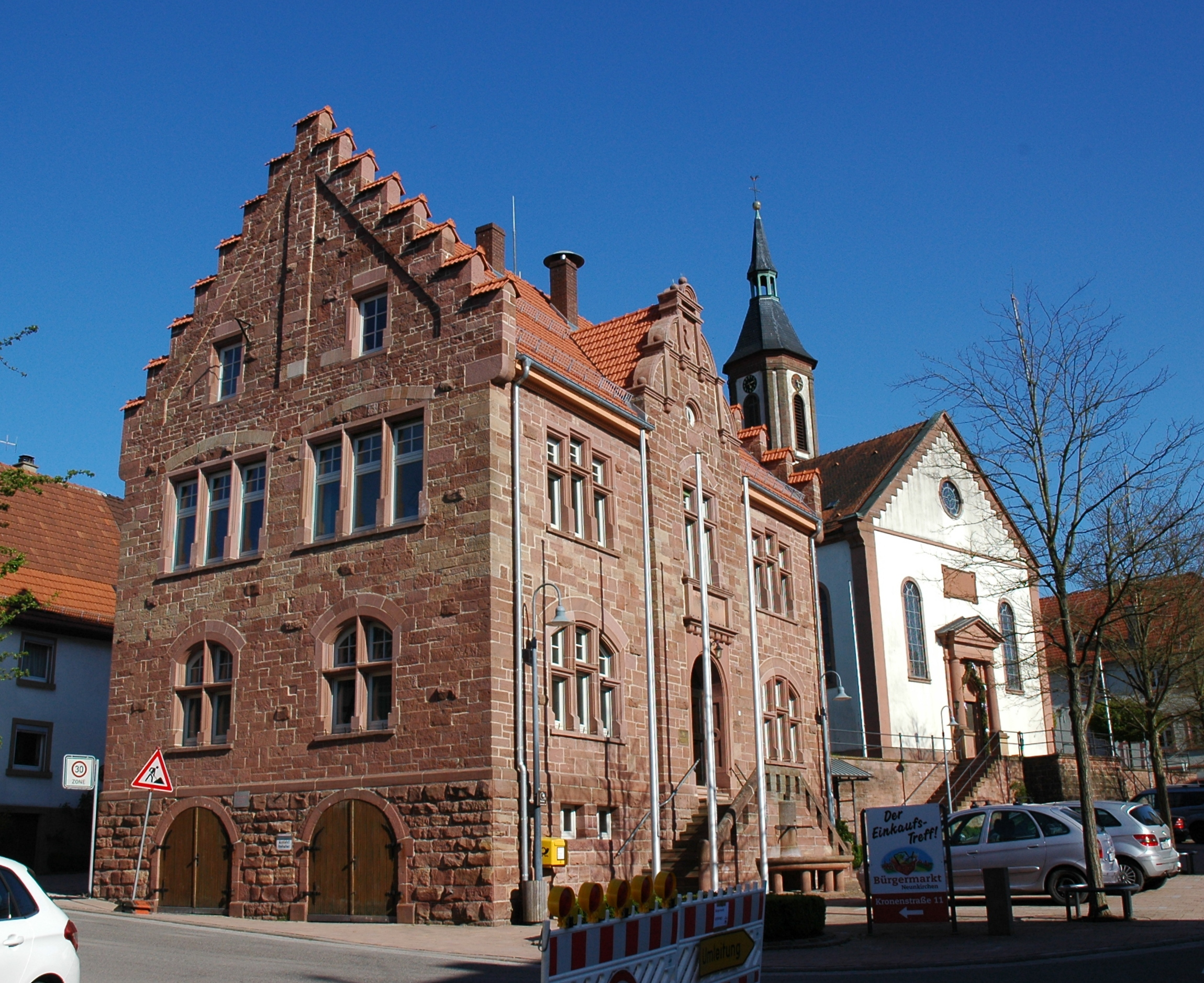
Neunkirchen Town hall and protestant church
