= Obrigheim =

- Municipality
- Coat of arms

- Location of Obrigheim within Neckar-Odenwald-Kreis district
- Interactive map of Obrigheim
- Location within Germany Location within Baden-Württemberg
- Coordinates: 49°21′8″N 9°5′34″E
- Country: Germany
- State: Baden-Württemberg
- Admin. region: Karlsruhe
- District: Neckar-Odenwald-Kreis
- Subdivisions: 3

Government
  - Mayor (2022–30): Achim Walter (FDP)

Area
  - Total: 24.27 km^{2} (9.37 sq mi)
- Elevation: 147 m (482 ft)

Population (2025-12-31)
  - Total: 5,377
  - Density: 221.5/km^{2} (573.8/sq mi)
- Time zone: UTC+01:00 (CET)
  - Summer (DST): UTC+02:00 (CEST)
- Postal codes: 74847
- Dialling codes: 06261, 06262
- Vehicle registration: MOS, BCH
- Website: www.obrigheim.de

Obrigheim (German pronunciation: [ˈoːbʁɪçˌhaɪm]; South Franconian: Owweringe) is a town in the district of Neckar-Odenwald-Kreis, in Baden-Württemberg, Germany.

It is the location of the Obrigheim Nuclear Power Plant.

== History ==
The concentration camp Neckarelz was from March 1944 to March 1945 an extension of the concentration camp Natzweiler-Struthof. Thousands of forced workers and KZ-prisoners had to build tunnels in the nearby mountains.

== Demographics ==
Population development:

Year	Inhabitants
1990	5,302
2001	5,375
2011	5,160
2021	5,407

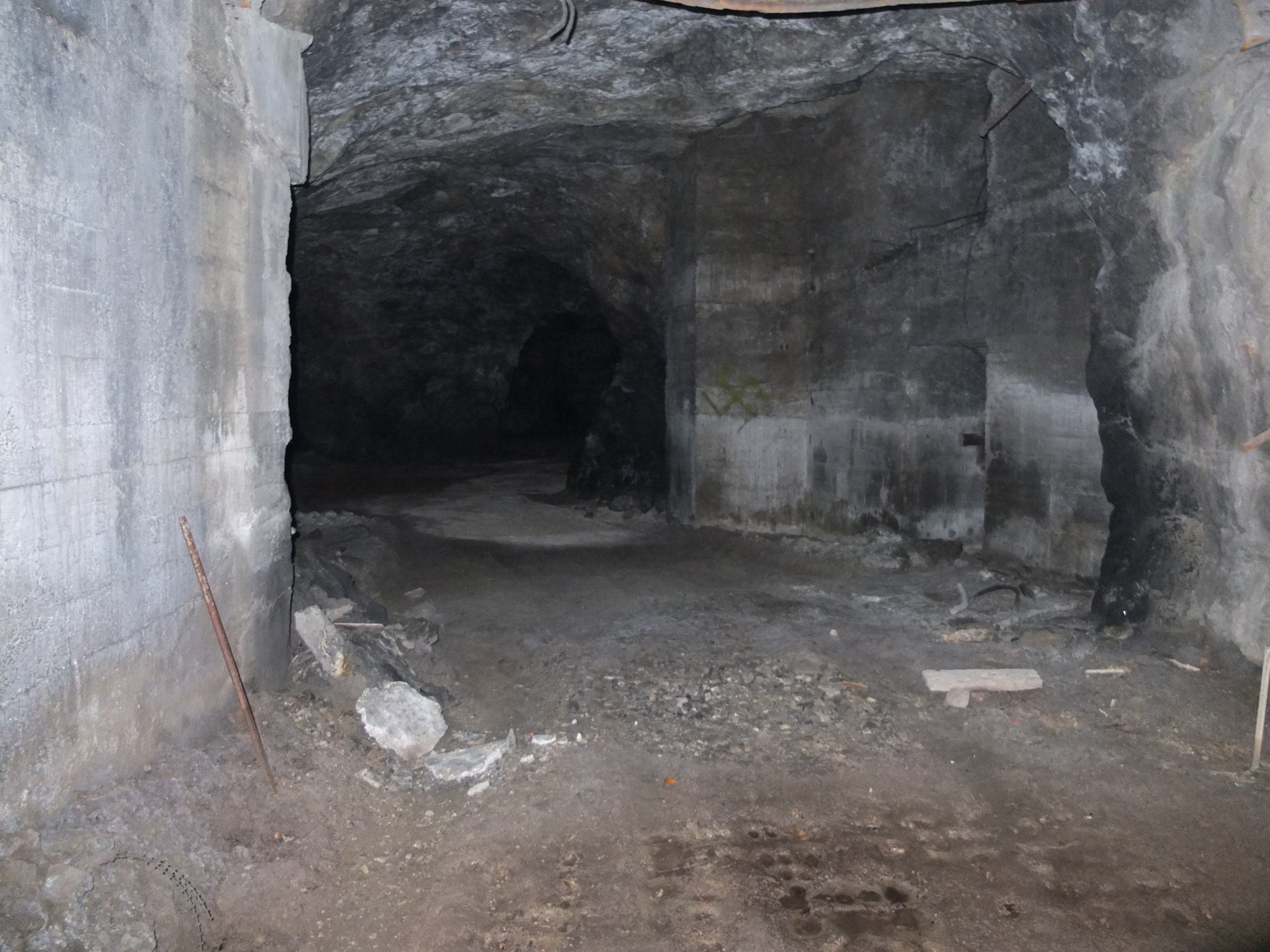
Shaft Brasse in 2012

== Mayors ==
In October 2014 Achim Walter (FDP) was elected the new mayor. He is the successor of Roland Lauer (CDU), he was 24 years in office.
