= Elsenz =

River of Baden-Württemberg, Germany

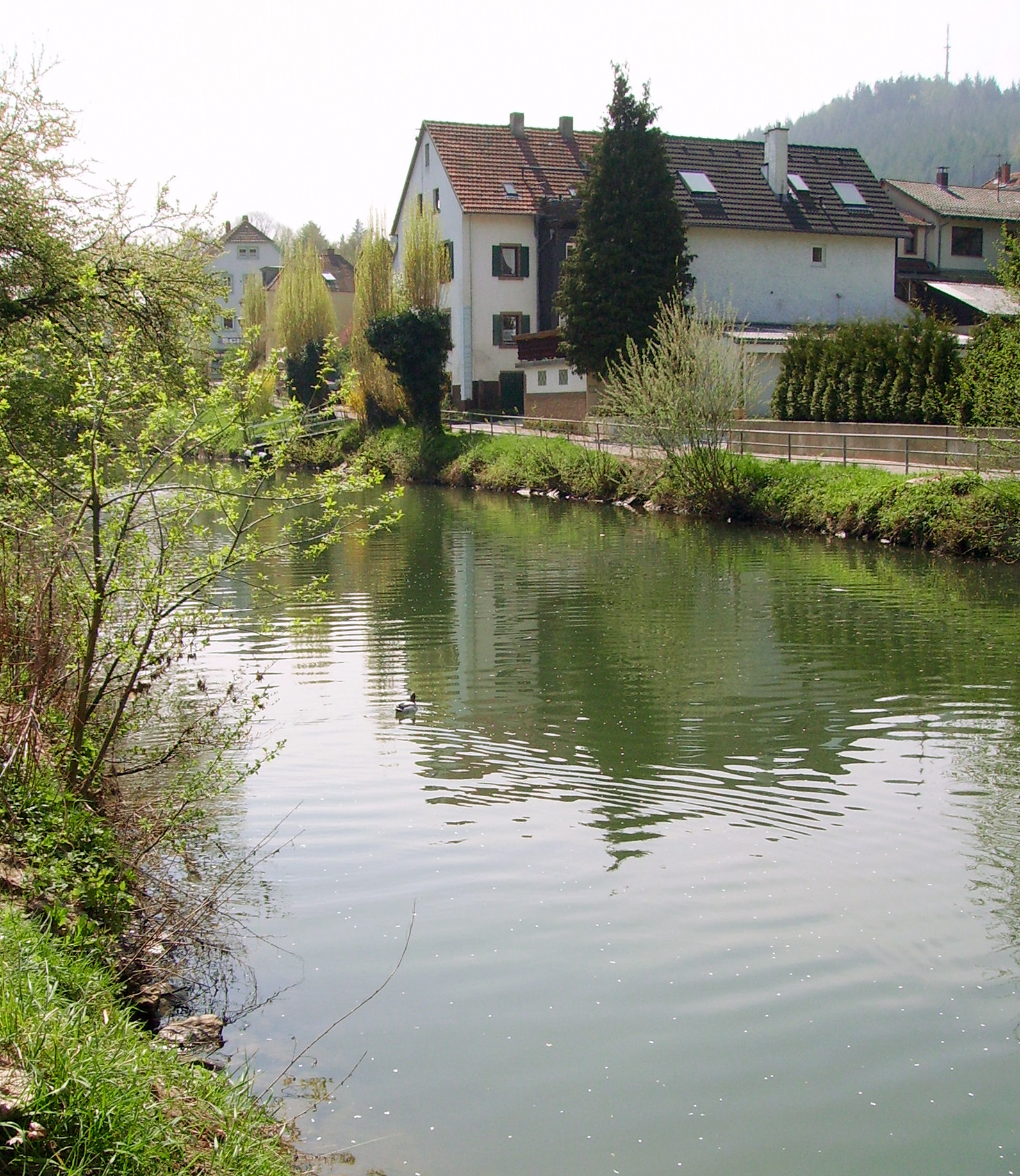

Location
- Country: Germany
- State: Baden-Württemberg

Physical characteristics
- Mouth
  - location: Neckar
  - coordinates: 49.3961°N 8.7960°E
- Length: 53.2 km (33.1 mi)
- Basin size: 543 km^{2} (210 sq mi)

Basin features
- Progression: Neckar→ Rhine→ North Sea

Elsenz (German pronunciation: [ˈɛlzɛnt͡s]) is a river of Baden-Württemberg, Germany; it has its origins in Lake Elsenzsee and the Kreuzberghof Forest, passing through Sinsheim and flowing into the Neckar in Neckargemünd.

== See also ==
- List of rivers of Baden-Württemberg
