= Kirchheim (Unterfranken) station =

Railway station in Germany

Kirchheim (Unterfranken)
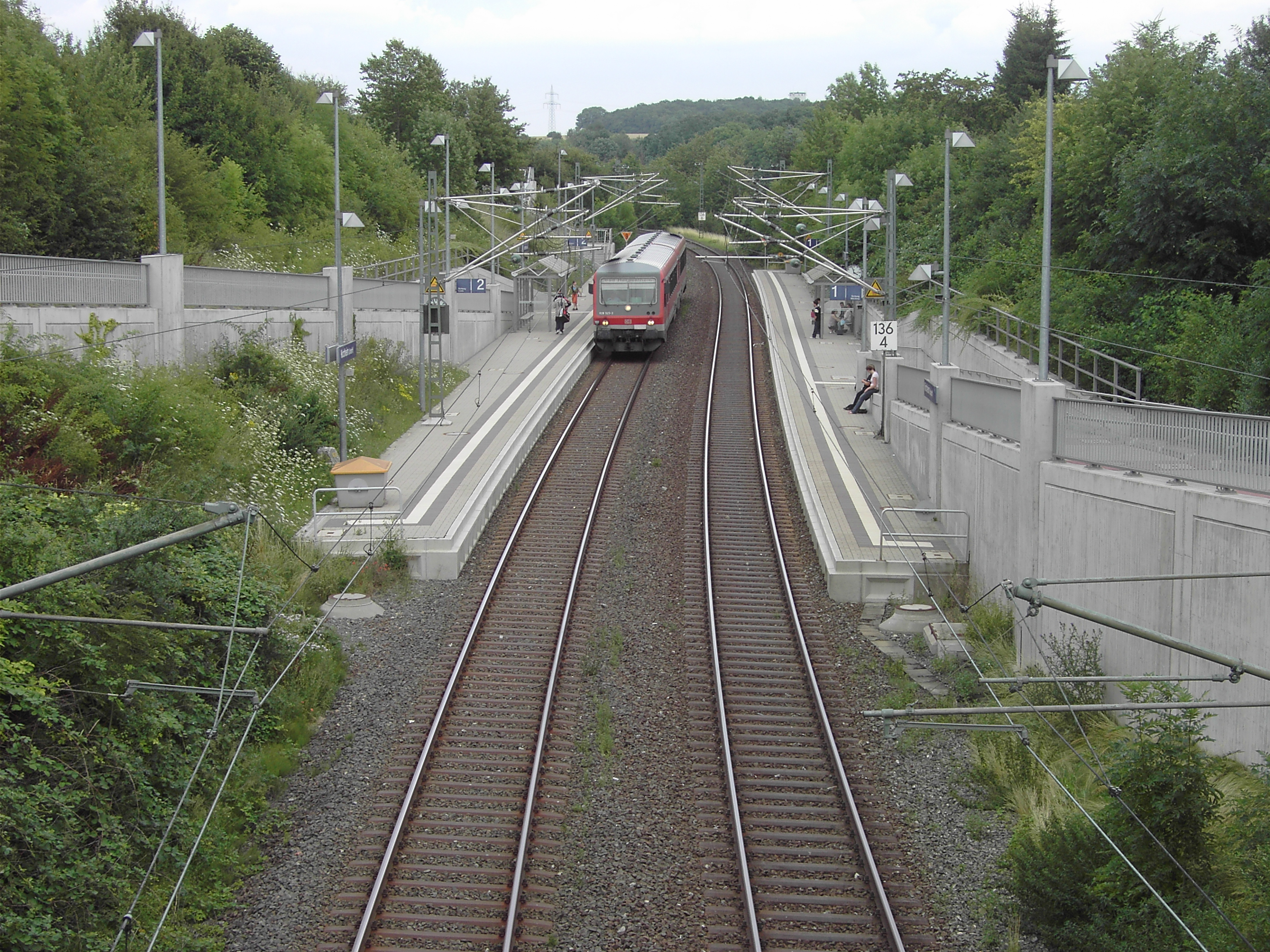
- 2005

General information
- Location: Kleinrinderfelder Straße/Carl-Schilling-Straße; 97268 Kirchheim; Bavaria; Germany
- Coordinates: 49°39′26″N 9°51′30″E
- Elevation: 285 m (935 ft)
- Owner: DB Netz
- Operator: DB Station&Service
- Lines: Franconia Railway (KBS 780)
- Platforms: 2 side platforms
- Tracks: 2
- Train operators: Westfrankenbahn

Other information
- Station code: 3197
- DS100 code: TKU
- IBNR: 8003284
- Category: 6
- Fare zone: NVM: A/224; VRN: 643 (NVM transitional zone)
- Website: www.bahnhof.de

Services
Preceding station	DB Regio Bayern	Following station
Geroldshausen towards Würzburg Hbf	RB 85	Gaubüttelbrunn towards Osterburken
Preceding station		Following station
Geroldshausen towards Würzburg Hbf	RB 8	Gaubüttelbrunn towards Lauda
Location
- Location within Bavaria

Kirchheim (Unterfranken) station is a railway station in the municipality of Kirchheim, located in the Würzburg district in Bavaria, Germany.
