= Vorbach (disambiguation) =

Vorbach is a municipality in Bavaria, Germany.

Vorbach may also refer to:

- Vorbach (Tauber, Rothenburg ob der Tauber), a river of Baden-Württemberg and of Bavaria, Germany, tributary of the Tauber near Rothenburg ob der Tauber
- Vorbach (Tauber, Weikersheim), a river of Baden-Württemberg, Germany, tributary of the Tauber at Weikersheim
- a village of Ebern, a town in Bavaria, Germany
