= Herrgottsbach =

River in Germany

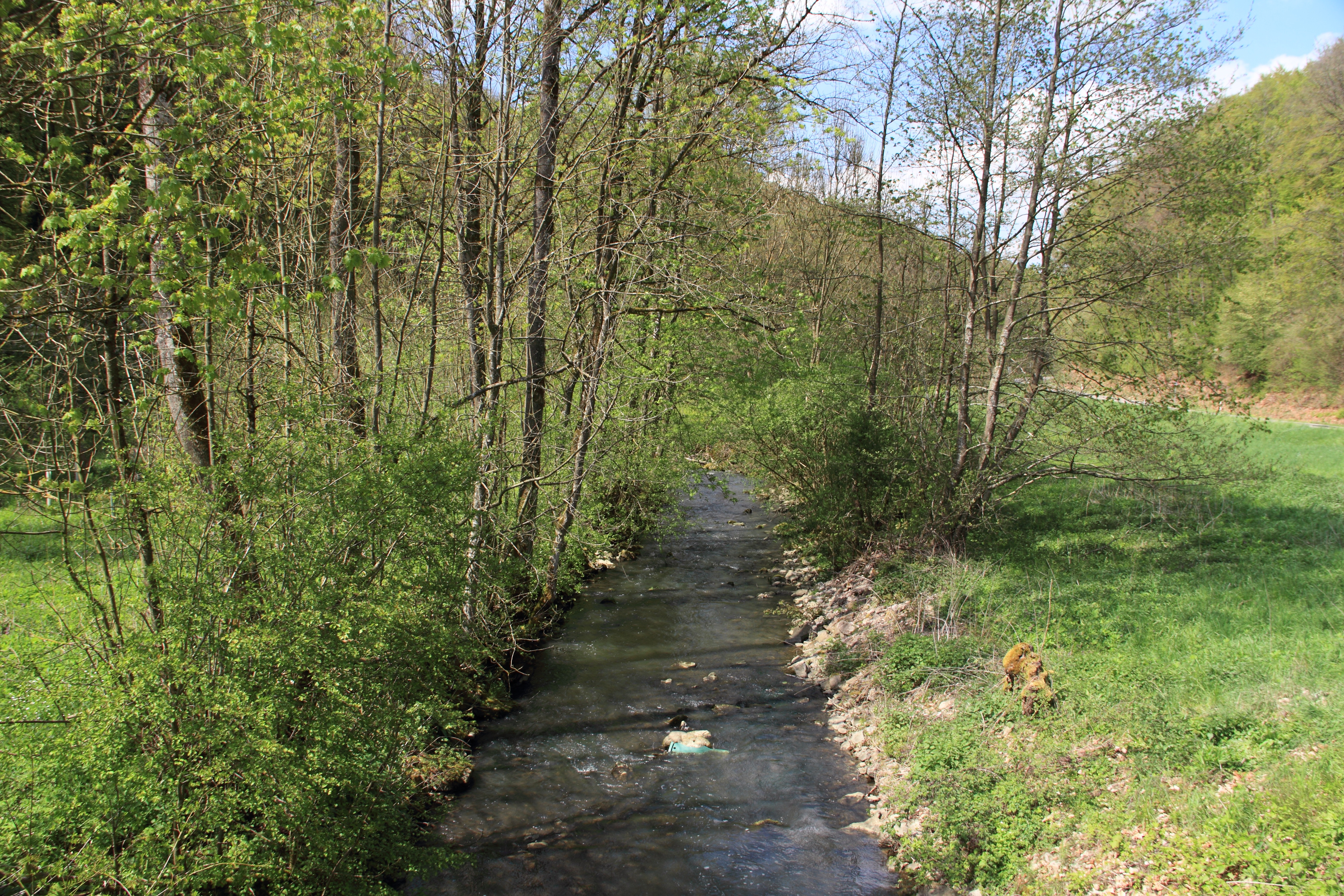

Location
- Country: Germany
- State: Baden-Württemberg

Physical characteristics
- Mouth
  - location: Tauber
  - coordinates: 49.4692°N 10.0325°E
- Length: 14.1 km (8.8 mi)

Basin features
- Progression: Tauber→ Main→ Rhine→ North Sea

Herrgottsbach (in its upper course also: Rimbach) is a river of Baden-Württemberg, Germany. It flows into the Tauber in Creglingen.

== See also ==
- List of rivers of Baden-Württemberg
