= Lauda station =

Railway station in Lauda-Königshofen, Germany

Lauda
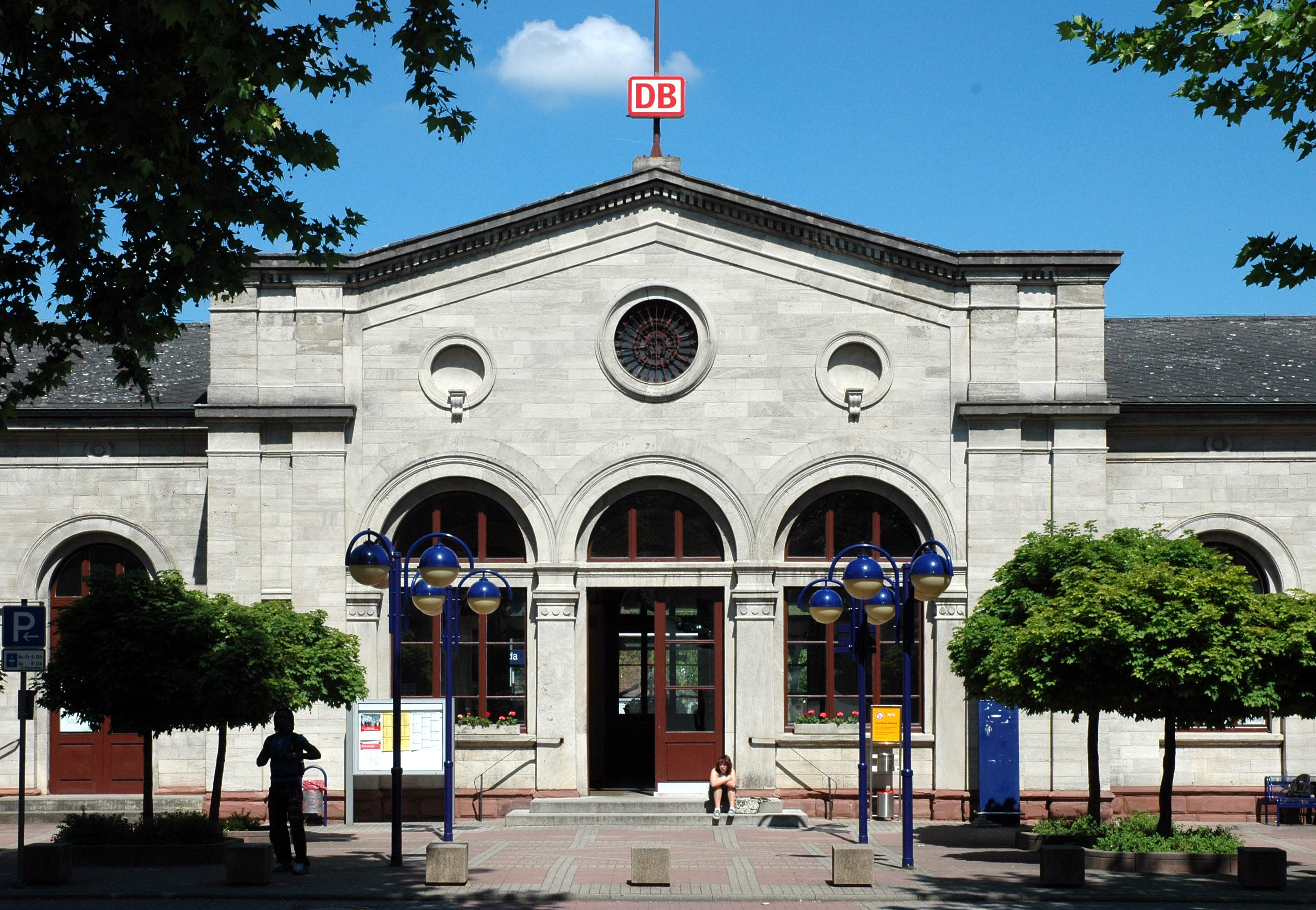

General information
- Location: Bahnhofstr. 23, Lauda-Königshofen, Baden-Württemberg; Germany
- Coordinates: 49°33′55″N 9°42′34″E
- Owner: Deutsche Bahn
- Operator: DB Netz; DB Station&Service
- Lines: Franconia Railway (KBS 780); Tauber Valley Railway (KBS 782)
- Platforms: 4

Construction
- Accessible: Yes

Other information
- Station code: n/a
- DS100 code: TL
- IBNR: 8000221
- Category: 4
- Fare zone: VRN: 6231
- Website: www.bahnhof.de

History
- Opened: 1 November 1866

Services
Preceding station		Following station
Osterburken towards Stuttgart Hbf	RE 8	Würzburg Hbf Terminus
Terminus	RB 8	Gerlachsheim towards Würzburg Hbf
Preceding station	DB Regio Bayern	Following station
Gerlachsheim towards Würzburg Hbf	RB 85	Königshofen (Baden) towards Osterburken
Preceding station		Following station
Tauberbischofsheim towards Aschaffenburg Hbf	RE 87	Königshofen (Baden) towards Crailsheim
Distelhausen towards Wertheim	RB 88	Königshofen (Baden) towards Crailsheim
Location

Lauda station is a junction station in the town of Lauda-Königshofen in the German state of Baden-Württemberg, where the northern section of the Tauber Valley Railway branches from the Franconia Railway. Lauda station is classified by Deutsche Bahn as a category 5 station.

== Location ==
Lauda station is located in the town of Lauda-Königshofen, on the eastern edge of Lauda. To its east it is bordered by an industrial area and Tauberstraße (street), which runs parallel with the Tauber river. Bahnhofstraße runs to the west of the station and Inselstraße runs through a tunnel under the tracks north of railway property.

Another smaller station is located in the Königshofen district, where the southern part of the Tauber Valley Railway joins the Franconia Railway.

== History ==
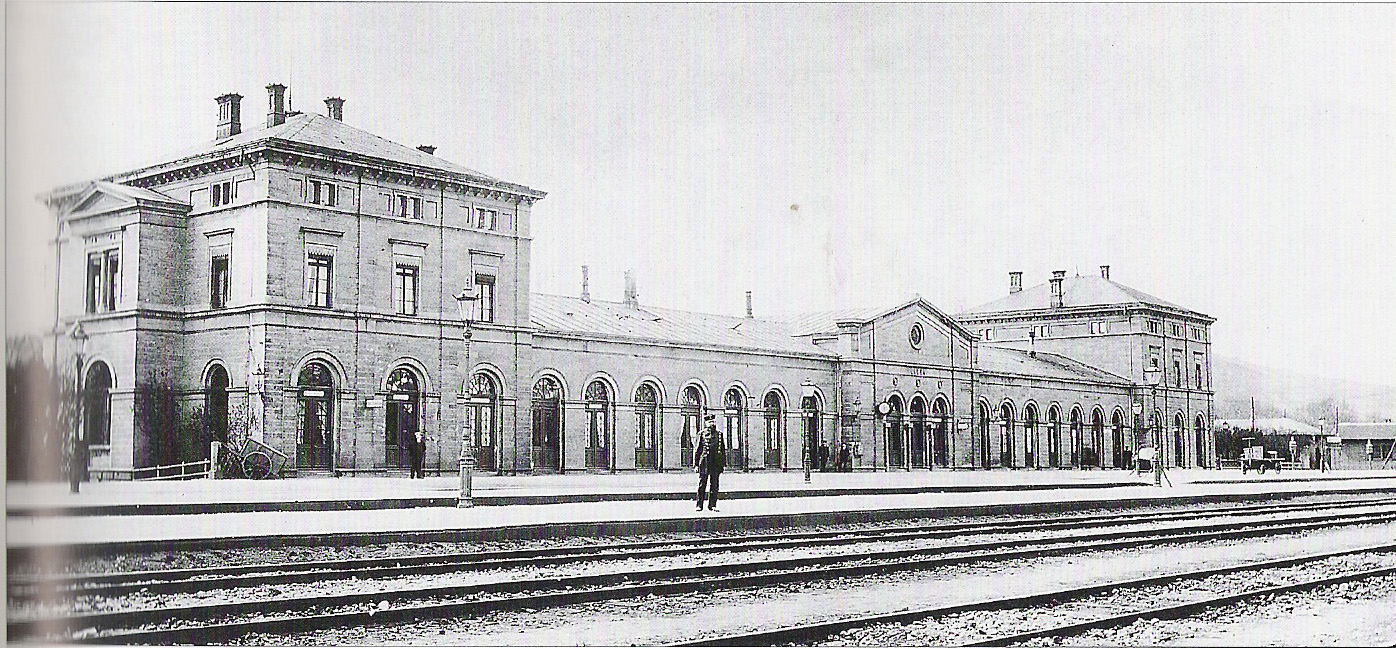
Station in 1871

The initial plans for the Odenwald Railway (Odenwaldbahn) from Heidelberg to Würzburg envisaged no station at its present location, it was originally conceived during the planning of the Tauber Valley Railway. On 1 November 1866, the station, which would serve as a point of transfer between the two lines, opened with the Odenwald Railway. The station was initially completed on 1 March 1866 with a temporary entrance building. The current building was opened in 1872. The first section of the Tauber Valley Railway was opened to Hochhausen on 10 October 1867, which made Lauda a railway junction.

In 1906, an office building was built next to the entrance building, which was used after 1929 by Ausbesserungswerk Lauda (rail vehicle repair shop).

The station was established because of its convenient location at a rail junction. In 1938, about 1000 people worked on the railway in Lauda, out of a population of about 3000. The population of the town had doubled in 80 years. The district to the west of the station, which had become known as Bahnhofsstadt ("station town"), had become the second centre of the town.

=== World War II ===
As a result of its function as a railway junction, Lauda and its surroundings were repeatedly bombed in Allied air raids. A first attack by a single bomber in April 1942 was not without consequences. From October 1944 to March 1945 there were four attacks by bombers. On 15 October 1944, a moving express train was shot at, the Tauber bridge suffered minor damage and 6 to 8 locomotives were disabled by gunshots. The signal and telephone lines suffered great damage. On 9 November 1944, the Allies carried out the most comprehensive attack with twelve fighter-bombers. 30 bombs dropped all missed their targets, but a subsequent attack with on-board weapons damaged the water towers, engine shed, signal boxes and locomotives. 13 locomotives were made unusable, but nobody was hurt. Another attack on 30 November of that year hit two moving passenger trains, causing 15 fatalities. Afterwards the station was attacked with gun fire. The last attack took place on the morning of 24 March 1945: ten bombers attacked the southern part of the station. Here a military train with Russian prisoners of war was hit hard by cluster bombs and strafing. 43 prisoners were killed and there were many injuries. The track and signaling systems at the southern end of the station were severely damaged and more locomotives were made unusable. The station only returned to tentative operations in the evening of the same day.

The occupation of the city by U.S. troops caused only minor damage to the station. Railwaymen succeeded in preventing the Wehrmacht from demolishing the Tauber bridge. The manager of the railway depot ordered the demolition of all local facilities before he disappeared, but his deputy prevented the implementation of the plan. Since the Odenwald Railway was an important supply route for the U.S. occupation forces, U.S. troops occupied the station immediately. The employees of Lauda station brought it back into regular service on 10 June 1945.

=== After 1945 ===
Until the 1970s there were five Deutsche Bundesbahn departments in Lauda: railway station, signalling, rail track maintenance, rail vehicle repair shop and rail operations. Thereafter, these services were closed down in the station and the vacated space was converted into offices. In 1988, these department employed about 480 people in Lauda.

The former office building of Lauda station is now a subsidiary of the railway construction company Strabag Rail, a subsidiary of Strabag.

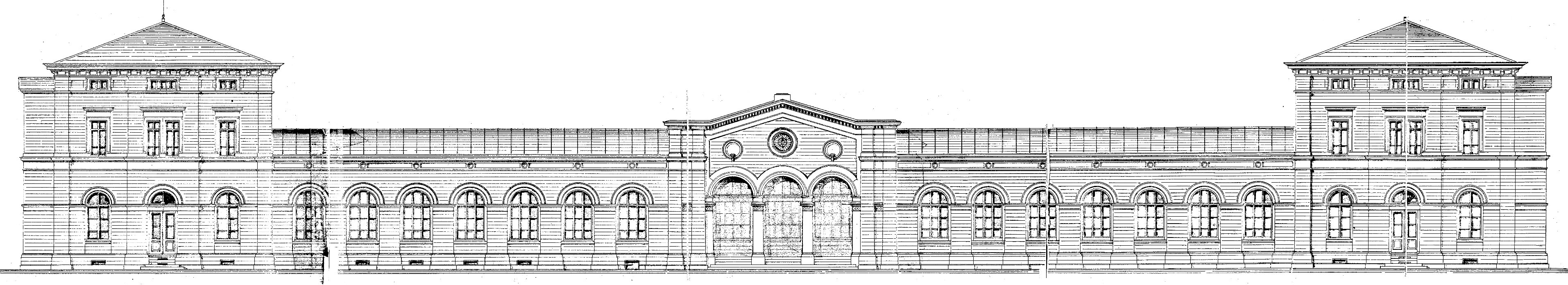
Station building of 1872, elevation on the town side

== Platform data ==
The station has four platform tracks with a platform height of 32 cm each:

- Track 1: platform length: 327 m
- Track 2: platform length: 451 m
- Track 3: platform length: 331 m
- Track 4: platform length: 331 m

Track 1 is located next to the station building, other platform are between tracks 1 and 2 as well as between 3 and 4.

== Passenger services ==
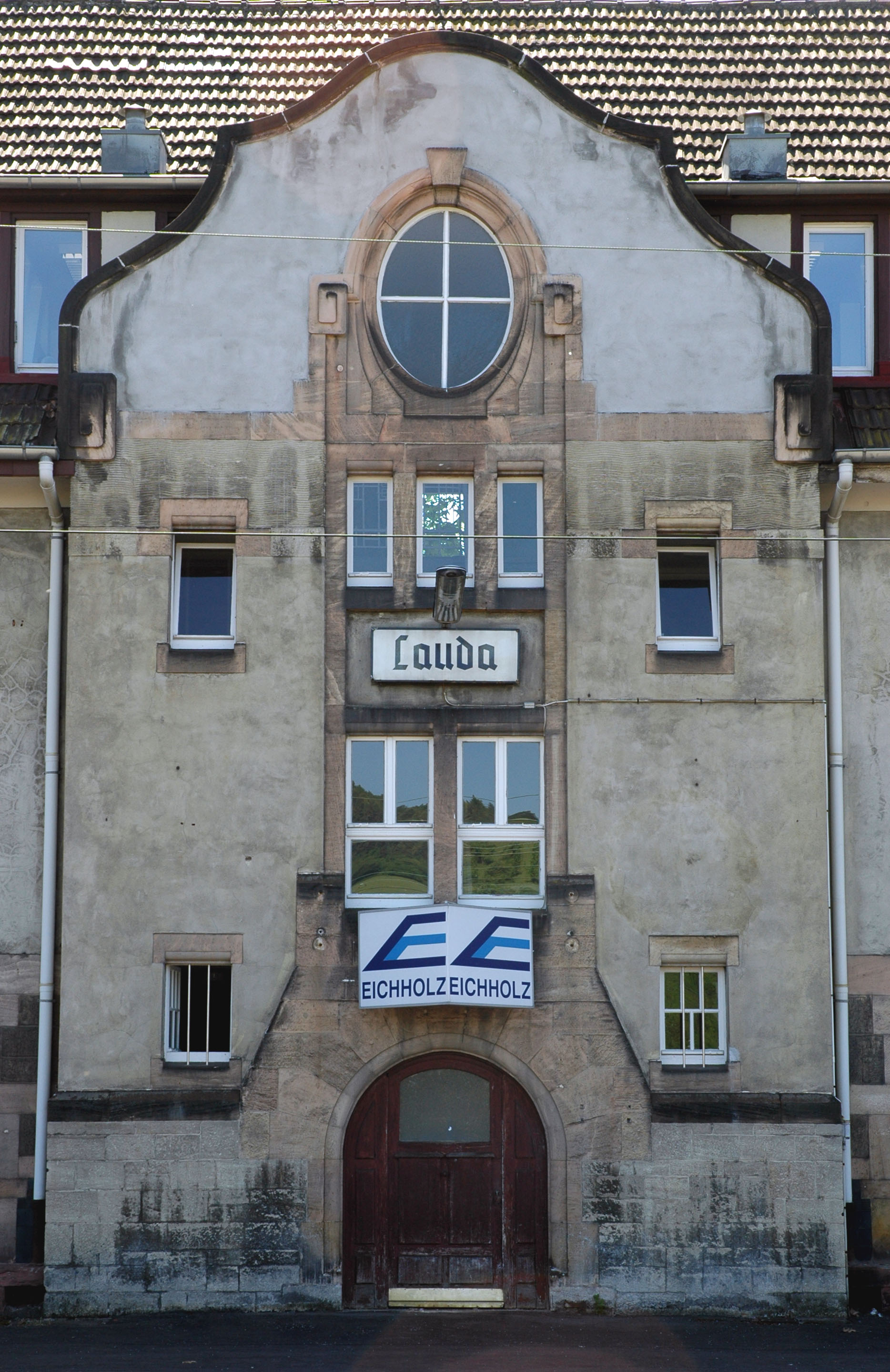
Former office building, which has a central projection (May 2007)

Being on the Odenwald Railway and the Tauber Valley Railway, Lauda was for decades a stop for long-distance trains. In the peak years, there were ten express services daily, mainly of the long routes between Berlin and Stuttgart and between the Palatinate and Franconia. In 1886, the first direct connection ran to Berlin. Up until the Second World War, changing destinations were added, some with through coaches, such as Metz, Leipzig, Paris, Carlsbad (now Karlovy Vary), Dresden, Breslau (now Wrocław), Milan and Naples. In the interwar period, Deutsche Reichsbahn through coaches ran from Berlin to Bad Mergentheim and back, with the coaches separated or attached in Lauda.

With the division of Germany and the associated displacement of the traffic flows, the Hamburg–Stuttgart route replaced the route to and from Berlin. In the 1960s and 1970s, Deutsche Bundesbahn (DB) operated through coaches on the Hamburg–Ulm route via the Tauber Valley Railway, with the coaches separated or attached in Lauda station. In 1991, DB opened the Mannheim–Stuttgart high-speed railway, creating additional capacity for north–south traffic. This meant that the Würzburg–Stuttgart route and thus Lauda station lost its high-quality passenger trains. The only exception was the Interregio service, Rennsteig from Erfurt to Stuttgart, which was discontinued in 2001.

=== Today ===
The station is served every two hours by Regional-Express services on the Würzburg–Stuttgart route. On this line, some additional services mean that there are sometimes services each hour. Regional-Express services also operate between Aschaffenburg and Crailsheim serving the station every two hours, this train has been branded as the Main-Tauber Express. In addition, the station is served by Regionalbahn several services on the Wertheim–Lauda route each day. Another Regionalbahn service runs hourly from Würzburg to Lauda, with most trains continuing to Bad Mergentheim and some trains continue to Crailsheim. This route has additional services in busy periods. Services as of 2023:

Service class	Route	Frequency
RE 8	Würzburg – Lauda – Osterburken – Friedrichshall – Heilbronn – Bietigheim-Bissingen – Stuttgart	Every two hours, sometimes hourly
RB 85	Würzburg – Lauda (– Osterburken)	Hourly; Lauda – Osterburken Mon-Fri only
RB 85	(Bad Mergentheim) – Lauda – Osterburken	Three train pairs on school days
RE 87	Aschaffenburg – Wertheim – Lauda – Bad Mergentheim – Crailsheim	Every two hours more trains in summer (Wertheim – Crailsheim)
RB 88	Wertheim – Tauberbischofsheim – Lauda – Bad Mergentheim – Crailsheim	Every two hours
RB 88	Tauberbischofsheim – Lauda – Bad Mergentheim	Hourly (Mon–Fri afternoons)

== Locomotive depot ==
The Grand Duchy of Baden State Railways (Großherzoglich Badische Staatseisenbahnen or G.Bad.St.E.) and its successor organisations in the days of steam traction based locomotive operations on the Odenwald Railway and its branch lines in the northeast of Baden in Lauda.

In 1866, with the extension of Odenwald Railway from Mosbach to Würzburg, the G.Bad.St.E. established a locomotive depot in Lauda and built this up to the autumn of 1868 to form a complete operations workshop (Bahnbetriebswerk), which as a result of its elaborate infrastructure was compared to the entrance building. Yet, in 1866, a Baden locomotive depot was established in Würzburg, which had its workshop at Lauda. With the administrative reorganization of the northern Baden railways in 1937, the Lauda depot was designated by the Reichsbahn rollingstock office Heilbronn as coming under the railway division (Reichsbahndirektion) of Stuttgart.

From the 1910s to the 1950s, 40–50 locomotives were always stationed in Lauda, for earlier years there is no stationing data. Until 1959, the stock declined to 27 locomotives and included classes 38, 39, 50 and 64. On 1 April 1962, mainline steam locomotive operations at Heilbronn depot ended with the retirement of the class 64 locomotives. Then only small locomotives were stationed in Lauda. On 1 February 1976 was the Lauda depot was converted into a branch of the Heilbronn depot.
