= Tauber Valley Railway =

Standard gauge railway in Germany

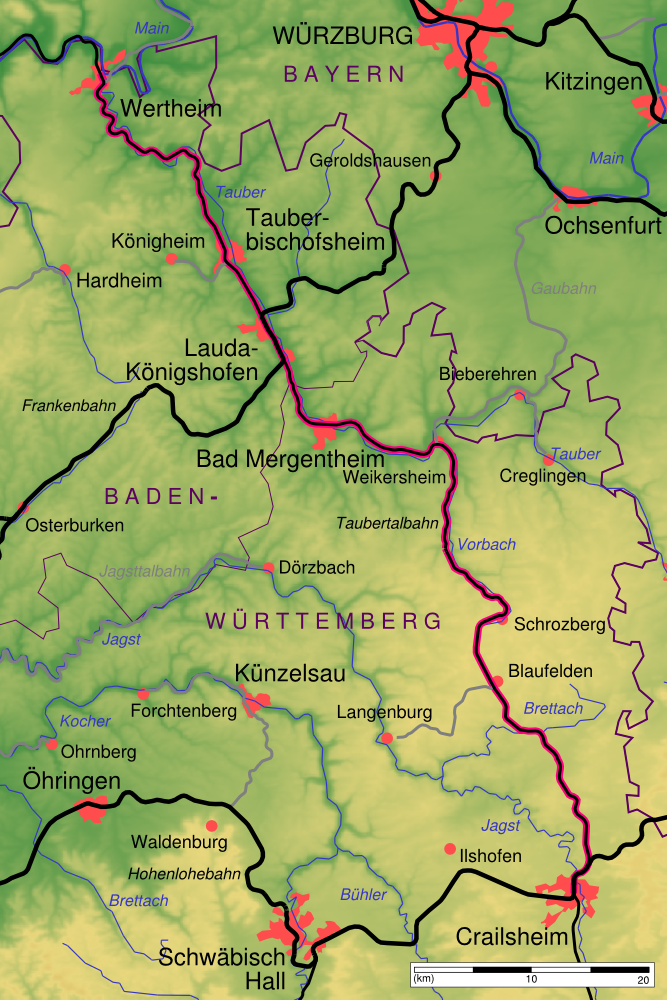

Overview
- Native name: Taubertalbahn
- Status: Operational
- Owner: Deutsche Bahn
- Line number: 4953 (Crailsheim – Bad Mergentheim); 4922 (Königshofen – Bad Mergentheim); 4120 (Neckarelz – Heidingsfeld); 4920 (Lauda – Wertheim)
- Locale: Baden-Württemberg, Germany
- Termini: Crailsheim; Wertheim
- Stations: 24

Service
- Type: Heavy rail, Passenger/freight rail Regional rail
- Route number: 782
- Operator: DB Bahn

History
- Opened: 23 October 1869

Technical
- Line length: 100.3 km (62.3 mi)
- Num of tracks: Single track
- Track gauge: 1,435 mm (4 ft 8 1/2 in) standard gauge
- Operating speed: 100 km/h (62 mph)

The Tauber Valley Railway (German: Taubertalbahn) is a single-tracked, unelectrified, standard gauge railway between Wertheim and Crailsheim in the state of Baden-Württemberg in southern Germany. It runs alongside the Tauber to Weikersheim, then along the Vorbach and Blaubach rivers. It is recorded in the timetable as route no. 782. Until 9 December 2006 it had been route no. 788.

== History ==
After the completion of surveys of the area in 1858, work for the Tauber Valley Railway started in 1864 with the survey of the route. Actual construction of the Tauber Valley Railway began in October 1866 on the Lauda–Wertheim section and in August 1868 construction began on the Mergentheim–Crailsheim section, which cost almost 16 million gulden. The first section between Lauda and Hochhausen was completed in 1867 and the rest of the line was completed a year later. On 23 October 1869, operations on the Lauda–Mergentheim and the Mergentheim–Crailsheim sections were officially inaugurated by officials of the governments of the Kingdom of Württemberg and Grand Duchy of Baden. On that day, it became possible to travel for the first time all the way from Wertheim to Crailsheim. The Tauber Valley Railway from the beginning was of a great importance for travelling for the “cure” in Bad Mergentheim. In the summer of 1939, through coaches ran from Berlin to Bad Mergentheim. During the Second World War, the Tauber Valley Railway was spared from air raids, with the exception of minor destruction in Lauda and Crailsheim. In the 1950s, an express train ran between Frankfurt and Ulm on the Tauber Valley Railway. Through coaches ran again to Bad Mergentheim from Hamburg and Duisburg as well as from Dortmund after 1968. These services ended in 1988 or 1989.

== Current situation ==
Deutsche Bahn has threatened to close the Tauber Valley Railway several times, but this has not come to pass. In 2003 extensive renovation and modernisation work started on the line, including the laying of new tracks on part of the line, the renewal of level crossings, the cleaning of the track bed and the restoration of a damaged railway embankment near Lauda. These measures cost about €15 million. Since October 2009, the Niederstetten tunnel has been extensively renovated and the section between Schrozberg and Niederstetten has been overhauled. Since 1 January 2006, the DB subsidiary Westfrankenbahn has maintained the railway infrastructure as well as operated services on the Tauber Valley Railway.

=== Passengers ===
As a result of cycling tourism in the Tauber Valley and the neighbouring Main Valley, many cyclists use trains on the line. So the Main Valley Railway and the Tauber Valley Railway are served from March to October by special carriages for bicycle transportation. On the second Sunday in August there is a car-free Sunday in the Tauber Valley. On this day the Tauber Valley road is closed to traffic and it used only by bicycles and inline skaters. Special trains operate on the Tauber Valley Railway on that day with discounted tickets and excellent accommodation for bicycles, which is well used.

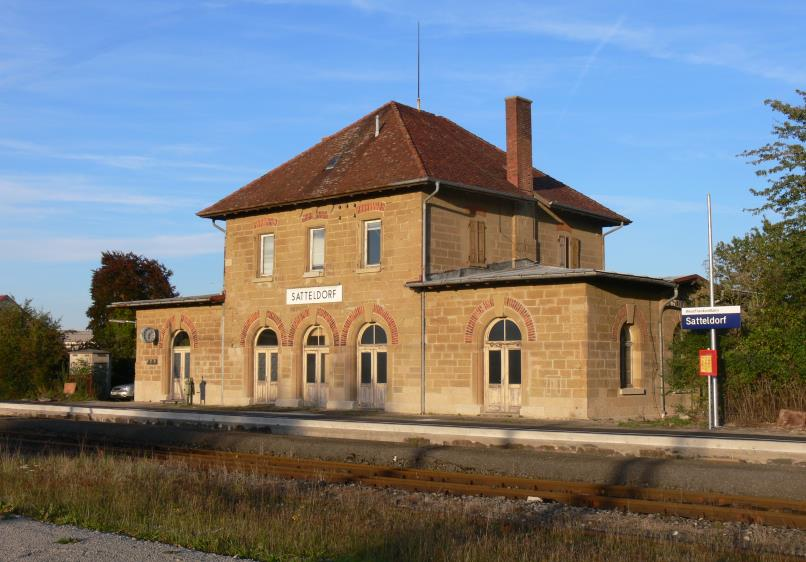
Reactivated Satteldorf station

Since 10 September 2007, Satteldorf station has been reopened in the industrial area of the village. At the same time, the bus services was profoundly restructured to focus on the station and reduced on the parallel road.

Following the reopening of Satteldorf, an interest group fought for the reopening of the station in Wallhausen (3,500 inhabitants), which took place after several delays on 15 December 2013.

The line is predominantly operated with class 628 diesel multiple units.

== Train crash in Schrozberg ==
Two Regional-Express trains crashed on 11 June 2003, killing six people and injuring others.
