= Main Valley =

The Main Valley may refer to:

- The valley of the river Main in Germany
- Main Valley Railway, a rail line running through the Main river valley
- Maintal, a town in Germany
- Maintal, a district of the city of Schweinfurt, Germany
- Main Valley, an area of the Maryland Zoo
