= Osterburken station =

Railway station in Osterburken, Germany

Osterburken
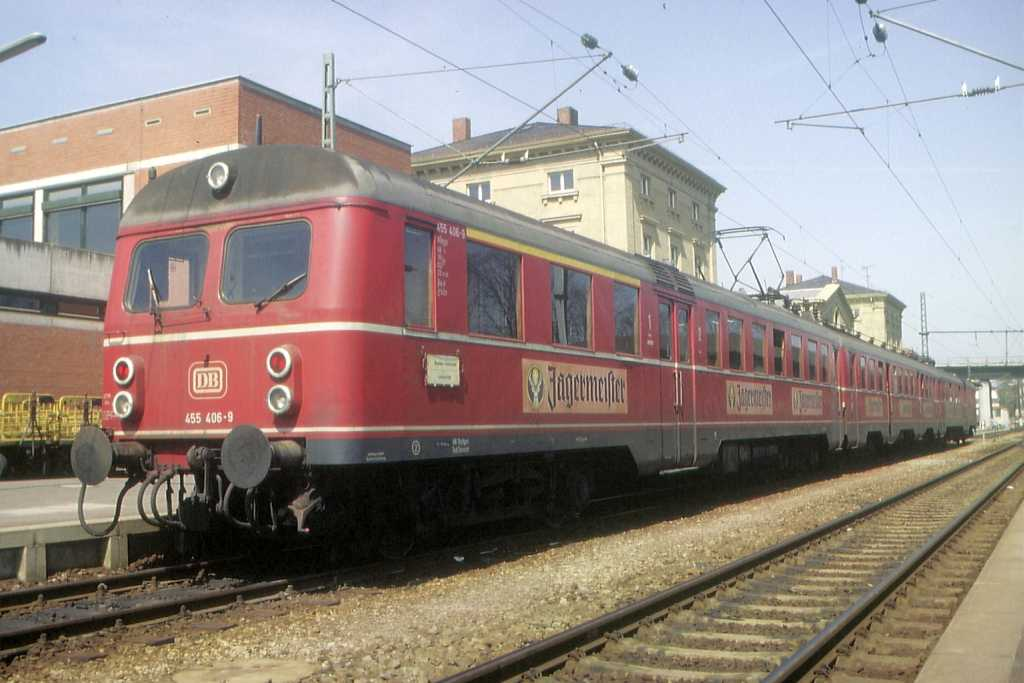
- Train in Osterburken station (April 1984)

General information
- Location: Bahnhofstr. 1, Osterburken, Baden-Württemberg; Germany
- Coordinates: 49°25′48″N 9°25′22″E
- Owner: Deutsche Bahn
- Operator: DB Netz; DB Station&Service
- Lines: Stuttgart–Würzburg (km 101.8); Neckarelz–Osterburken (km 81.3)
- Platforms: 4

Construction
- Accessible: Yes

Other information
- Station code: 4790
- DS100 code: TO
- IBNR: 80004790
- Category: 4
- Fare zone: VRN: 260; HNV: 421 (VRN transitional tariff)
- Website: www.bahnhof.de

History
- Opened: 1866

Services
Preceding station		Following station
Möckmühl towards Stuttgart Hbf	RE 8	Lauda towards Würzburg Hbf
Preceding station	(Stuttgart)	Following station
Adelsheim Ost towards Tübingen Hbf	MEX 18	Terminus
Preceding station	DB Regio Bayern	Following station
Rosenberg (Baden) towards Würzburg Hbf	RB 85	Terminus
Preceding station		Following station
Adelsheim Nord towards Miltenberg	RB 84	Terminus
Preceding station	Rhine-Neckar S-Bahn	Following station
Adelsheim Nord towards Homburg (Saar) Hbf	S1	Terminus
Location

Osterburken station is at the junction of the Franconia Railway and the Neckarelz–Osterburken railway. It is served by Regionalbahn, Regional-Express and Rhine-Neckar S-Bahn services.

== Location ==
The station is located about 300 metres from central Osterburken.

== History ==
The Royal Württemberg State Railways (Königlich Württembergischen Staats-Eisenbahnen or K.W.St.E.) opened the station in 1866 as the terminus of the Lower Jagst Railway (Untere Jagstbahn) from Heilbronn to Osterburken, now considered part of the Franconia Railway. At the same time the Mannheim–Würzburg railway (Odenwaldbahn) railway was opened.

At the end of March 1945, an "evacuation" train with detainees from the Neckarelz concentration camp was parked near the station for three days. Nine of the detainees died and were buried in a common grave at what is now the old cemetery; a memorial stone is located there.

Services on line S1 of the Rhine-Neckar S-Bahn commenced at the 2003/2004 timetable change on 14 December 2003. As part of the upgrade for the S-Bahn, the platforms for tracks 1 (next to the entrance building) and 3 (bay platform) were made fully accessible and are provided with shelters from the weather. The 140 metre-long and 76 centimetre-high platforms now provide level access to the S-Bahn trains, which operate almost exclusively on track 1.

== Rail services ==
Osterburken station is a railway junction in Baden. The Franconia Railway (Stuttgart–Würzburg) and the Neckarelz–Osterburken railway, part of the Baden Odenwald Railway, meet here. On the latter route, the station is the terminus of line S1 of the Rhine-Neckar S-Bahn. Regional-Express services connect with Würzburg at two-hour intervals, and are supplemented by additional peak hour services. Regional-Express services run via Heilbronn to Stuttgart every 120 minutes. Regionalbahn services run to/from Heilbronn and Stuttgart, some starting or ending at Lauda. The S1 service provides an hourly connection to Homburg via Mosbach-Neckarelz, Eberbach, Heidelberg, Mannheim, Ludwigshafen, Neustadt (Weinstraße) and Kaiserslautern.

Train class	Route	Interval
RE 8	Würzburg – Lauda – Osterburken – Bad Friedrichshall – Neckarsulm – Heilbronn – Stuttgart	60 minutes
MEX 18	Osterburken – Möckmühl – Bad Friedrichshall – Neckarsulm – Heilbronn – Bietigheim-Bissingen – Ludwigsburg – Stuttgart - Plochingen – Tübingen	60 min
RB 85	Würzburg – Lauda – Osterburken	60 minutes (Mon – Fri only)
S1	Homburg (Saar) – Kaiserslautern – Neustadt (Weinstr) – Schifferstadt – Ludwigshafen (Rhein) – Mannheim – Heidelberg – Eberbach – Mosbach-Neckarelz – Osterburken	60 minutes

== Entrance building ==
Built in the 1860s, the entrance building was auctioned by Deutsche Bahn in 2014 and bought by the municipality of Osterburken for €120,000. It has an area of around 1090 square metres and a part of the building that is not used by Deutsche Bahn is rented out.
