= Odenwald Railway (Baden) =

Railway line in Germany

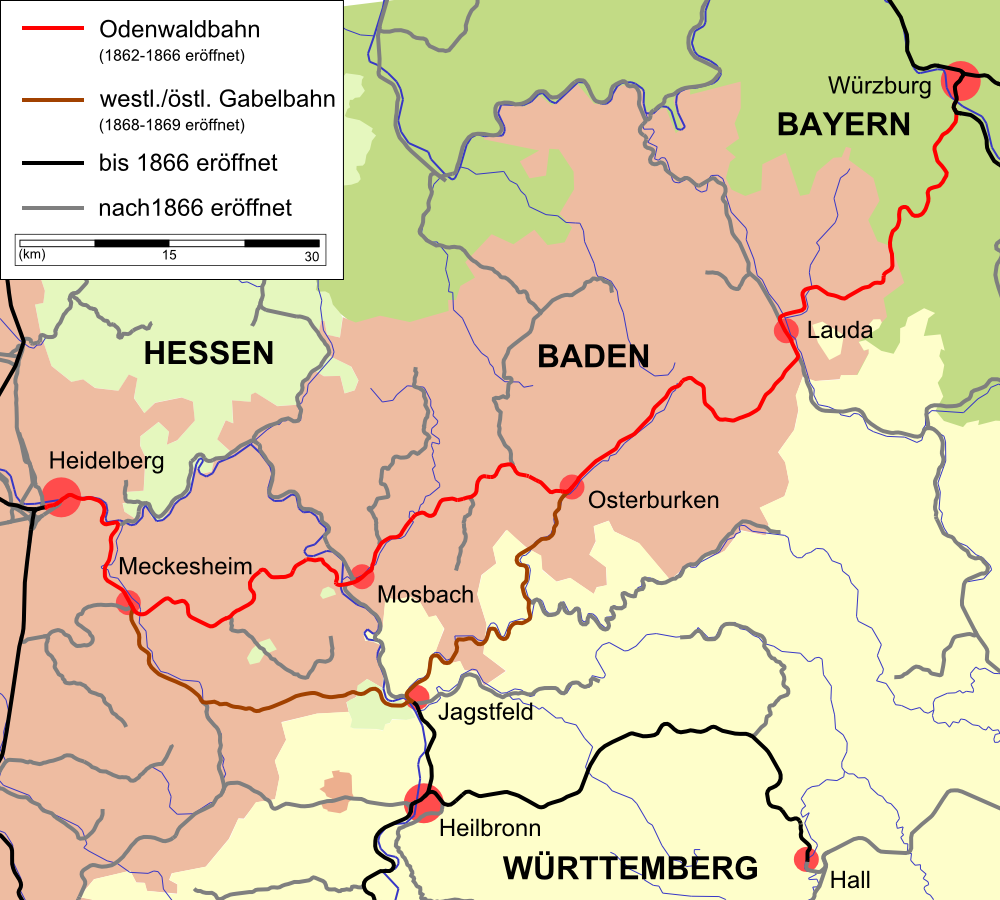
- Historical route of the Odenwald Railway

Overview
- Native name: Odenwaldbahn
- Locale: Baden and Bavaria, Germany

Technical
- Line length: 159.2 km (98.9 mi)
- Track gauge: 1,435 mm (4 ft 8 1/2 in) standard gauge

The Odenwald Railway (German: Odenwaldbahn) (sometimes referred to as the Baden Odenwald Railway to distinguish it from the Hessian line of the same name) was the name given to a Baden railway line in southwestern Germany built from between 1862 and 1866. It ran from Heidelberg via Neckargemünd and Meckesheim through the Little Odenwald mountains to Waibstadt, Mosbach, Osterburken and Lauda to Würzburg in Bavaria.

== History ==
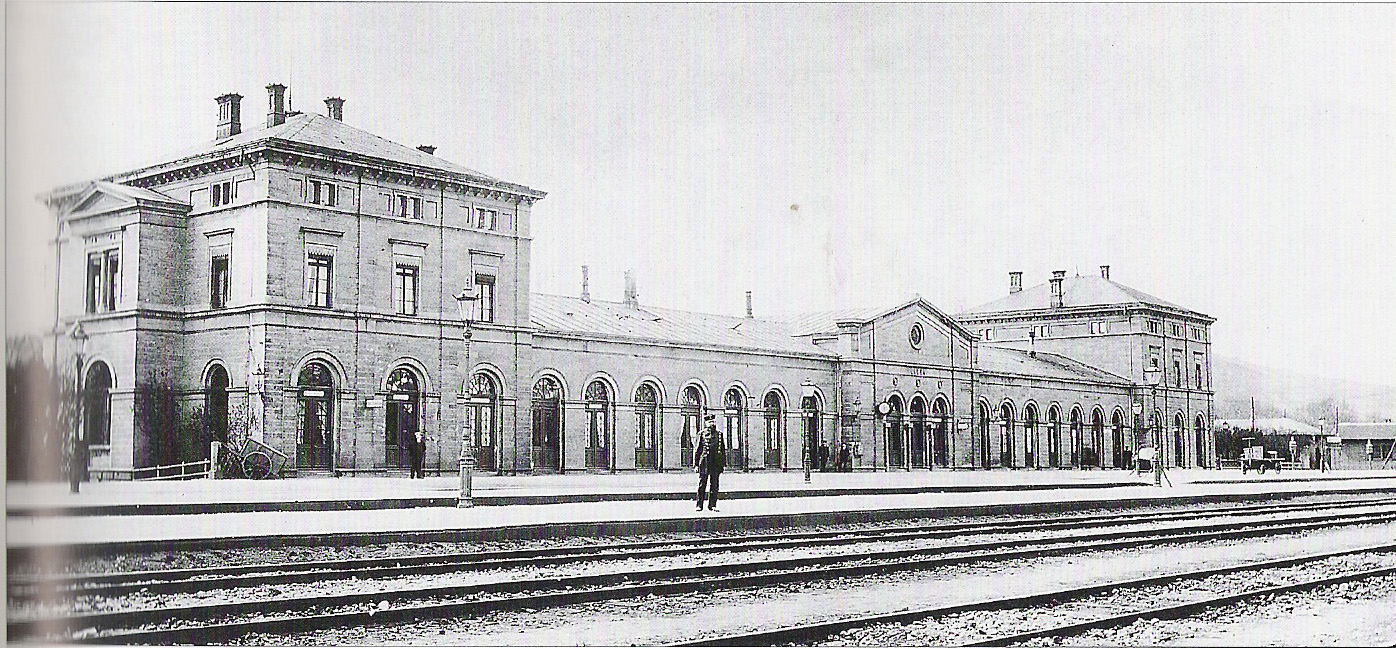
Lauda station in 1871. Here the Tauber Valley Railway branched off from the Odenwald Railway.

The plans in the mid-19th century to build a railway network in the Grand Duchy of Baden, initially focused on the construction of the Baden Mainline as a north–south route through the Upper Rhine Valley from Mannheim to Basel as well as a connection through the Lake Constance area to Constance. However, northeastern Baden continued to be ignored. Therefore, from the 1850s, ever louder demands were raised for a connection to the rail network from the poor areas in southern Odenwald, in the Bauland and in the Tauber valley (mockingly known as Badisch Sibirien, Baden Siberia, because of its small population, cold winters and isolation from the rest of Baden). While a railway line through the area was expected to be only marginally profitable, if at all, railway construction was seen, with its transport benefits, to be an investment that would promote development in this area.

The Kingdom of Bavaria also had an interest in the construction of a railway between the Palatinate and Lower Franconia, since such a railway would connect the Bavarian heartland with the then Bavarian Palatinate, bypassing Württemberg. However, Bavaria wanted a route along the Main river via Wertheim, Miltenberg, Amorbach and Eberbach, while Baden preferred a more southerly route via Mosbach. After lengthy negotiations, the two countries agreed in 1862 on a route through Mosbach. The agreement also included the construction of a railway bridge over the Rhine at Mannheim, so that the direct railway reached the Palatinate from Würzburg.

The Baden Odenwald Railway was opened in two stages: from Heidelberg via Neckargemünd, Meckenheim Neckarbischofsheim, Aglasterhausen and Neckarelz to Mosbach on 23 October 1862 and from Mosbach to Würzburg via Osterburken and Lauda on 25 August 1866. The construction of the second section was delayed as a result of the fighting in Tauberbischofsheim during the War of 1866.

The routing of the Odenwald Railway on the section between Neckargemünd and Mosbach is peculiar. Instead of running through the Neckar valley via Eberbach it took the hillier and thus operationally problematic route through the Elsenz and Schwarzbach valleys via Meckenheim, Neckarbischofsheim and Aglasterhausen. This route was chosen because the Grand Duchy of Hesse reached to the river Neckar between Neckargemünd and Eberbach, so that a railway would have had to run through Hesse, which was not considered desirable.

Shortly after its completion, the Odenwald Railway was connected by two routes with the Württemberg railway network, from Meckenheim via Sinsheim to Jagstfeld (westliche Gabelbahn, ”Western Fork Railway”, opened 1868/1869) and from Jagstfeld to Osterburken (Östliche Gabelbahn, ”Eastern Fork Railway”, opened in 1869). Following the completion of the Odenwald Railway, the Tauber Valley Railway (Taubertalbahn) was opened between 1867 and 1869 to Wertheim and Bad Mergentheim in order to develop the Tauber Valley.

=== Further development ===
As already anticipated during the construction of the line, traffic on the Odenwald Railway was only light. It did not meet expectations either in transport or political terms. However, the combination of the line with new railway lines that were subsequently built created transport linkages that became more important that the connection of the Palatinate and Lower Franconia. As a result, the individual sections of the Odenwald Railway developed very differently:

==== Heidelberg–Neckargemünd ====
This section is now considered to be part of the Neckar Valley Railway (Heidelberg–Heilbronn) opened in 1879 and serves passengers and freight between the Palatinate and the Stuttgart area. The line is duplicated and has been electrified since 1972. Since 2003, the section has been part of the Rhine-Neckar S-Bahn. With S-Bahn services on the Homburg–Kaiserslautern–Mosbach (–Osterburken) and Heidelberg–Eberbach routes as well as regional services on the Heidelberg–Mosbach–Neckarelz–Heilbronn and Heidelberg–Meckenheim–Heilbronn routes, this section is well served by local passenger services.

==== Neckargemünd–Meckenheim ====
Operationally, this section forms part of the Neckargemünd–Bad Friedrichshall-Jagstfeld railway ("Western Fork Railway") to Jagstfeld. Along with the Neckar Valley Railway, it creates a second connection between Heidelberg and Heilbronn. In addition trains runs to Eppingen. The route has been duplicated and electrified since 2009. S-Bahn trains run to Eppingen (S 5) and Aglasterhausen (S 51).

==== Meckenheim–Neckarelz ====
After the opening of the Neckar Valley Railway this section very quickly lost importance because through trains now usually ran on the Neckar Valley Railway. Of all the sections of the Odenwald Railway this had the least volume of traffic and was downgraded to a minor line.

With the destruction of the Neckar bridge in Obrigheim in 1945, the Meckenheim–Obrigheim section became a branch line, the bridge over the Neckar was not rebuilt because little traffic was affected. As demand between Aglasterhausen and Obrigheim was very low and the maintenance of two tunnels on this section was costly, this section was shut down in 1971 and dismantled in the following years. The Meckenheim–Aglasterhausen section, which follows the Schwarzenbach, became known as the Schwarzbachtalbahn (Schwarzenbach Valley Railway).

Around 1980, Deutsche Bundesbahn announced the closure of the line completely. This would have meant that Krebsbach Valley Railway (Krebsbachtalbahn), which had existed since 1902 and branches off at Neckarbischofsheim Nord and runs to Hüffenhardt, would have had no connection to the rest of the rail network. So In 1982, the state-owned South-West German Railway Company (Südwestdeutsche Eisenbahn-Gesellschaft, SWEG), which had operated the Krebsbach Valley Railway since 1963, took over operations between Meckenheim and Aglasterhausen. In August 2009, during the second phase of the expansion of the Rhine-Neckar S-Bahn the track was acquired by Deutsche Bahn, electrified and upgraded for S-Bahn operations. Passenger operations on the Krebsbach Valley Railway were closed, as it could not, according to the SWEG, be operated profitably any longer. The Heidelberg–Meckenheim–Aglasterhausen connection is now operated as line S 51.

==== Neckarelz–Osterburken ====
This stretch now only has regional importance as part of the Rhine-Neckar S-Bahn. The route is duplicated and has been electrified since 1975.

==== Osterburken–Würzburg ====
Together with the Stuttgart–Heilbronn–Osterburken line, this line connects Stuttgart and Würzburg and thus forms the major north–south link between the regions of Stuttgart and Heilbronn via Würzburg to the North Sea ports. The route is duplicated and has been electrified since 1975.

This is the section of the lines that has the greatest significance. Long-distance trains run on this section. Since it is very winding and thus does not allow very high speeds, it lost its significance after the Second World War—especially as a result of the construction of high-speed railway lines—so, in 2001, the last remaining long-distance service, the Rennsteig InterRegio service was stopped. However, the Osterburken–Würzburg line is still used for many freight trains on north–south routes. Local transport had a rather low priority. Thus, in the 1970s between Osterburken and Lauda stops at all stations were temporarily abandoned due to the sparse population. From the turn of the millennium, services were reactivated at some of them, such as Rosenberg (Baden), Eubigheim and Boxberg / Wölchingen, which are significant for school transport, and they are served on weekdays by a few Regionalbahn trains.
