= Lauda-Königshofen =

- Town
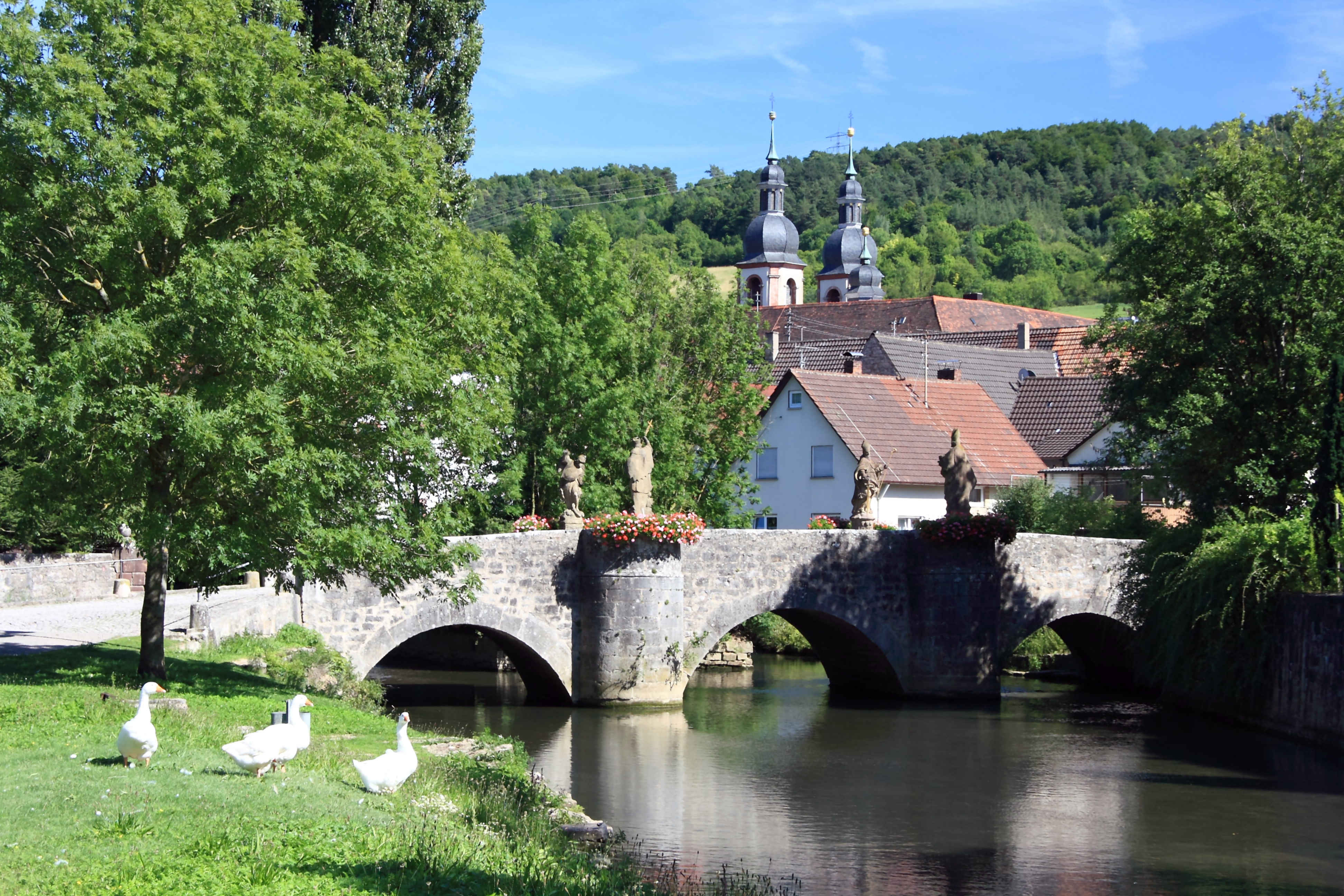

- Coat of arms

- Location of Lauda-Königshofen within Main-Tauber-Kreis district
- Interactive map of Lauda-Königshofen
- Location within Germany Location within Baden-Württemberg
- Coordinates: 49°34′07″N 09°42′14″E
- Country: Germany
- State: Baden-Württemberg
- Admin. region: Stuttgart
- District: Main-Tauber-Kreis
- Subdivisions: 12 Stadtteile/Stadtbezirke

Government
  - Mayor (2020–28): Lukas Braun (FDP)

Area
  - Total: 94.44 km^{2} (36.46 sq mi)
- Elevation: 192 m (630 ft)

Population (2025-12-31)
  - Total: 14,150
  - Density: 149.8/km^{2} (388.1/sq mi)
- Time zone: UTC+01:00 (CET)
  - Summer (DST): UTC+02:00 (CEST)
- Postal codes: 97922
- Dialling codes: 09343
- Vehicle registration: TBB
- Website: www.lauda-koenigshofen.de

Lauda-Königshofen (German pronunciation: [ˈlaʊda ˌkøːnɪçsˈhoːfn̩]) is a town in the Main-Tauber district in Baden-Württemberg, Germany. It is situated on the river Tauber, 7 km southeast of Tauberbischofsheim, and 30 km southwest of Würzburg. Most of the roughly 300 houses in the traditional village of Königshofen date to between the 16th century and mid-19th century, and it is known for the 500+ year-old Königshöfer Messe, an annual festival that attracts 150,000 people over the 10-day festival. Lauda station is at a junction of the Franconia Railway and the Tauber Valley Railway.

== Districts ==
The 12 districts with population (as of 2001): Area in km^{2} (as in 2006)

Lauda	5.745	12.55
Königshofen	2.815	13.81
Gerlachsheim	1.888	8.75
Unterbalbach	1.634	5.18
Oberlauda	742	6.96
Oberbalbach	698	7.99
Heckfeld	470	14.68
Beckstein	372	2.88
Sachsenflur	351	5.98
Messelhausen	336	8.16
Marbach	262	1.31
Deubach	118	6.22

== Twin towns ==
- Boissy-Saint-Léger (France)
- Paks (Hungary)
- Rátka (Hungary)

== Sports ==
- FV Lauda, soccer
- Lauda Hornets, American football

== Notable natives ==
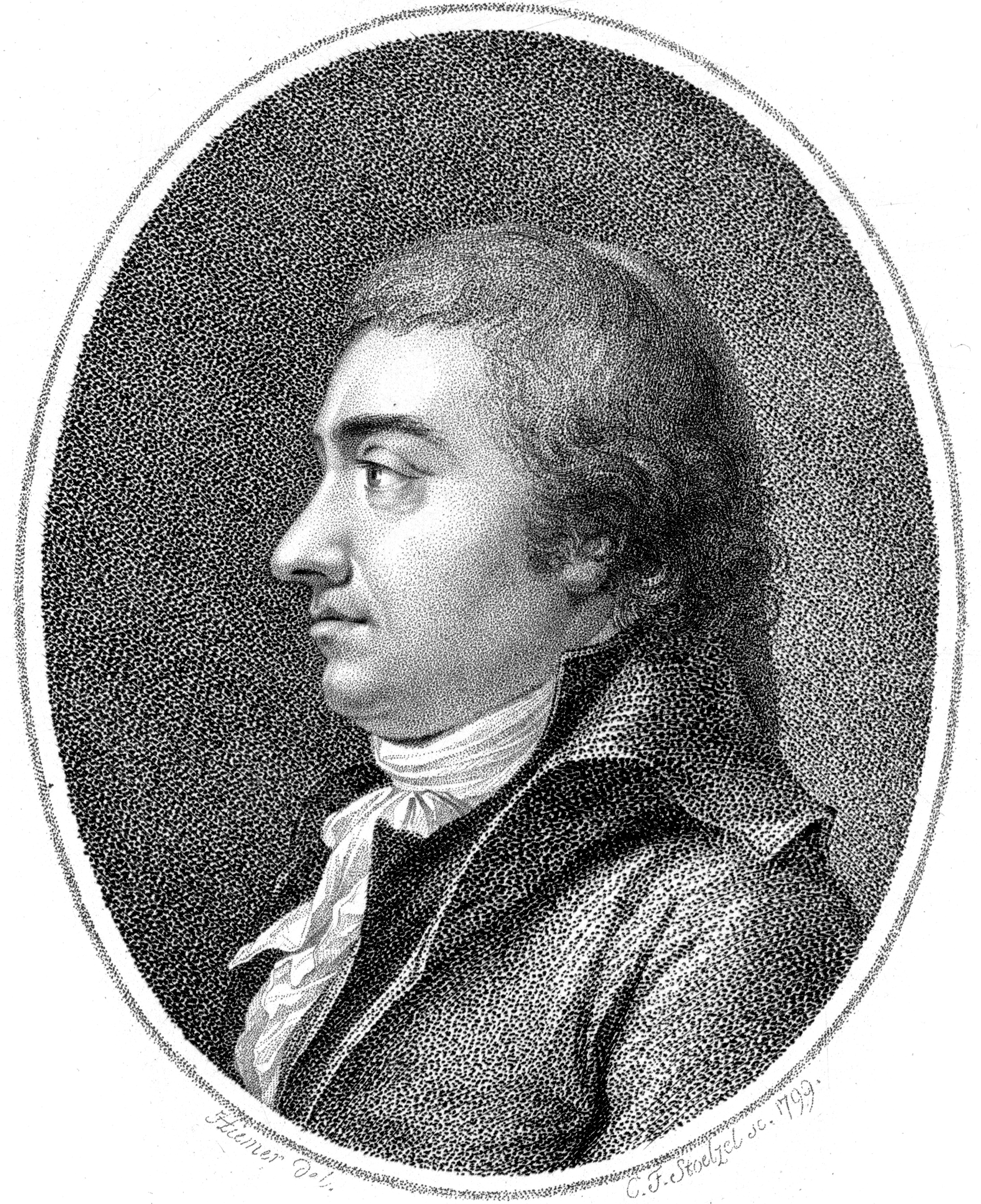
Johann Rudolf Zumsteeg, 1799

- Johann Gottfried von Aschhausen (1575–1622), Prince-Bishop of Bamberg and of Würzburg
- Johann Rudolf Zumsteeg (1760–1802), composer
- Johann Martin Schleyer (1831–1912), developer of artificial language Volapük
- Albert Hehn (1908–1983), actor
- Heinrich Ehrler (1917–1945), Luftwaffe military aviator and wing commander
- Peter Frank (born 1968), jurist, currently serves as a judge in the Federal Constitutional Court

=== Sport ===
- Hans-Jürgen Hehn (born 1944), fencer, team world champion and silver medallist, 1976 Summer Olympics
- Manuela Ruben (born 1964), figure skater, silver medallist, 1984 European Figure Skating Championships
- Thorsten Weidner (born 1967), fencer, silver and gold medallist, 1988 & 1992 Summer Olympics

== Notable enterprises ==
Among the business entities located in Lauda are two world-famous manufacturers of laboratory equipment:

- Lauda, a manufacturer of thermostats.
- Herzog, a manufacturer of crude oil and fuel testing equipment. The founder of the company, Walter Herzog, has moved to Lauda after World War II, and pioneered a few important innovations in the testing of oil and fuels, like first automatic flash point tester, first automatic distillation apparatus, and others.
- Becksteiner Winzer, a wine cooperative that grows, produces and sells wines made from the region's grapes.

== Events ==
- Königshöfer Messe, annual fair
