= Joseph von Maier =

German rabbi

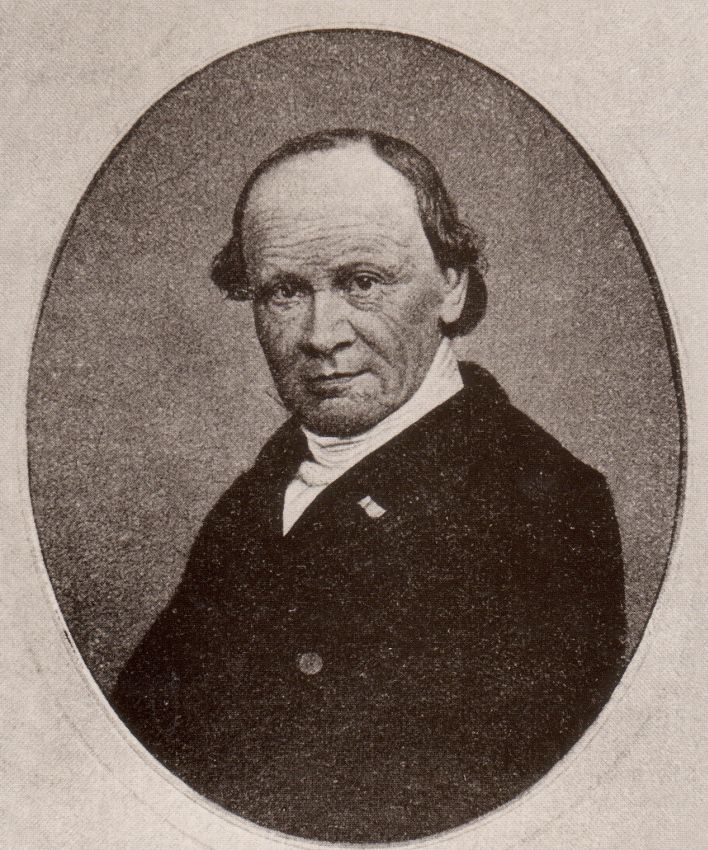

Personal life
- Born: Joseph Maier Rosenthal; 27 April 1797 Laudenbach-Fruchtlingen, Duchy of Württemberg (near Bad Mergentheim)
- Died: 19 August 1873 (aged 76) Stuttgart, Kingdom of Württemberg
- Buried: Hoppenlau Cemetery
- Spouse: Rebekka Auerbacher (m. 1835)
- Education: University of Tübingen

Religious life
- Religion: Judaism

Joseph von Maier (Hebrew: יוסף בן מאיר, romanized: Yosef ben Meir; 27 April 1797 – 19 August 1873) was a German rabbi, who served as Oberkirchenrath ('High Consistorial Councillor') of the Kingdom of Württemberg.

== Biography ==
Joseph Maier Rosenthal was born to Sara (née Lazarus) and Meier Rosenthal in 1797 in the town of Laudenbach-Fruchtlingen, near Bad Mergentheim. He attended ḥeder as a child, and went on to become a pupil at the yeshivas of Fürth and Mainz.

From the 1820s, he began working as a religious teacher, eventually in Frankfurt. After receiving his rabbinical ordination in 1827, he worked as Hausrabbiner (private rabbi) to the Kaulla banking family in Stuttgart. In 1832 he became Bezirksrabbiner (district rabbi) of that town, a position he held until his death. He was president of the first rabbinical conference held at Brunswick in 1844, and he was also a member of the Jewish Consistory of Württemberg.

In recognition of religious and philanthropic activities, he was ennobled by King Charles of Württemberg on his seventieth birthday in 1867, and decorated with the Ritterkreuz des Württembergischen Kronordens. This gave him the distinction of being the first German rabbi belonging to the nobility.

== Partial bibliography ==
=== Books and pamphlets ===
- Lehrbuch der biblischen Geschichte als Einleitung zum Religionsunterricht in israelitischen Schulen. Jäger. 1828.
- Auswahl von Bibelsprüchen und Liederversen über die mosaische Glaubens- und Sittenlehre. Frankfurt a. M.: Jäger. 1830.
- Worte der Weihe bei der feierlichen öffentlichen Einweihung des neuen israelitischen Friedhofs zu Stuttgart am 23. November 1834. Stuttgart: Hallberger. 1834.
- Welche Hindernisse haben wir aus dem Wege zu räumen?: eine Predigt, am Versöhnungstage 5596 (3. Oktober 1835) beim Frühgottesdienste. Stuttgart: Fr. Brodhag. 1835. hdl:2027/hvd.hnrprx.
- Rede, bei dem Antritt seines Amtes als Rabbiner zu Stuttgart am zweiten Sabbath Chanucca 5595 (3. Januar 1835). Stuttgart: Hallberger. 1835.
- Confirmations-Handlung nebst dem Confirmanden-Unterricht. Stuttgart: Beck und Fränkel. 1836.
- Israelitische Festpredigten und Casualreden. Stuttgart: J.B. Metzler. 1840. With Isaac Noah Mannheimer and Gotthold Salomon.
- Israels Vergangenheit, Gegenwart und Zukunft: ein religiöser Vortrag, am ersten Morgen des neuen Jahrhunderts (Neujahrsfest 5601) den 28. September 1840. Stuttgart. 1840.
- Die erste Rabbiner-Versammlung und ihre Gegner. Stuttgart: Hallberger. 1845.
- Über den Judeneid. Stuttgart: Gutenberg. 1852.
- Die Synagoge: drei Reden zum Abschiede aus der alten und zur Einweihung der neuen Synagoge in Stuttgart. Stuttgart: J. B. Metzler. 1861.
- Seder Tefilah: Israelitische Gebetordnung für Synagoge und Schule, wie zur häuslichen Gottesverehrug. Stuttgart: A. Bonz & Co. 1878. hdl:2027/coo.31924072009669.

=== Published eulogies ===
- Zum Andenken an die Frau Räthin Eva von Kaulla, geborne Bing. Stuttgart: Maeutler. 1837.
- Rede am Grabe des frühe vollendeten Jünglings, Salomon Kaulla, Schüler des obern Gymnasiums. Stuttgart: Müller. 1840.
- Denkmal für S.L. Benedict, Bankier und Ober-Kirchenvorsteher in Stuttgart. Eßlingen: Harburger. 1842.
- Rede bei der Beerdigung der Frau Sara v. Kaulla, geb. v. Hirsch. Stuttgart: Gebr. Mäntler. 1845.
- Rede bei der Beerdigung der Frau Jeannette Levi, geb. Crailsheim. Stuttgart: Greiner. 1845.
- Andenken an die verewigte Frau Commerzienräthin Lea Kaulla, geb. Kaulla. Eßlingen: Harburger. 1849.
- Dem Andenken des verstorbenen Bankier M. Benedict. Eßlingen: Harburger. 1852.
- Dem Andenken des verewigten Dr. S. Dreifus, Chef des Bankierhauses Gebrüder Benedict. Eßlingen: Harburger. 1853.
- Rede am Grabe der Frau Franziska Levi, geb. Mayer. Stuttgart: K. F. Hering. 1853.
- Andenken an die verewigte Frau Rebecca Jacob, geb. Kaulla. Stuttgart: J. B. Metzler. 1863.
- Andenken an den Kaufmann Jonathan Arnold. Stuttgart: J. B. Metzler. 1865.
- Erinnerung an Dr. Emil Auerbach. Stuttgart: J. B. Metzler. 1867.
- Rede am Grabe des Bankier Joseph Altmann. Stuttgart: J. B. Metzler. 1870.
- Andenken an Abraham Arnold, Kaufmann in Stuttgart. Stuttgart: J. B. Metzler. 1871.
