= Main Valley Railway =

Railway route in Germany

Coordinates: 49°45′22″N 9°10′31″E

Aschaffenburg–Wertheim railway

Overview
- Native name: Maintalbahn
- Line number: 5220 (Aschaffenburg–Miltenberg Gbf); 5224 (Miltenberg West–Wertheim)
- Locale: Bavaria and Baden-Württemberg, Germany

Service
- Route number: 781 (until 2007: 802)

Technical
- Line length: 68.4 km (42.5 mi)
- Track gauge: 1,435 mm (4 ft 8 1/2 in) standard gauge
- Operating speed: Aschaffenburg–Miltenberg: 120 km/h (75 mph); Miltenberg–Wertheim: 100 km/h (62 mph)

The Main Valley Railway (German: Maintalbahn) is a single-tracked, main line running alongside the river Main in Bavaria and Baden-Württemberg in southern Germany. In Miltenberg it connects to the Miltenberg–Walldürn railway. It also has a junction with the Tauber Valley Railway at the Baden town of Wertheim, that runs to Crailsheim.

== History ==
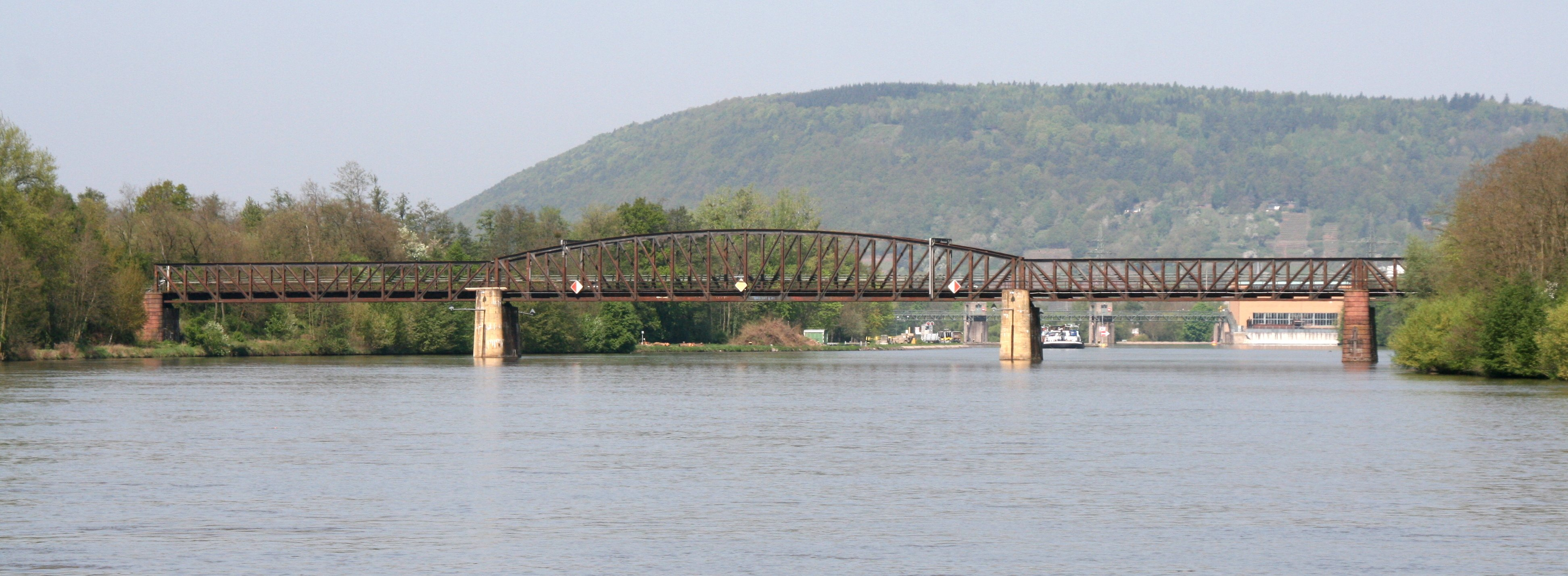
Bridge over the Main in Miltenberg (April 2009)

Railway stations in Miltenberg

The Bavarian State Railways (Königlich Bayerische Staats-Eisenbahnen) first connected the town of Miltenberg to the railway network with a main line railway from Aschaffenburg, which was opened on 12 November 1876. A rail terminus was built south of the Main river on the edge of the old town, which would later be called Miltenberg Hauptbahnhof (main station). The line to Seckach via Amorbach (Seckach–Miltenberg railway, also called the Madonnenlandbahn) begins here.

The extension of the line to Wertheim was opened as a branch line on 21 May 1906 to Stadtprozelten and extended to Wertheim on 1 October 1912. The last 3.85 kilometre-long section was owned by the Grand Duchy of Baden State Railway (Großherzoglich Badische Staatseisenbahnen). Wertheim had been connected by the Tauber Valley Railway with Lauda since 1868 and by the Wertheim–Lohr railway to Lohr am Main since 1881.

A line was built to a bridge over the Main, which branched off near the entrance to Miltenberg station, and ran along the right (northern) bank to the through station of Miltenberg Nord. All through passenger trains had to push back from the main station to the junction and then reverse to continue their journey. Between the 1950 and 1970s, Heckeneilzugen ("hedgerow expresses") on the Lake Constance–Crailsheim–Aschaffenburg–Frankfurt route ran on this line.

The Hauptbahnhof was closed for passenger traffic in the summer of 1977 and has since served only as a freight yard. Passenger services have stopped since then at the purpose built northern station. This was renamed as Miltenberg and the old terminus as Miltenberg Gbf (freight yard). Since that time, the trains to Seckach via Amorbach have also begun and ended at the former North station. The freight yard was closed in 2005.

In its position paper. Weichenstellung 2017 ("setting the course for 2017"), the council of the Miltenberg (district) supported electrification of the railway line from Miltenberg to Aschaffenburg. This would allow trains to run through to/from Frankfurt am Main and an hourly service on the weekend.

== Current situation ==
Passenger traffic on the Main and Tauber Valley Railways is operated by Westfrankenbahn, a subsidiary of Deutsche Bahn. There were plans to close both lines, but they were never implemented. Due to the cycle tourism in the Main and Tauber Valley, the line is enjoying greater popularity. From March to October, for example, Deutsche Bahn offers bicycle transport from Aschaffenburg to Crailsheim and either operates bicycle wagons or offers the carriage of bicycles in multipurpose compartments. The line has been renewed extensively in recent years. Regional-Express services run every two hours as the Main-Tauber-Express from Aschaffenburg to Crailsheim and thus do not require a change at Wertheim. The through Regional-Express services are predominantly operated with class 628 diesel multiple units. Siemens Desiro Classic (class 642; Desiro) railcars are mainly used on the Regionalbahn trains from Aschaffenburg to Miltenberg. Since the timetable change in 2017, a train composed of double-deck cars and two class 218 locomotives is also operated on this route. The Regionalbahn services run hourly from Monday to Friday between Aschaffenburg and Miltenberg; on the weekend they run every two hours between Aschaffenburg and Seckach.
