= Kirchheim (Verwaltungsgemeinschaft) =

- Verwaltungsgemeinschaft
- Location of Kirchheim within Würzburg district
- Interactive map of Kirchheim
- Location within Germany Location within Bavaria
- Coordinates: 49°39′N 9°52′E
- Country: Germany
- State: Bavaria
- Admin. region: Lower Franconia
- District: Würzburg
- Seat: Kirchheim
- Subdivisions: 2 municipalities

Area
  - Total: 29.37 km^{2} (11.34 sq mi)

Population (2025-12-31)
  - Total: 3,535
  - Density: 120.4/km^{2} (311.7/sq mi)
- Time zone: UTC+01:00 (CET)
  - Summer (DST): UTC+02:00 (CEST)
- Website: www.vg-kirchheim.de

Kirchheim is a Verwaltungsgemeinschaft (municipal association) in the district of Würzburg in Bavaria, Germany. Its seat is in Kirchheim.

It consists of the following municipalities:

1. Geroldshausen
2. Kirchheim
