= Geroldshausen =

- Municipality
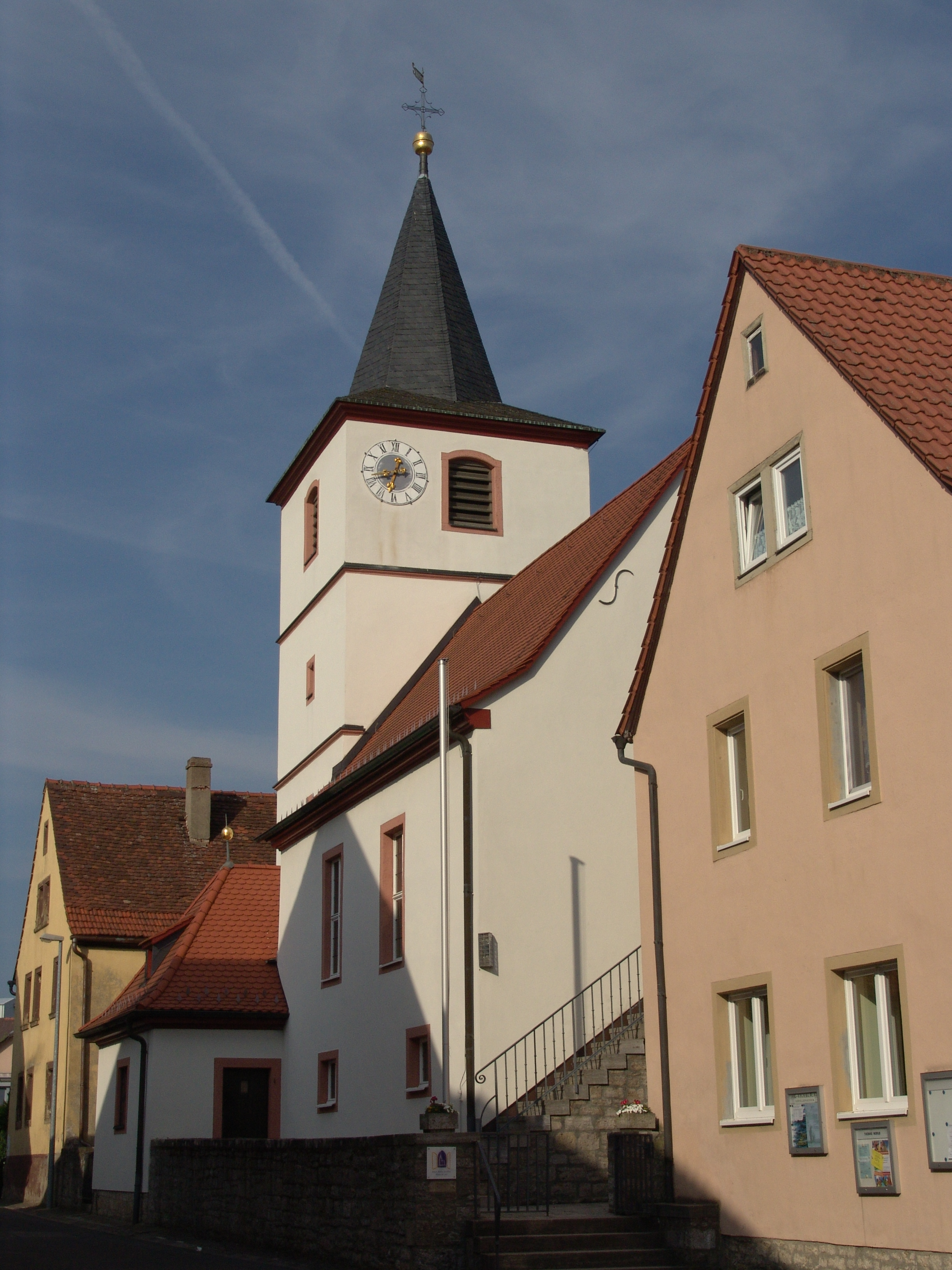
- Protestant church

- Coat of arms

- Location of Geroldshausen within Würzburg district
- Interactive map of Geroldshausen
- Location within Germany Location within Bavaria
- Coordinates: 49°41′N 9°54′E
- Country: Germany
- State: Bavaria
- Admin. region: Unterfranken
- District: Würzburg
- Municipal assoc.: Kirchheim

Government
  - Mayor (2019–25): Gunther Ehrhardt

Area
  - Total: 10.40 km^{2} (4.02 sq mi)
- Elevation: 313 m (1,027 ft)

Population (2025-12-31)
  - Total: 1,363
  - Density: 131.1/km^{2} (339.4/sq mi)
- Time zone: UTC+01:00 (CET)
  - Summer (DST): UTC+02:00 (CEST)
- Postal codes: 97256
- Dialling codes: 09366
- Vehicle registration: WÜ
- Website: www.geroldshausen.de

Geroldshausen is a municipality in the district of Würzburg in Bavaria, Germany.
