= Vorbach (Tauber, Rothenburg ob der Tauber) =

River in Germany

Location
- Country: Germany
- States: Baden-Württemberg; Bavaria

Physical characteristics
- Mouth
  - location: Tauber
  - coordinates: 49.3808°N 10.1707°E
- Length: 6.6 km (4.1 mi)

Basin features
- Progression: Tauber→ Main→ Rhine→ North Sea

Vorbach is a river of Baden-Württemberg and of Bavaria, Germany. It is a left tributary of the Tauber near Rothenburg ob der Tauber.

== See also ==
- List of rivers of Baden-Württemberg
- List of rivers of Bavaria
