= Weikersheim =

German town

- Town
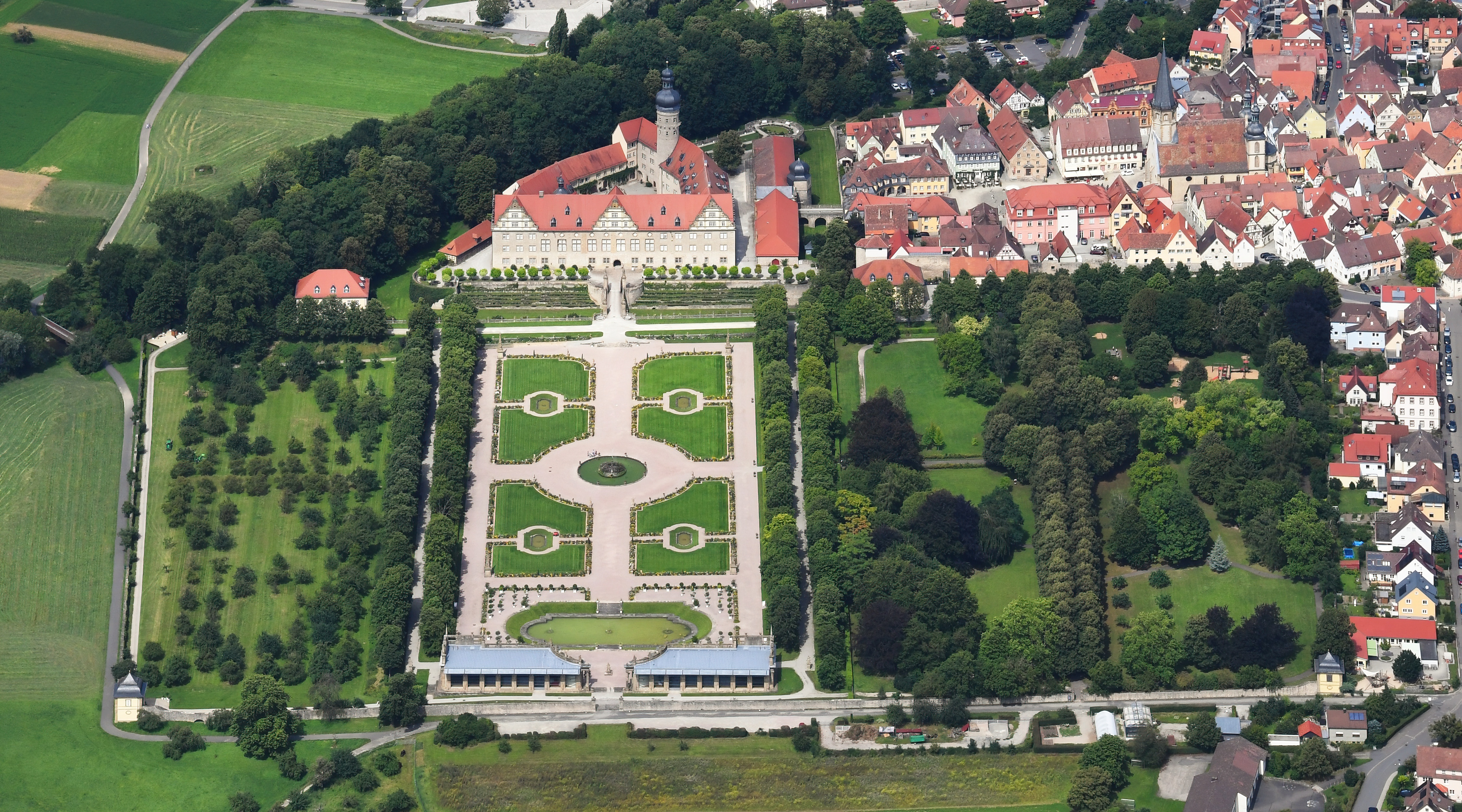
- Weikersheim on the Tauber

- Coat of arms

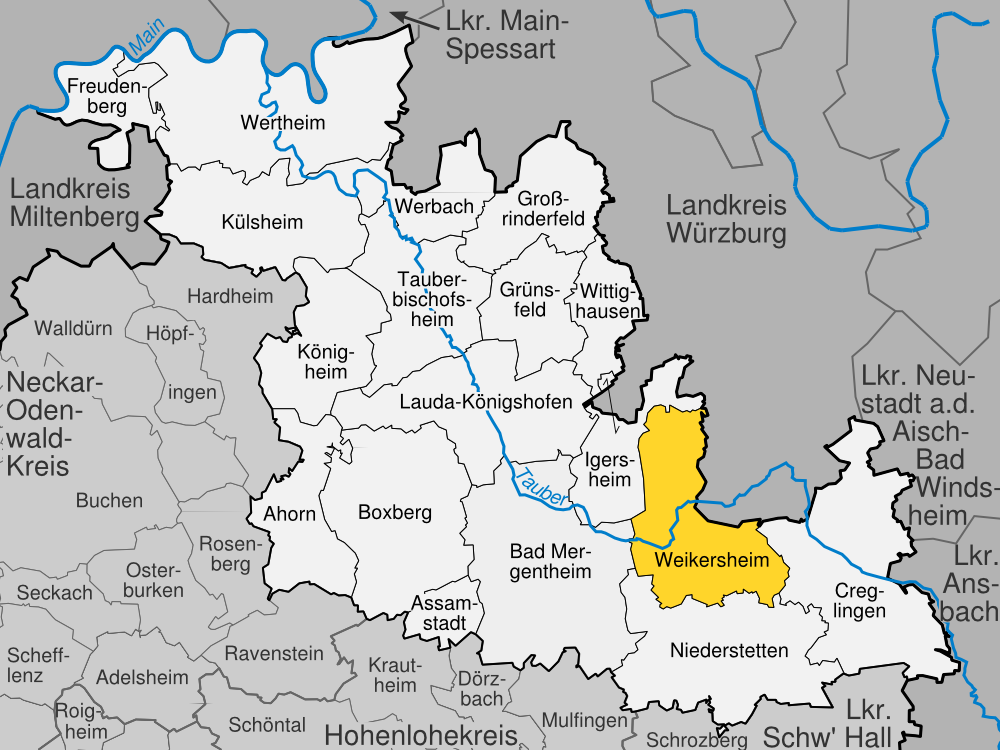
- Location of Weikersheim within Main-Tauber-Kreis district
- Interactive map of Weikersheim
- Location within Germany Location within Baden-Württemberg
- Coordinates: 49°28′54″N 09°53′57″E
- Country: Germany
- State: Baden-Württemberg
- Admin. region: Stuttgart
- District: Main-Tauber-Kreis

Government
  - Mayor (2021–29): Nick Schuppert (SPD)

Area
  - Total: 80.93 km^{2} (31.25 sq mi)
- Elevation: 230 m (750 ft)

Population (2025-12-31)
  - Total: 7,860
  - Density: 97.1/km^{2} (252/sq mi)
- Time zone: UTC+01:00 (CET)
  - Summer (DST): UTC+02:00 (CEST)
- Postal codes: 97990
- Dialling codes: 07934
- Vehicle registration: TBB, MGH
- Website: www.weikersheim.de

Weikersheim (German pronunciation: [ˈvaɪkɐshaɪm]) is a town in the Main-Tauber district of Baden-Württemberg, Germany.

== History ==
Town rights were granted to Weikersheim in 1313. As one of the seats of the House of Hohenlohe, until 1756 Weikersheim's town center was dominated by Weikersheim Castle, residence of the Hohenlohe-Weikersheim line. During the process of German mediatization from 1806 to 1809, Weikersheim was awarded to the Kingdom of Württemberg, whose government assigned the city to Oberamt Mergentheim. In 1938, the Oberamt was reorganized as Landkreis Mergentheim, under whose jurisdiction Weikersheim remained. From 1 January 1972 to 1 January 1975, Weikersheim incorporated eight municipalities. In that time, Baden-Württemberg reorganized its administrative structure, and as a result Weikersheim was assigned to the newly created Main-Tauber district. In 2000, the old town and palace were placed under protection as cultural monuments.

== Geography ==
The township (Stadt) of Weikersheim covers 80.92 square kilometers (31.24 sq mi) of the Main-Tauber district of Baden-Württemberg, a state of the Federal Republic of Germany. Weikersheim is physically located in the Tauberland, a landscape of muschelkalk crossed by numerous river valleys, but especially the Tauber and Vorbach. The lowest elevation above sea level in the municipal area, 213 meters (699 ft) Normalnull (NN), is found on the Tauber, near Elpersheim. The highest elevation, 444 meters (1,457 ft), is found to the south-east, near the border with Oberndorf (Weikersheim).

Part of the federally-protected Steinriegel landscape between Weikersheim and Elpersheim nature reserve is located within Weikersheim's municipal area.

== Coat of arms ==
Weikersheim's coat of arms displays a large "W" in silver below a golden crown upon a field of red. The first seal associated with Weikersheim is dated to 1435 and contained the "W", but from 1593 onward, it was supported by two lions and positioned above images of the Sun, Moon, and the planet Mercury. On 7 November 1949, the State of Baden-Württemberg awarded Weikersheim a coat of arms based on the original pattern, but with a new red-silver tincture. This pattern and tincture was affirmed on 31 May 1968 by the approval of the Federal Ministry of the Interior.

== Notable people ==
- Raphael Levi Hannover (1685–1779), a German Jewish mathematician and astronomer.
- Joseph von Maier (1797–1873), German rabbi and Landesrabbiner, a spiritual leader

== See also ==
- Weikersheim Castle
