= Kirchheim, Lower Franconia =

Kirchheim
- Municipality
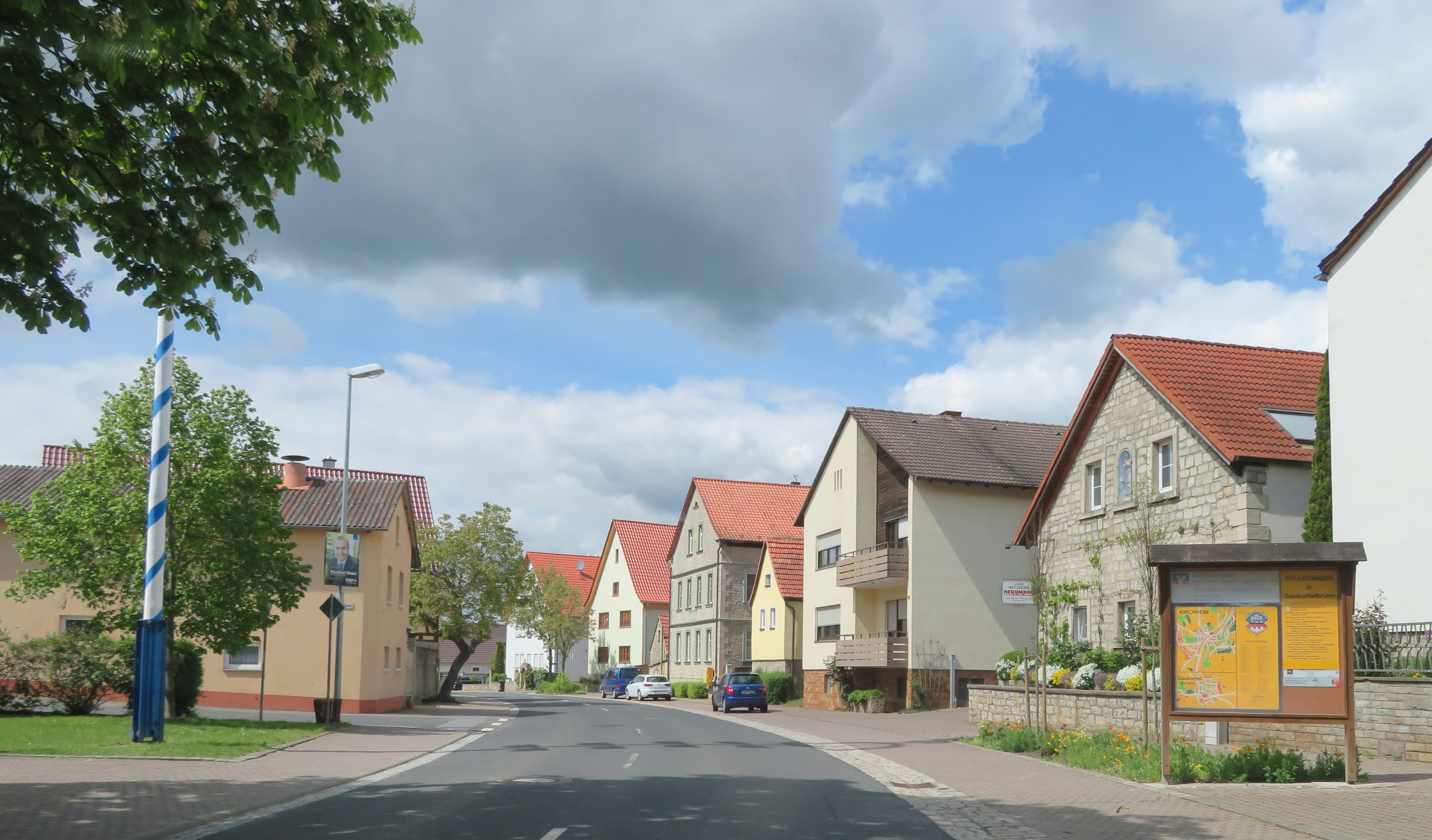
- Houses in Gaubüttelbrunn

- Coat of arms

- Location of Kirchheim within Würzburg district
- Interactive map of Kirchheim
- Location within Germany Location within Bavaria
- Coordinates: 49°39′N 9°52′E
- Country: Germany
- State: Bavaria
- Admin. region: Unterfranken
- District: Würzburg
- Municipal assoc.: Kirchheim

Government
  - Mayor (2024–30): Christian Stück (Greens)

Area
  - Total: 18.98 km^{2} (7.33 sq mi)
- Elevation: 277 m (909 ft)

Population (2025-12-31)
  - Total: 2,172
  - Density: 114.4/km^{2} (296.4/sq mi)
- Time zone: UTC+01:00 (CET)
  - Summer (DST): UTC+02:00 (CEST)
- Postal codes: 97268
- Dialling codes: 09366
- Vehicle registration: WÜ
- Website: www.kirchheim-ufr.de

Kirchheim (German pronunciation: [ˈkɪʁçhaɪm]) is a municipality in the district of Würzburg in Bavaria in Germany.
