= Franconia Railway =

Railway line in Germany

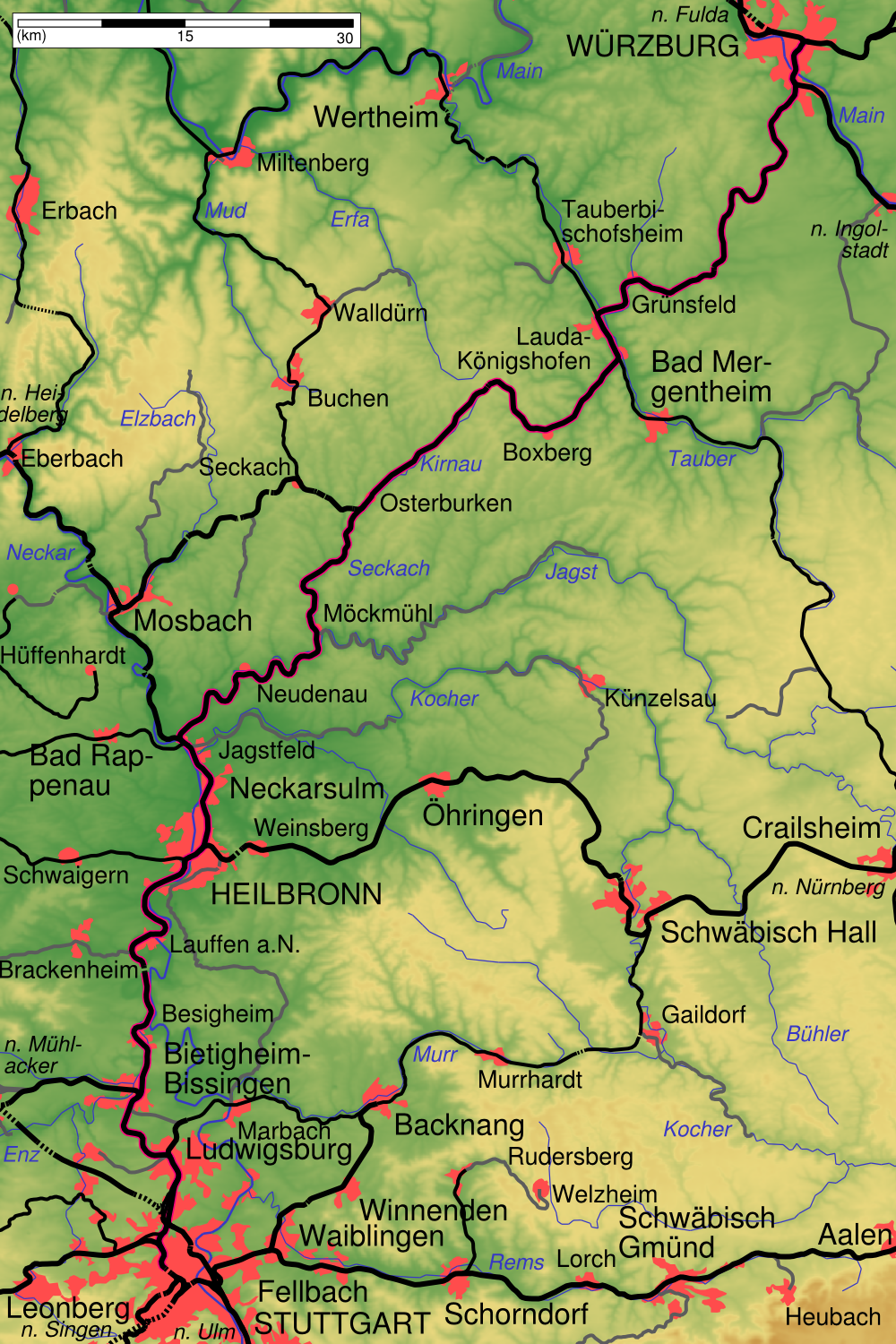

Overview
- Native name: Frankenbahn
- Status: Operational
- Owner: Deutsche Bahn
- Line number: 4800 (Stuttgart–Bietigheim-B.); 4900 (Bietigheim-B.–Osterburken); 4120 (Osterburken–Heidingsfeld); 5321 (Heidingsfeld–Würzburg)
- Locale: Baden-Württemberg and Bavaria, Germany
- Termini: Stuttgart Hbf.; Würzburg Hbf.
- Stations: 46

Service
- Type: Heavy rail, Passenger/freight rail Regional rail, Commuter rail
- Route number: 780; 790.4, 790.5 (S-Bahn Stuttgart); 705 (Heilbronn–Eberb.–Heidelb.); 706 (Heilbronn–Sinsh.–Heidelb.)
- Operator(s): DB Bahn

History
- Opened: Stages between 1846-1869

Technical
- Line length: 179.7 km (111.7 mi)
- Number of tracks: Double track
- Track gauge: 1,435 mm (4 ft 8 1/2 in) standard gauge
- Minimum radius: 312 m (1,024 ft)
- Electrification: 15 kV/16.7 Hz AC catenary
- Maximum incline: 1.5%

The Franconia Railway (German: Frankenbahn) is a 180-kilometre-long (110 mi) railway line in the north of the German state of Baden-Württemberg and the Bavarian province of Lower Franconia that links Stuttgart and Würzburg. Its name comes from the fact that the majority of the line runs through Franconia. The first section of the line was opened in 1848 and is one of the oldest lines in Germany. The main line is now electrified and has been almost entirely upgraded to double-tracks.

== Name ==
The name Frankenbahn is not a historical term for the Stuttgart–Würzburg line, but was adopted in 1996 following the regionalisation of operations.

Other historical names for different sections of the line included the Central Railway (Centralbahn), the first railway in Württemberg, running from Esslingen to Stuttgart and Ludwigsburg. The part of this route east of Stuttgart is now considered to be part of the Fils Valley Railway (Filstalbahn). It was later called the Northern Railway (Nordbahn), when it was extended to Heilbronn. The central section from Bad Friedrichshall to Osterburken was called the Lower Jagst Railway (Untere Jagstbahn) or the East Fork Railway (Östliche Gabelbahn). The section between Osterburken and Würzburg was originally part of the Odenwald Railway (Odenwaldbahn), between Heidelberg and Würzburg, built between 1862 and 1866.

== Route ==
The line follows the course of many different rivers. The course of the Neckar with its many loops complicates the route of the southern section. A direct route between Stuttgart and Heilbronn stations would be about 40 km, the length of the railway line is about 50 km, while a continuous line along the Neckar river would have a length of about 70 km.

The line leaves central Stuttgart through a tunnel under the Prag ridge. On the outskirts of Stuttgart, the route continues to gain height as it crosses the plateau west of the Neckar, reaching its high point at Kornwestheim. Passing the Hohenasperg fortress the line approaches the Enz valley, which is reached in Bietigheim. The line here separated from the Western Railway, which crosses the Bietigheim viaduct, which is about 33 metres high, while the Franconian line continues along the Enz to Besigheim, where it is close to the level of the river. After the nearby confluence of the Neckar and Enz, the line runs to Bad Friedrichshall-Jagstfeld through a very meandering valley, with only one loop at Neckarwestheim shortened by the Kirchheim Tunnel.

The line runs through Franconia towards the north-east, continuing along the winding Jagst valley to Möckmühl, from where it continues along the Seckach river to Adelsheim through an area of karst landscape known as the Bauland. The line continues along the Kirnau river through Osterburken to its highest point at 333 metres above sea level at Eubigheim station before passing through the Eubigheim tunnel under the watershed between the Neckar and the Main drainage basins. As far as Königshofen the line runs along the valley of the Umpfer, which flows into the Tauber in Königshofen. The line continues along the river, sharing its tracks with the Tauber Valley Railway as far as Lauda.

While the Tauber Valley Railway continues down the valley, the Franconian line crosses the river and follows the Grünbach and the Wittigbach streams, passing through the Wittighausen tunnel to shorten the route along the Wittigbach stream. The line passes through Gaubüttelbrunn station, which is still in Baden-Wuerttemberg, although the actual village of Gaubüttelbrunn is across the border in Bavaria. From Geroldshausen the line descends to Würzburg-Heidingsfeld on the Main river, where it joins the Treuchtlingen-Würzburg line and then crosses the river and continues to Würzburg.

== History ==
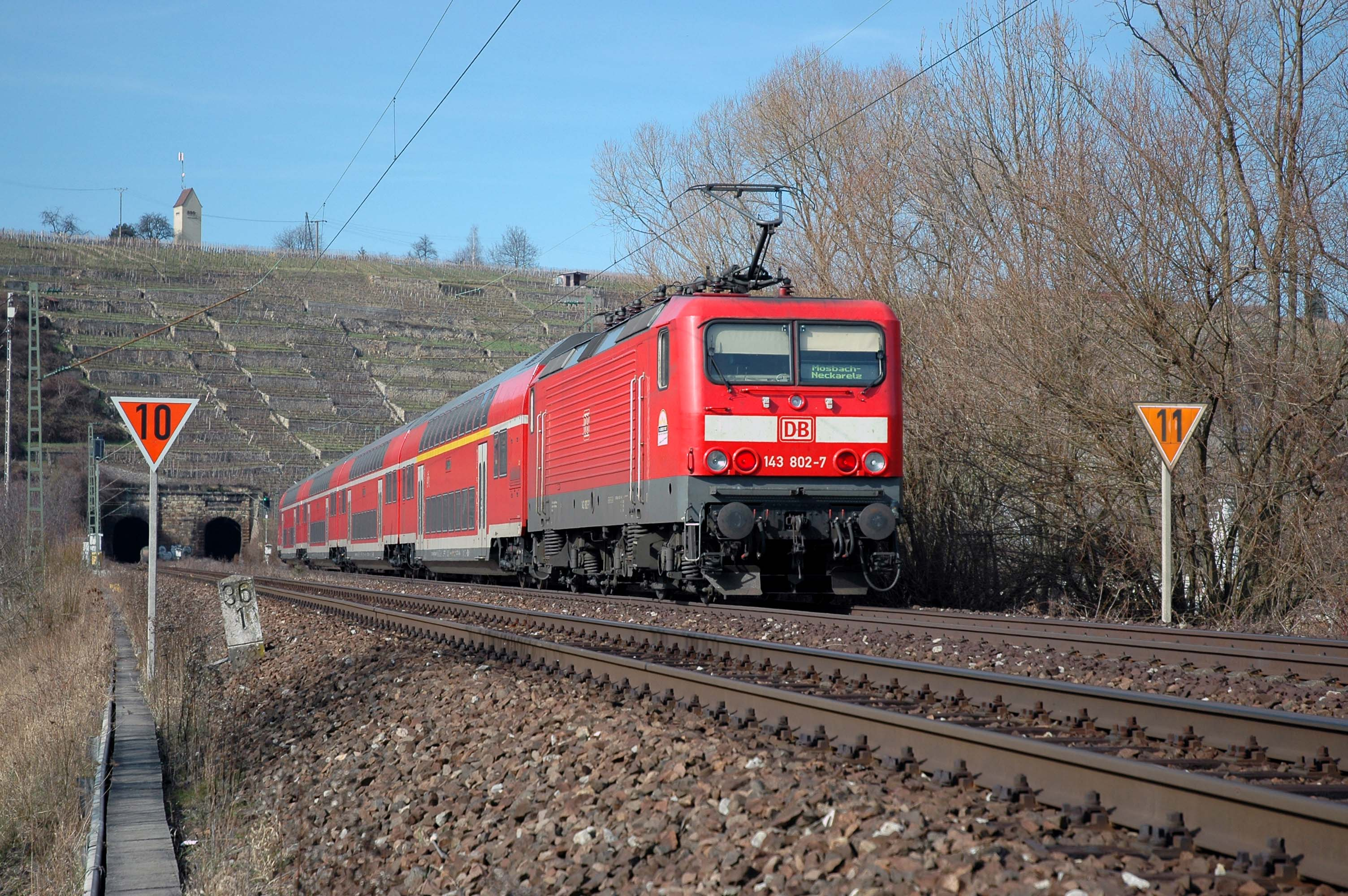
Regionalbahn from Stuttgart in front of the Kirchheim Tunnel

The Franconian line was historically formed mainly from three different lines. The section between Stuttgart and Heilbronn was part of the Württemberg Central Railway or Northern Railway, which was built by the Royal Württemberg State Railways between 1844 and 1848. The section from Bad Cannstatt (near Stuttgart) to Ludwigsburg was opened on 22 October 1845 and it was extended to Bietigheim on 11 October 1847. The first section of the current Franconia Railway opened from Bietigheim to Heilbronn on 25 July 1848. The Grand Duchy of Baden State Railway built its Odenwald Railway (Odenwaldbahn) between 1862 and 1866 from Heidelberg via Mosbach and Osterburken to Würzburg. As part of a treaty between Baden and Württemberg, concluded in 1864, a link between the two lines was built, which was also referred to as the Lower Jagst Railway. It was built by Württemberg from Heilbronn via Jagstfeld to Osterburken and opened between 1866 and 1869.

The importance of this line used to be much greater. In the period before the Second World War it was served by several important trains between Stuttgart and Berlin, and after 1945, between Stuttgart and Hamburg, as it was the shortest route between both pairs of cities. For example, the line was served in 1934 by the following pairs of trains:

- D 11/12 Stuttgart–Berlin Anhalt station
- D 13/14 Schaffhausen–Berlin Anhalt station, with coaches from Rome
- D 15/16 Stuttgart–Berlin Anhalt station

After the Second World War, the line—along with many other important lines in Germany—was electrified. However, subsequently many of the line's stations—particularly between Osterburken and Lauda—were abandoned for lack of profitability. Since the line has many curves, top speeds are limited and it lost its utility for regularly scheduled long-distance service. Thus the InterRegio train "Rennsteig", which ran from Stuttgart to Erfurt, and the last remaining planned long-distance train on the Franconian line, was closed for the new timetable in 2001. From July 2024 through December 2024, the line briefly hosted scheduled Intercity service for the train pair IC 118/IC 119 (Innsbruck Hbf – Berlin Ostbahnhof) while the Riedbahn was closed between Mannheim and Frankfurt (Main) for major rehabilitation work.

== Operations ==
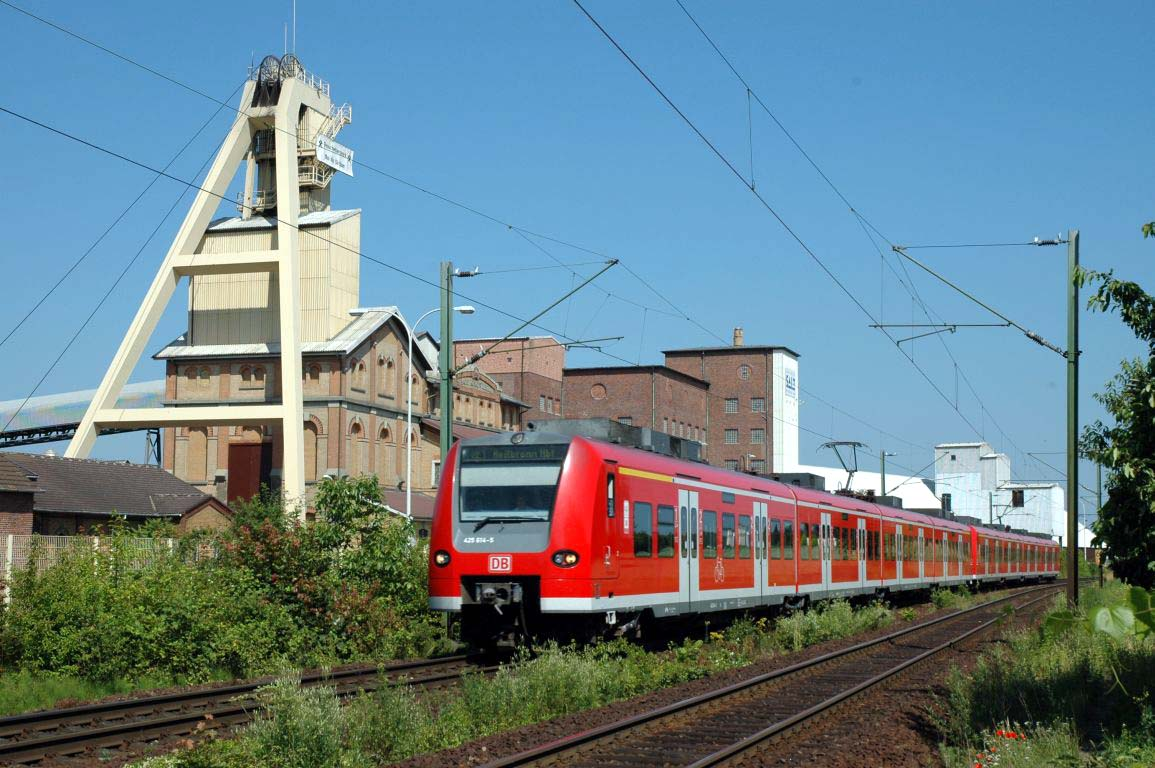
Regional-Express from Mannheim before salt works at Bad Friedrichshall-Kochendorf

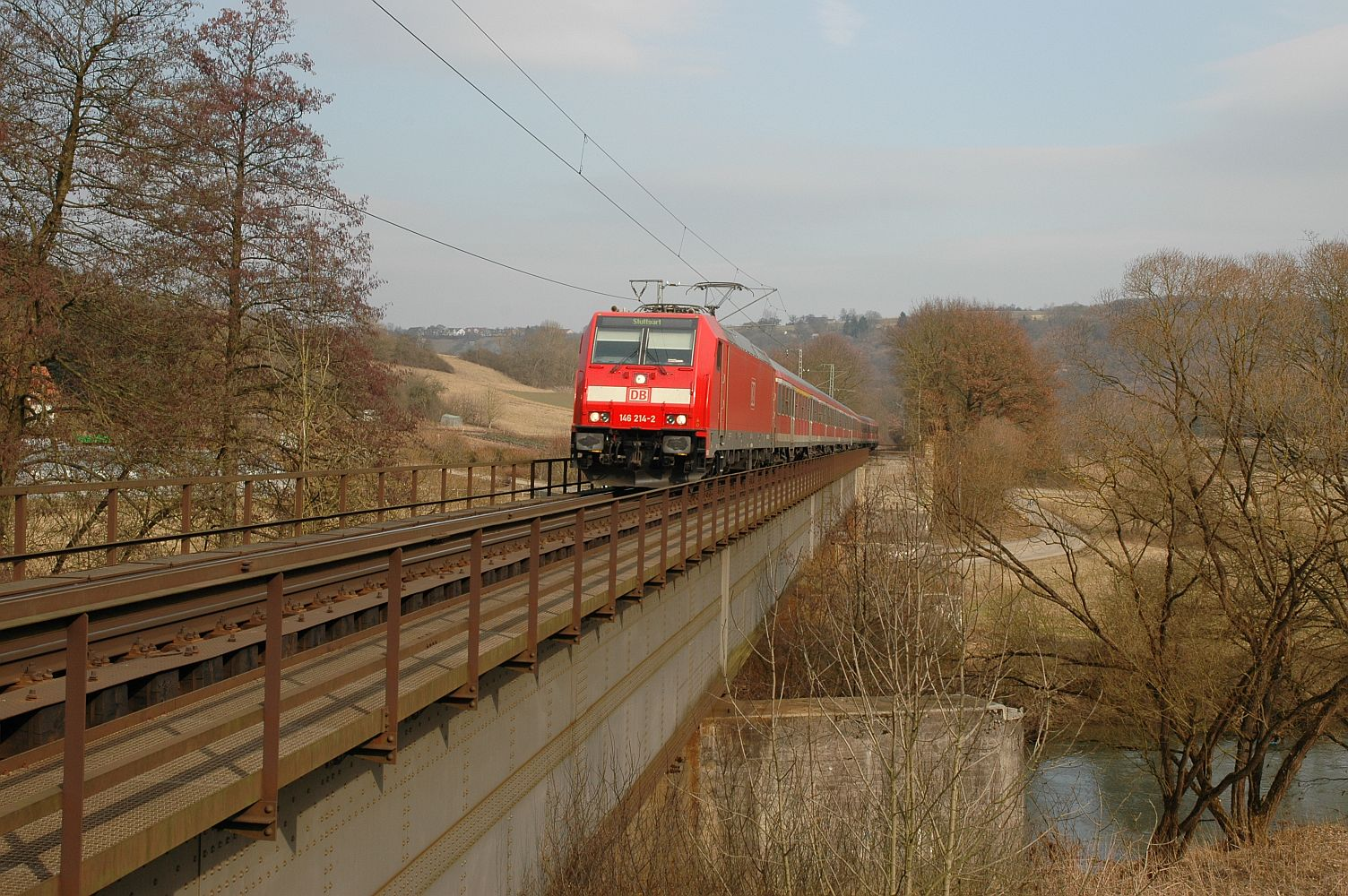
Regional-Express on the single track Jagst bridge

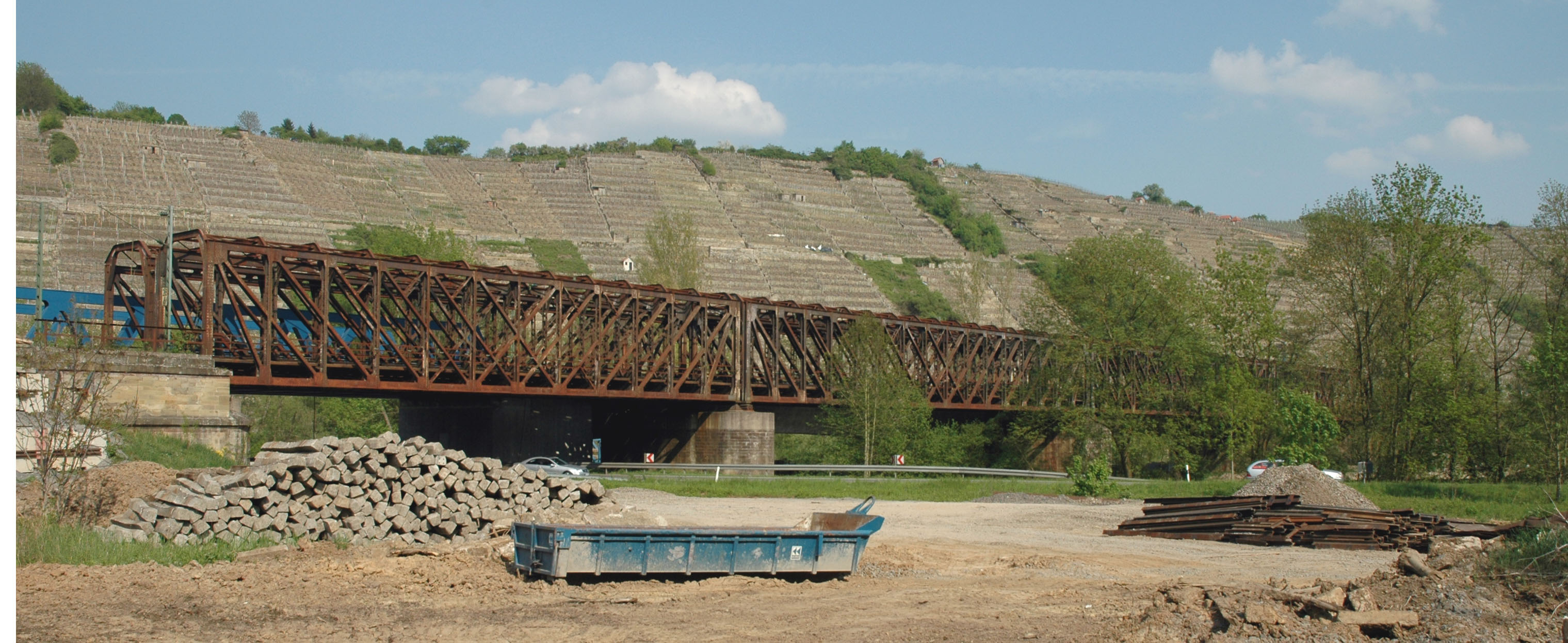
Old (front) and new (rear) Enz bridge just before removal of the old bridge (May 2006)

The whole line is currently served by Regional-Express trains at two-hour intervals, which are supplemented by some additional services. On the Stuttgart–Bietigheim-Bissingen section, it is integrated in the network of the Stuttgart S-Bahn as line S5. Regionalbahn trains run between Stuttgart and Mosbach-Neckarelz (via the Neckar Valley Railway from Bad Friedrichshall-Jagstfeld), as well as on the Heilbronn–Osterburken section. Between Lauda and Würzburg class 628 diesel multiple unit run at two-hour intervals, operated by WestFrankenBahn as Regionalbahn services.

=== Upgrading ===
The Franconian line is almost continuously built with double track; only a 3.7 km section in the bridge over the Jagst between Züttlingen and Möckmühl is currently single track. Duplication of this section would make a better schedule possible and reduce delays. Implementation is estimated to cost €22.3 million and is currently the subject of a dispute between the state of Baden-Württemberg and DB Netz, the operator of the rail infrastructure.

In 1874, a 221-metre-long (725 ft) truss bridge was opened over the Enz and the B 27 between Bietigheim-Bissingen and Besigheim. As a result of its dilapidation, it could only be crossed at a low speed. Between 2004 and 2006 it was replaced by a new 205-metre-long (673 ft) bridge built next to the old bridge consisting of a five-span prestressed concrete box girder bridge and a steel truss navigable aqueduct. Due to geological instability, a 130-metre-long (430 ft) section of the line towards Besigheim had to be reinforced with pile foundations that were more than 40 m deep. A prestressed concrete panel was built along the embankment to reduce noise emissions. In December 2005, the first northbound track connected to the new bridge, and it was completed in June 2006. The old structure was dismantled and scrapped and the immediate natural environment was restored. The cost for the new bridge amounted to around €17 million.

The line was electrified from the south in stages from 1959 to 1975.
