= Vorbach (Tauber, Weikersheim) =

River in Germany

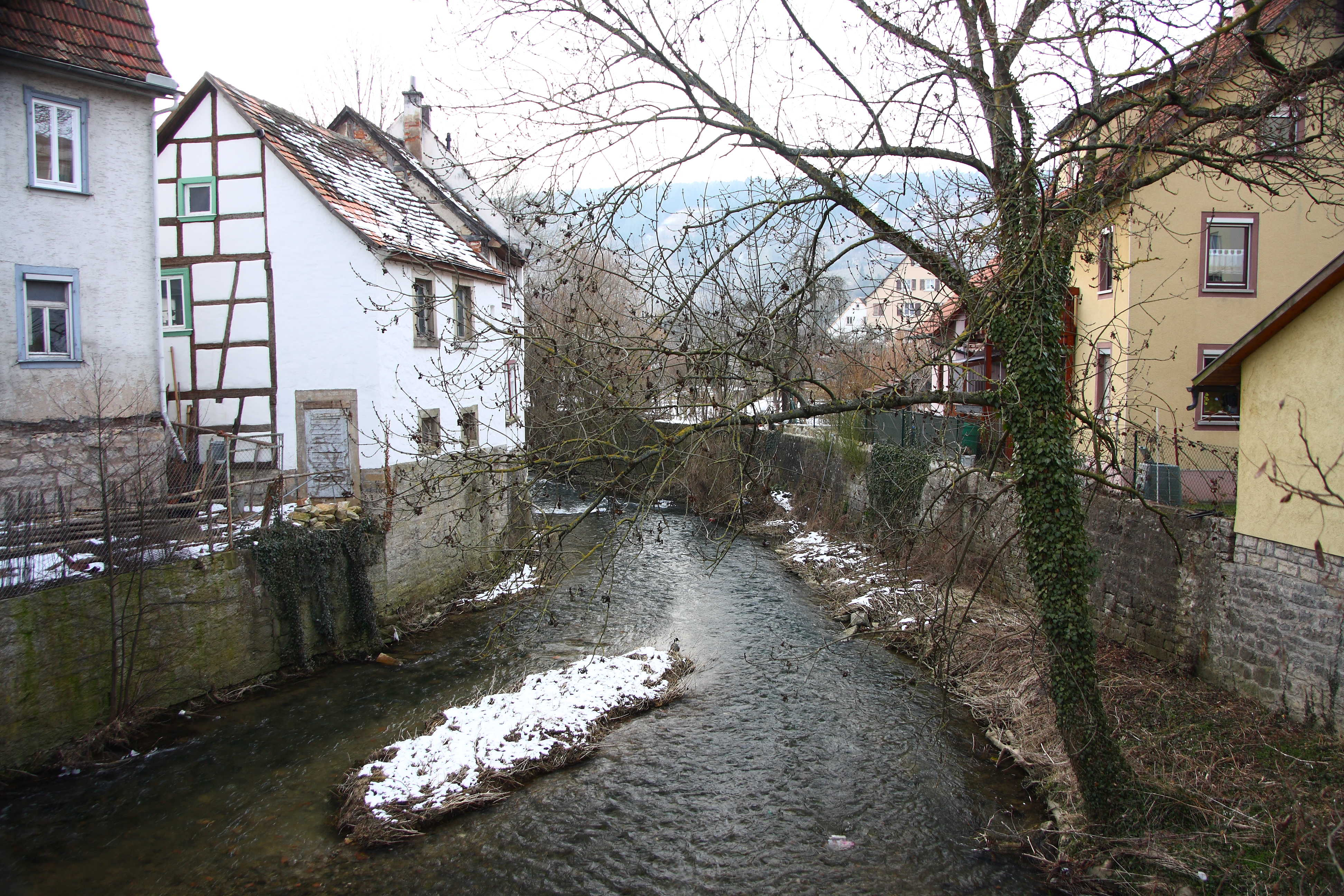

Location
- Country: Germany
- State: Baden-Württemberg

Physical characteristics
- Mouth
  - location: Tauber
  - coordinates: 49°28′58″N 9°53′51″E
- Length: 24.7 km (15.3 mi)

Basin features
- Progression: Tauber→ Main→ Rhine→ North Sea

Vorbach is a river of Baden-Württemberg, Germany. It is a left tributary of the Tauber at Weikersheim.

== See also ==
- List of rivers of Baden-Württemberg
