= DB Bahn =

Logo

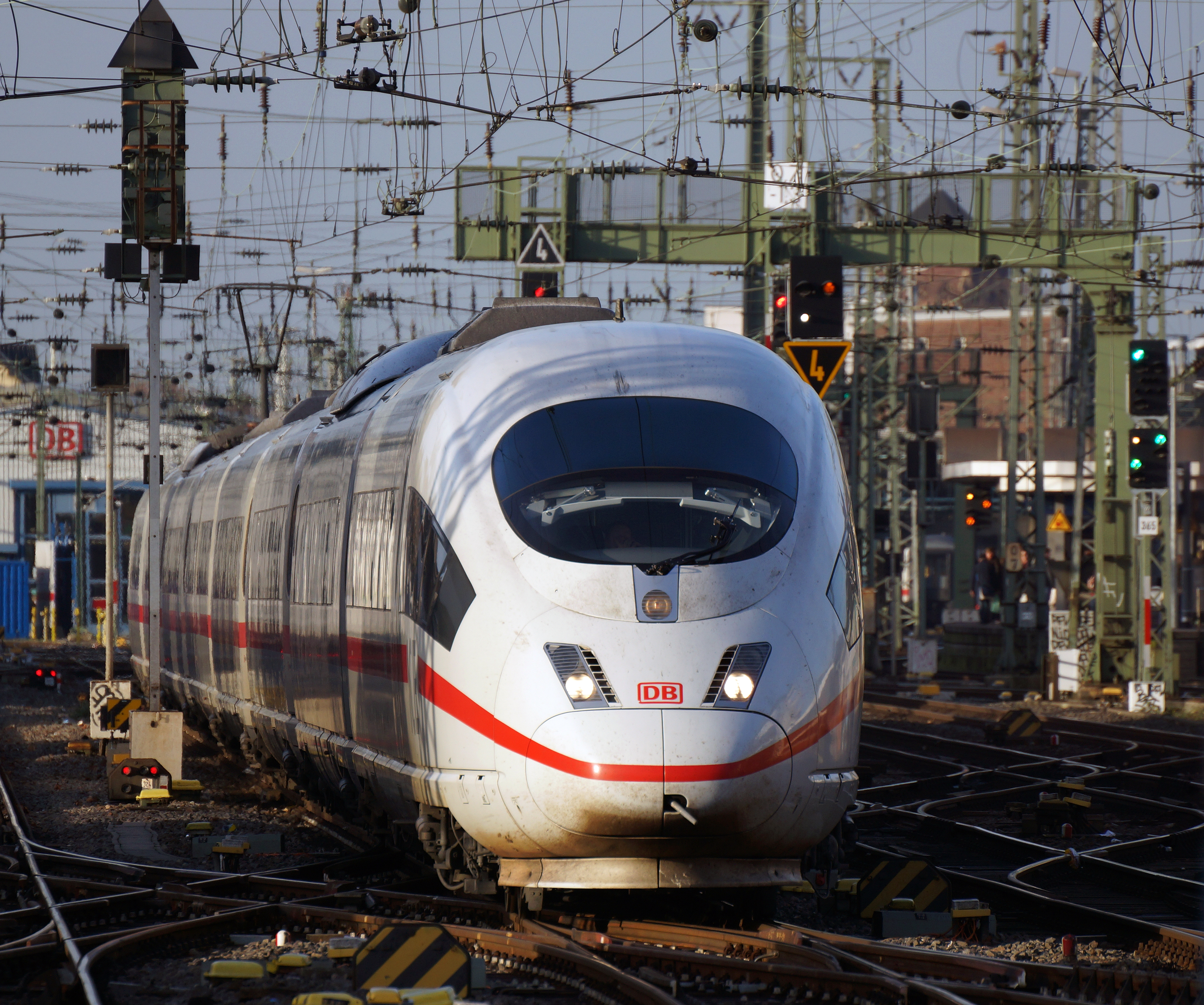
DB Ice 3

From December 2007 to the beginning of 2016, DB Bahn (German pronunciation: [deːbeː ˈbaːn], "DB Railway") was one of three brands of Deutsche Bahn alongside DB Schenker and DB Netze.

It included all DB mobility services and was dissolved in 2015 as part of a reorganisation of the DB Group brands.
