= Tauber =

River in Germany

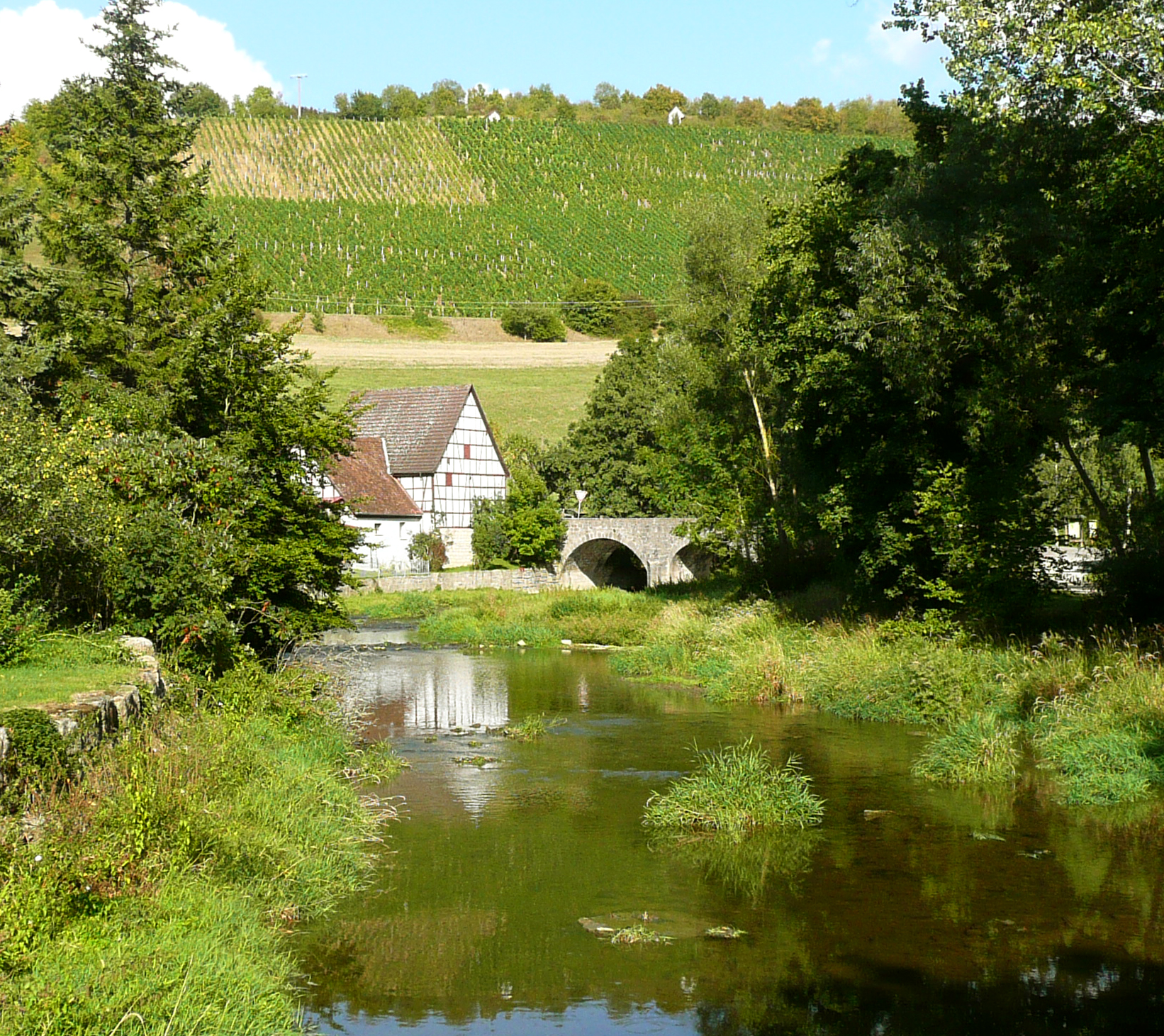
- The Tauber and the vineyards between Rothenburg and Creglingen

Location
- Country: Germany
- States: Baden-Württemberg; Bavaria
- Reference no.: DE: 246

Physical characteristics
- Source
  - location: near Weikersholz
  - coordinates: 49°15′00″N 10°06′53″E
  - elevation: 447 m above sea level (NN)
- Mouth
  - location: near Wertheim am Main into the Main
  - coordinates: 49°45′48″N 9°30′49″E
  - elevation: 136 m above sea level (NN)
- Length: 131.7 km (81.8 mi)
- Basin size: 1,809 km^{2} (698 sq mi)
- Discharge
  - location: at Bockenfeld Gauge
  - average: 0.63 m^{3}/s (22 cu ft/s)
- Discharge
  - location: Archshofen
  - average: 2.64 m^{3}/s (93 cu ft/s)
- Discharge
  - location: Bad Mergentheim
  - average: 6.94 m^{3}/s (245 cu ft/s)
- Discharge
  - location: Tauberbischofsheim
  - average: 9.90 m^{3}/s (350 cu ft/s)

Basin features
- Progression: Main→ Rhine→ North Sea
- Landmarks: Large towns: Bad Mergentheim, Wertheim am Main; Small towns: Rothenburg ob der Tauber, Creglingen, Röttingen, Weikersheim, Lauda-Königshofen, Tauberbischofsheim

The Tauber (German: [ˈtaʊbɐ]) is a river in Franconia (Baden-Württemberg and Bavaria), Germany. It is a left tributary of the Main and is 132 km (82 mi) in length. The name derives from the Celtic word for water (compare: Dover).

== Course ==
It flows through Rothenburg ob der Tauber, Creglingen, Weikersheim, Bad Mergentheim, Königshofen, Tauberbischofsheim, and flows into the river Main in Wertheim am Main. The Tauber Valley Cycleway is a bicycle path which runs about 101 km along the course of the river.

There is a medieval bridge over the river near Rothenburg ob der Tauber.

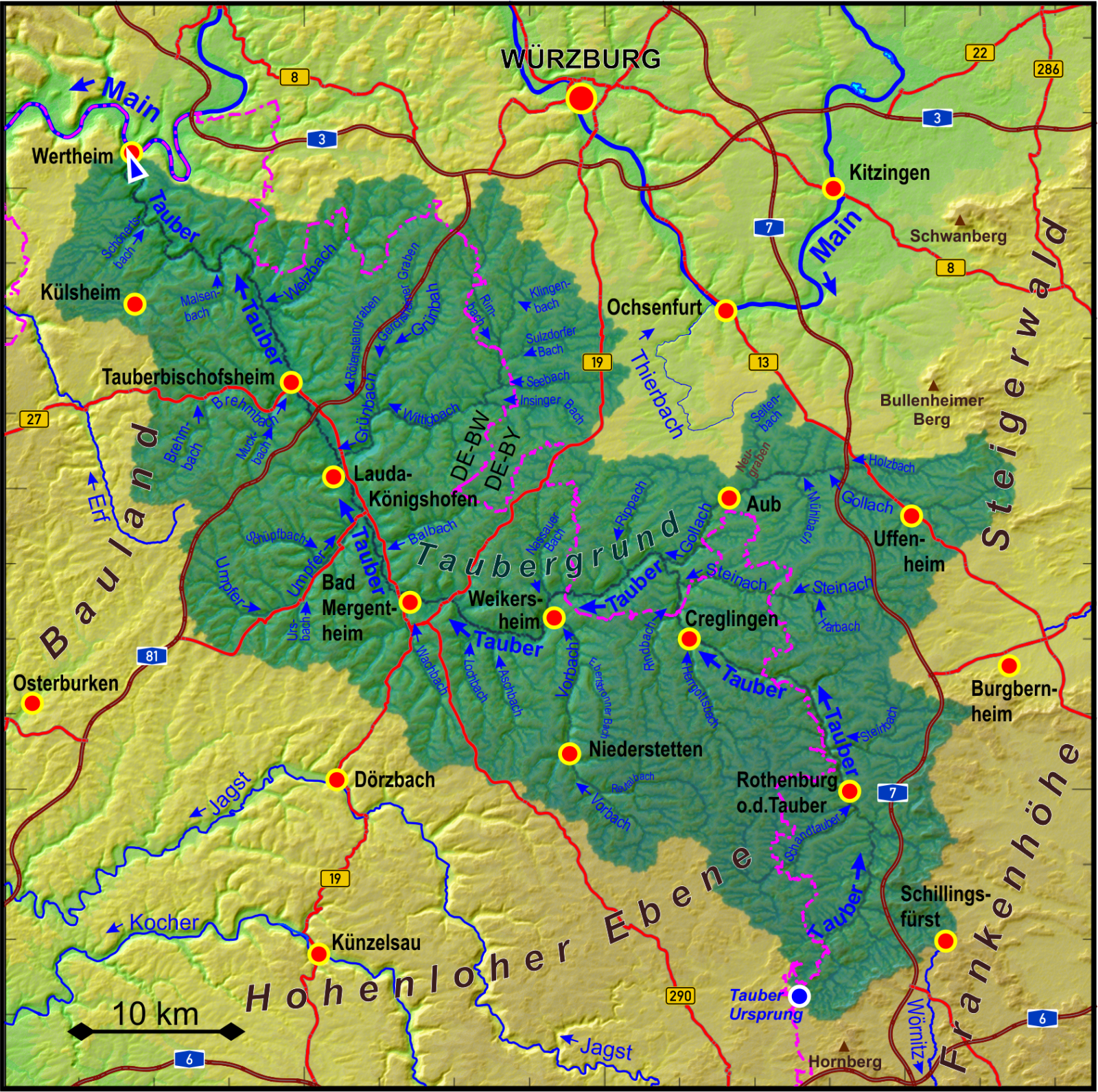
Catchment area of the Tauber river

== See also ==
- List of rivers of Baden-Württemberg
- List of rivers of Bavaria
