= Neckarelz–Osterburken railway =

Railway line in Germany

Mosbach-Neckarelz–Osterburken
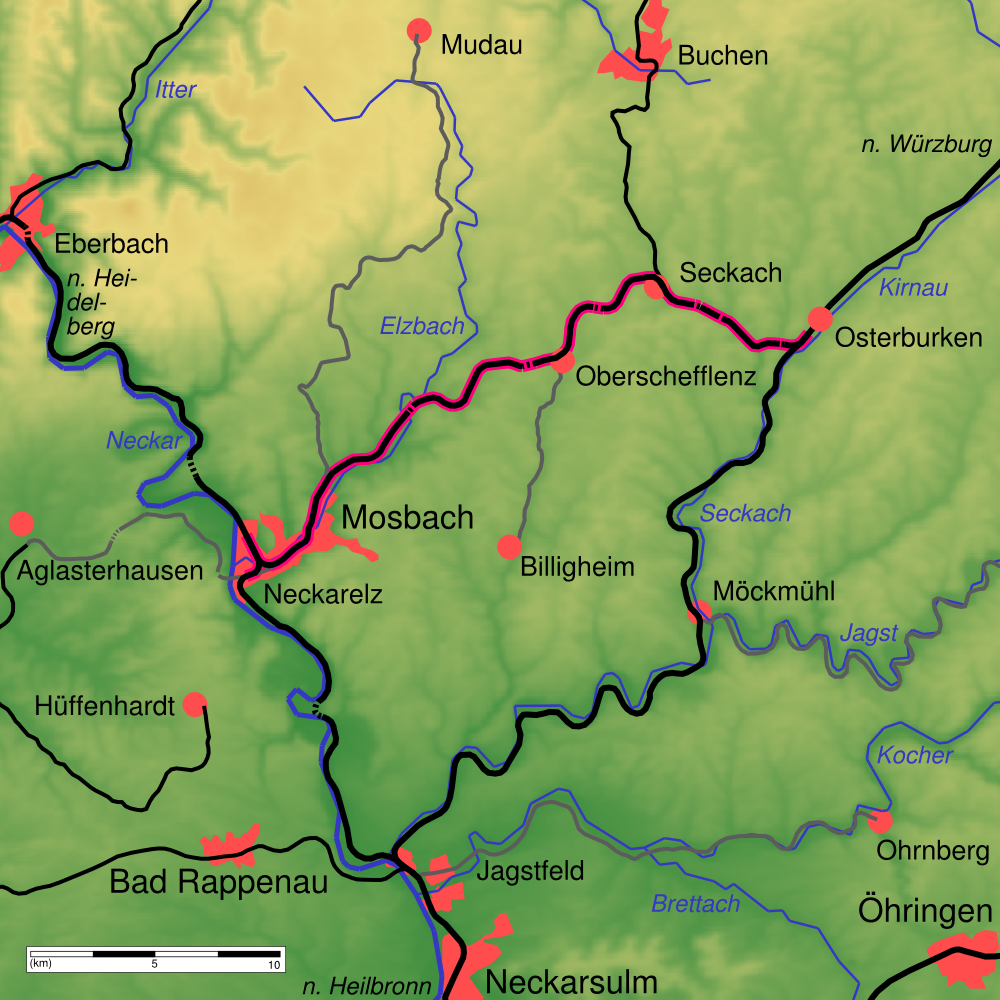

Overview
- Line number: 4120
- Locale: Baden-Württemberg, Germany

Service
- Route number: 665.1-2 (until 2003: 708)

Technical
- Line length: 30.9 km (19.2 mi)
- Track gauge: 1,435 mm (4 ft 8 1/2 in) standard gauge
- Minimum radius: 252 m (827 ft)
- Electrification: 15 kV/16.7 Hz AC catenary
- Operating speed: 95km/h (max)
- Maximum incline: 1.7%

The Neckarelz–Osterburken railway is a 30.9 km long railway line in the north of the German state of Baden-Württemberg, which connects the Neckar and the Bauland along the edge of the Odenwald. It was opened in 1866 as part of the Odenwald Railway (Baden) (Odenwaldbahn) between Heidelberg and Würzburg. It has been upgraded to form an entirely double-track and electrified main line railway. It was an east–west axis for German long-distance transport until 1945. Since 2003 passenger services on it have been operated by the Rhine-Neckar S-Bahn. The Neckarelz–Mosbach section has also been served by the Heilbronn Stadtbahn since 2014.

== Route ==
The track today starts at Mosbach-Neckarelz station, where the Neckar Valley Railway branches off. Until about 1960 there was a connecting curve from Mosbach to Hochhausen on the Neckar Valley Railway. Until 1895, the old route of the Odenwald Railway from Obrigheim connected before the line reaches the current site of the Mosbach station, which was built in 1997. The line leaves the Neckar Valley, running along the Elz and Auerbach rivers, to enter an area of karst landscape known as the Bauland. A loop of the Elz is shortened by the Dallau tunnel.

The line tunnels under the watershed between the Elz and the Jagst through Schefflenz Tunnel to reach the Schefflenz valley. It runs through Eicholzheim tunnel to the Seckach valley and in Seckach connects with the Madonnenland Railway to Miltenberg. The line runs through Adelsheim tunnel to the Kirnau valley, where it connects with the Franconia Railway in Osterburken.

The line runs parallel with federal Highway B 27 from Neckarelz to Auerbach and then the B 292 to Oberschefflenz.

== History ==
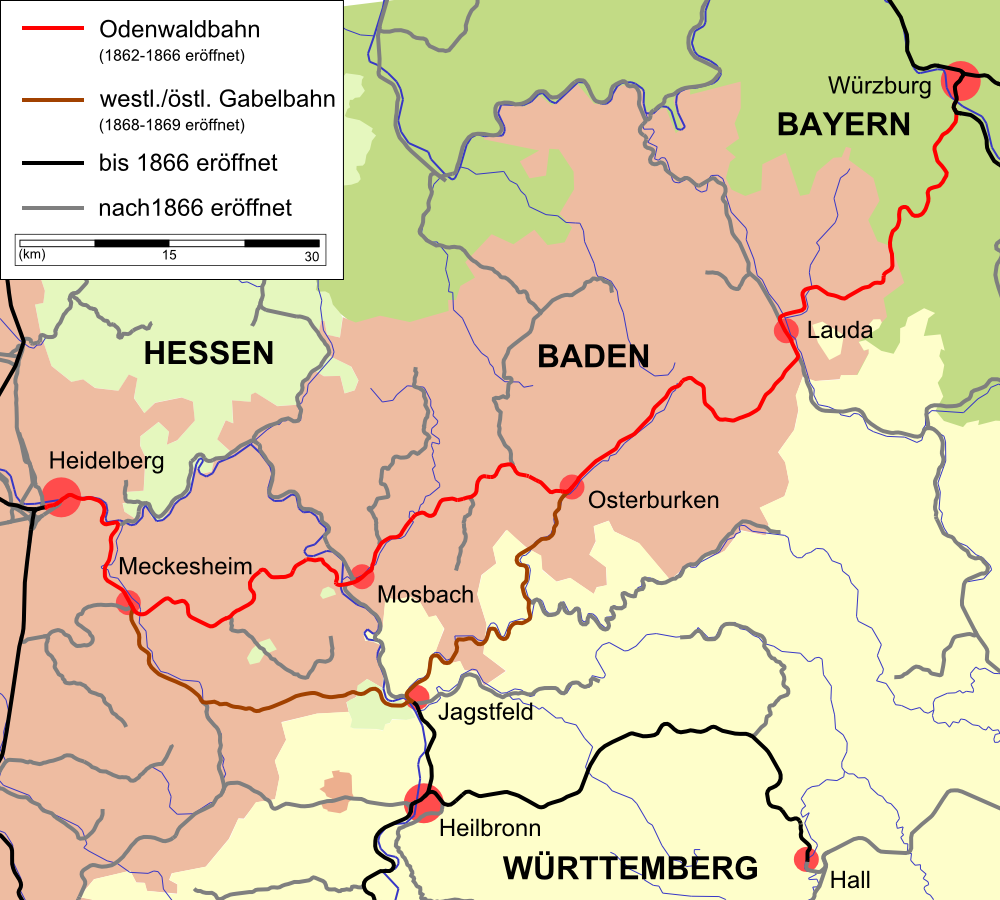
Historical route of the Odenwald Railway

The Neckarelz–Osterburken railway was developed as part of the Odenwald Railway from Heidelberg to Würzburg, which was completed on 1 November 1866. Heidelberg was connected to the railway network by the Grand Duchy of Baden State Railway’s Rhine Valley Railway in 1840. In 1854 the Ludwig's Western Railway was opened from Bamberg in Bavaria to the Hessian border near Kahl am Main through Würzburg. Both Bavaria and Baden saw reasons to build a railway line between Heidelberg and Würzburg: the government of Baden sought a continuation of its main line to the north east and the Bavarian king, Maximilian II, sought a connection with the Palatinate, then a geographically separate part of Bavaria.

The shortest route between the two cities would have run via Eberbach, Mudau and Miltenberg through Hesse, which saw this route as being opposed to its own interests. Instead, after a review of 45 alternative routes and lengthy negotiations, a decision was taken to build a line through Meckenheim, Mosbach, Osterburken and Lauda. This had the advantage for Baden that the line opened up the Baden Bauland and that it could operate entirely within Baden, as it only reached Bavaria at the end of the line. The disadvantages that had to be taken into account were an unfavourable topography and a route that was 25 km longer than the shortest route. A treaty adopting the agreed route was signed between the two countries on 27 January 1862. The Mosbach–Osterburken section was put into operation on 25 August 1866.

=== Baden State Railways era (1866-1920) ===
Four years after the start of operations on the line, the Franco-Prussian War of 1870/1871 used its capacity in full. With Baden entering the war on 16 July 1870 the line was part of the military infrastructure. From 28 July 1870 until 15 October 1871 it was a military line. There was one pair of civilian passenger trains each day; all other capacity was made available for military traffic.

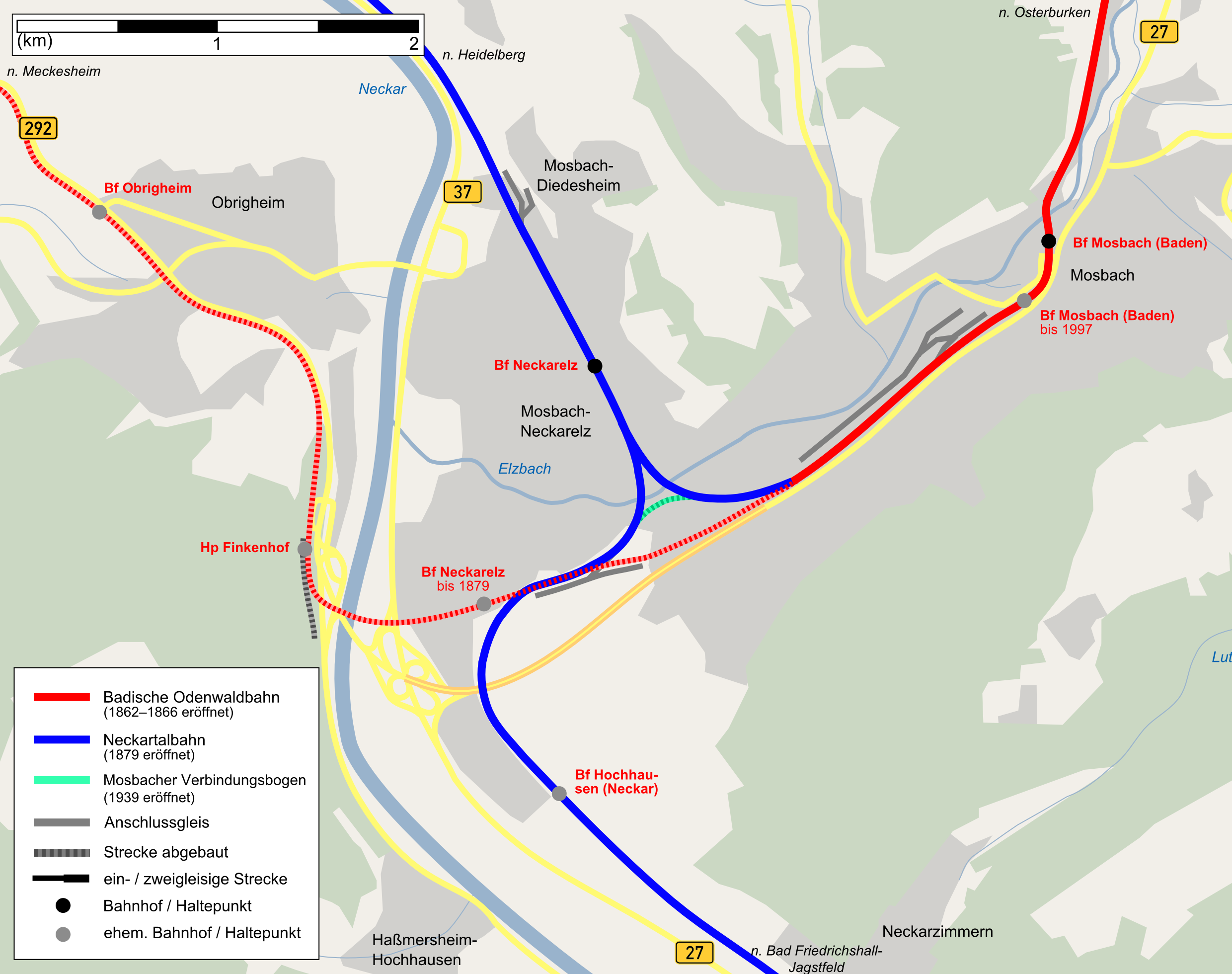
Development of the rail network near Mosbach

After the end of the war, Baden, Hesse and Württemberg agreed to the construction of the Neckar Valley Railway from Neckargemünd via Neckarelz to Jagstfeld and on 24 May 1879 rail traffic between Heidelberg and Mosbach followed the Neckar and avoided the topographically difficult Odenwald Railway. Therefore, a relocation of Neckarelz station was necessary: the old station was built at the end of the bridge over the Neckar on the Odenwald Railway, the new station was built on the new line along the Neckar river. From the new station two curves were built to Mosbach and to the Meckenheim line. The old Odenwald Railway between the old railway station and Mosbach remained in place, but in 1895 it was considered unnecessary and was abandoned.

Duplication of the line together with the Neckar Valley Railway between Neckargemünd and Neckarelz began in 1904 and was completed on 29 April 1906.

=== Deutsche Reichsbahn era (1920-1949) ===
In the mid-1920s Deutsche Reichsbahn further upgraded the line: the bridges were reinforced to increase permissible axle loads. Furthermore, additional passing tracks were built. On 20 December 1939, the Mosbach connecting curve (Mosbacher Verbindungsbogen) was opened in Neckarelz between the Neckar Valley Railway from the south and the line to Osterburken. This relieved congestion on the Lower Jagst Railway (the section of the Franconia Railway between Bad Friedrichshall-Jagstfeld and Osterburken) created by the operation of Iko-Verkehr (a contraction of “Italy coal transport”) trains.

During the air war over Germany the line—as opposed to the Neckarelz railway junction—was not a prime target of Allied attacks. Only from September 1944 were there frequent service interruptions. On 30 November 1944 Seckach station was the objective of an air attack which injured one person and destroyed two locomotives.

After the war operations on the railway between Neckarelz and Osterburken were resumed in June 1945, as the line had great importance as a supply route for the occupation of the American zone.

=== Deutsche Bundesbahn era (1949–1993) ===
The Mosbach connecting curve was no longer needed after the Second World War and was closed in about 1960.

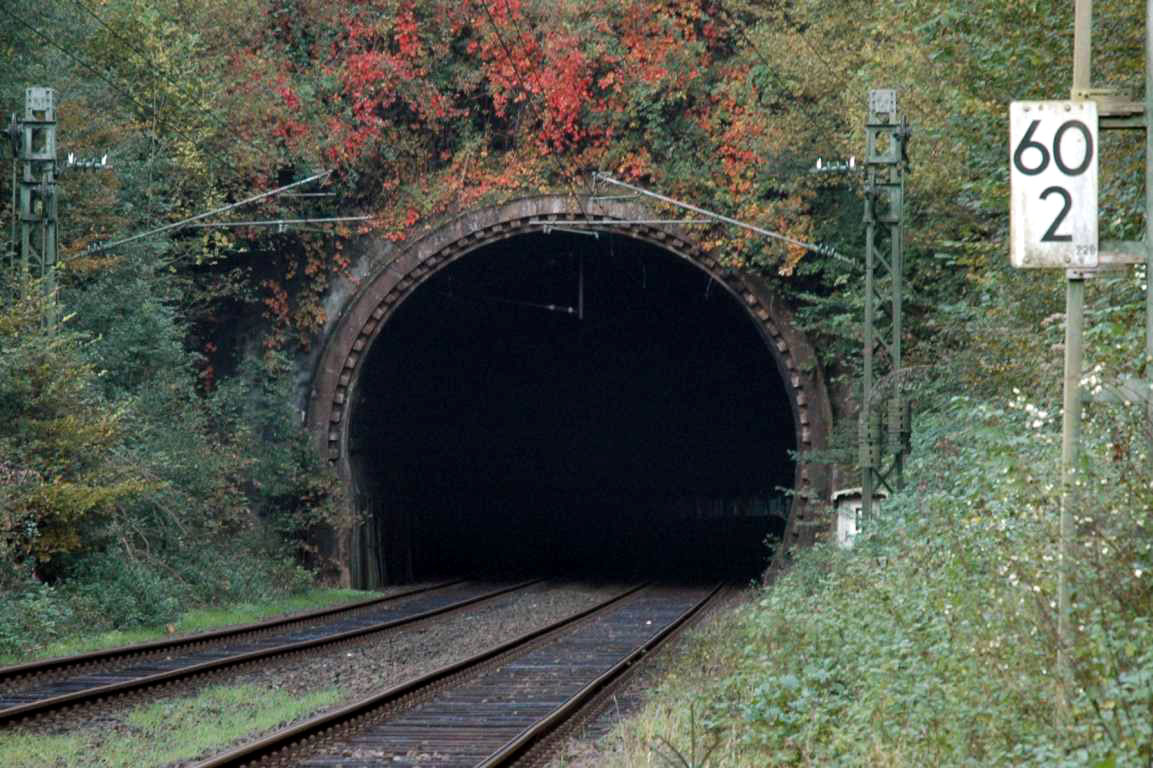
South portal of the Dallau Tunnel (Oct 2007)

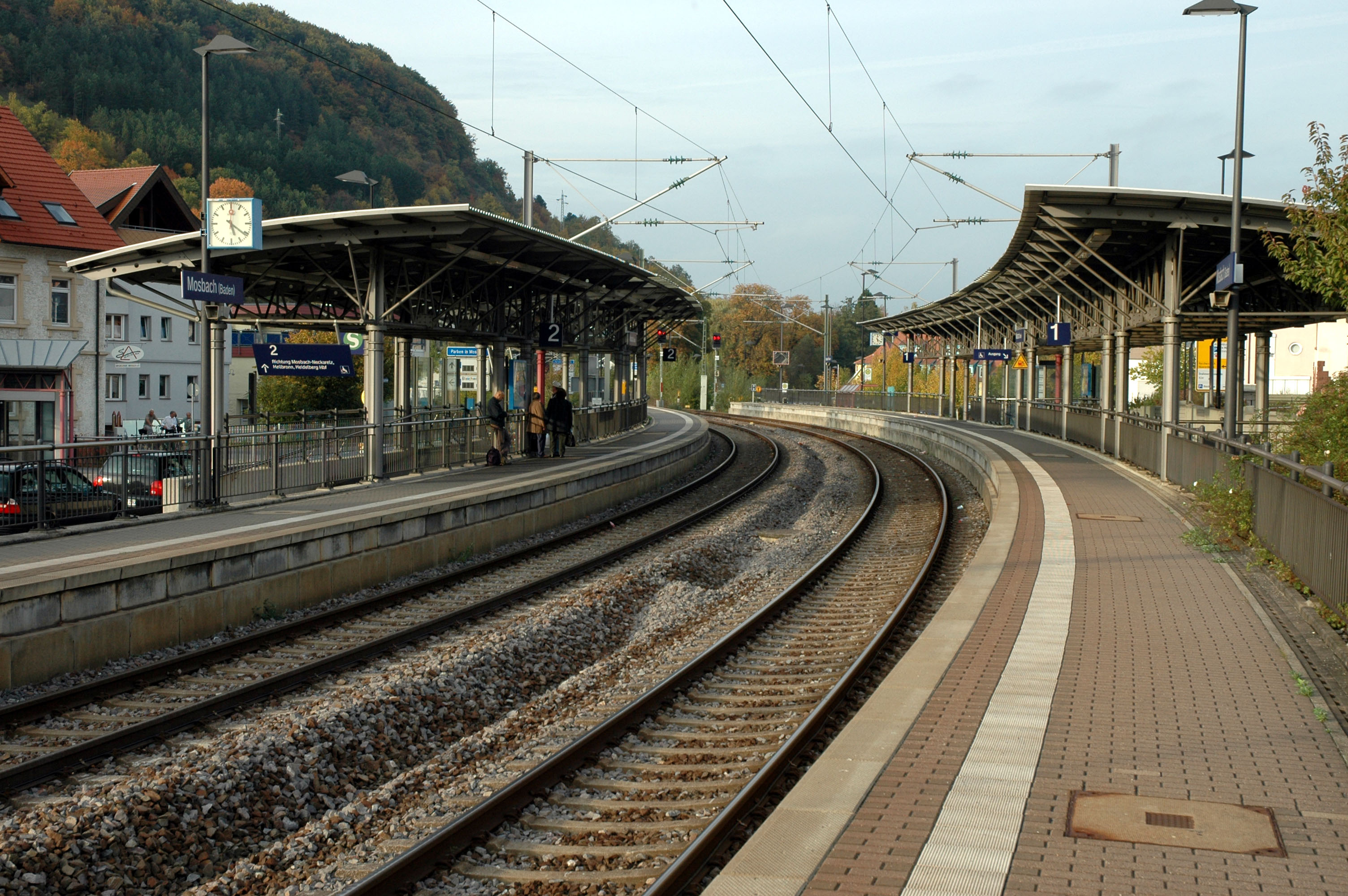
New station in Mosbach (Oct 2007)

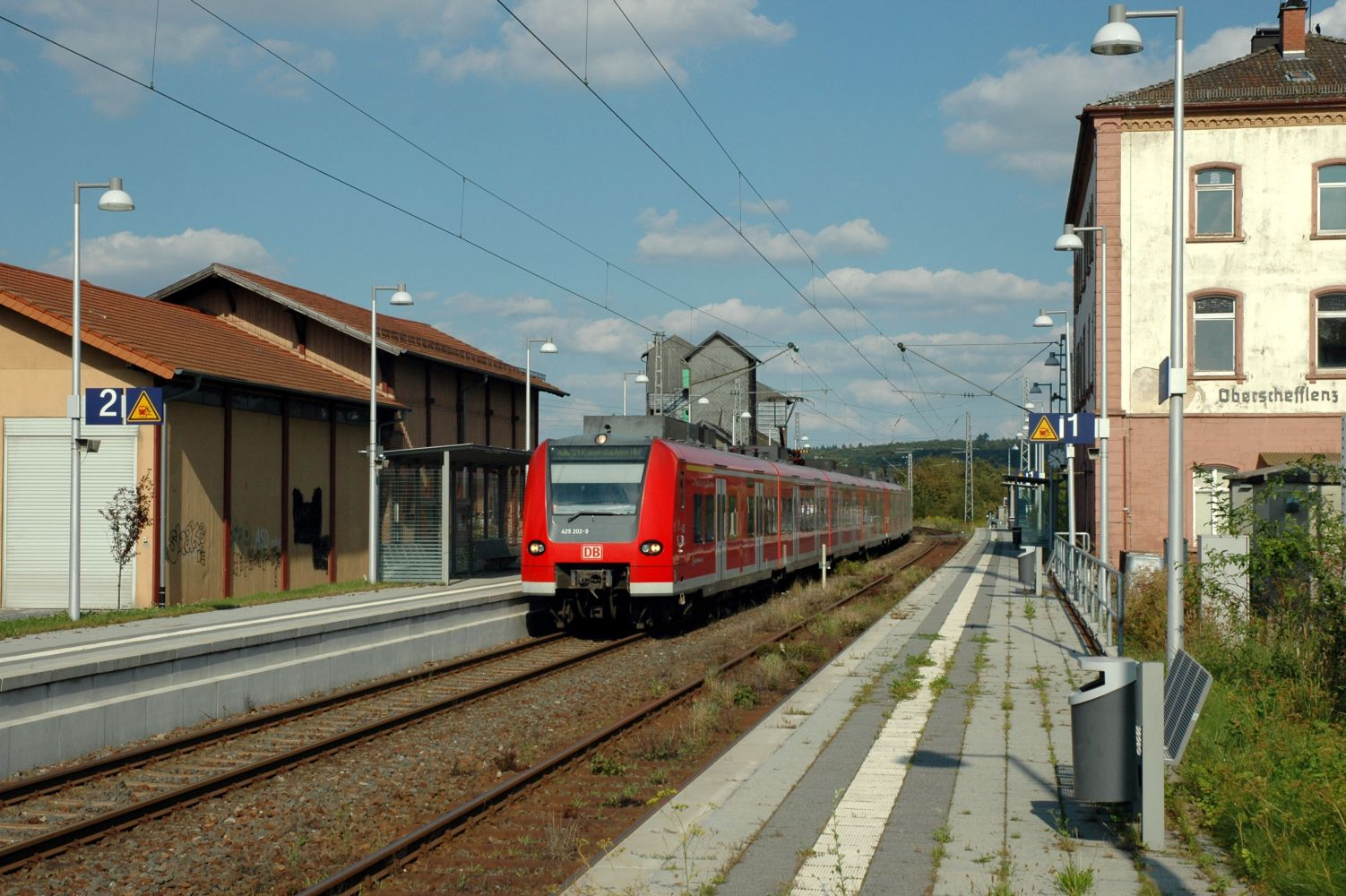
Rhine-Neckar S-Bahn train in Oberschefflenz (Aug 2007)

When, in the early 1970s, Deutsche Bundesbahn electrified the Neckar Valley Railway and the Bad Friedrichshall-Jagstfeld–Würzburg line with financial support from the state of Baden-Württemberg, it was decided to electrify the gap between Neckarelz and Osterburken as well, allowing the continuous electrical operation of freight trains on the Rhine-Neckar–Franconia route. The line had lost its importance for passenger traffic as an east–west route as a result of the division of Germany at the end of the war. Starting with Dallau tunnel, work began on 1 November 1971 on lowering the floor of all tunnels by 32 to 50 centimetres. The nature of the Buntsandstein rock in Dallau Tunnel was difficult and required blasting. The Muschelkalk in the other tunnel also required special care.

Since the clearance of the bridge of the Mosbach-Mudau narrow-gauge railway was insufficient for electrification, this meant the end of the line, which was already threatened with closure. A road bridge, which also constituted an obstacle to electrification, already needed renovation, so only one bridge at Auerbach had to be rebuilt specifically for the electrification. Electric operations commenced on 1 June 1975.

=== Since the reorganisation of the railway in 1994 ===
In the 1990s the nature of the line changed fundamentally with the establishment of the Rhine-Neckar S-Bahn. A preliminary step was the construction of a new Mosbach station. The old station had been unsatisfactory for a long time. First, the station was some distance from the inner city, on the other hand, a level crossing at the station often caused congestion on the B 27. After disagreements between the city of Mosbach and Deutsche Bahn over the transfer of the site of the old station for the upgrading of the B 27, an agreement was reached in 1994 over the use of unused infrastructure. The new station was opened on 24 March 1997 together with the nearby horticultural show. Its two platforms can be reached via ramps. The length of the platforms allows trains with a maximum length of five cars, so only regional transport operations are possible. The platform height of 76 cm allowed for the operation of the S-Bahn's electric multiple units from the beginning. The cost of the construction of the station and relocation of the surrounding streets, amounting to 53.1 million Deutsche Marks, were shared between Deutsche Bahn and the city of Mosbach. The old station was subsequently demolished.

On 23 November 1996, the last semaphore signals along the line were taken out of service. Since that time, the Neckarelz-Osterburken section has been remotely controlled from a new class SpDr interlocking in Neckarelz.

The planning for the Rhine-Neckar S-Bahn network originally envisaged only a service at 30 minutes intervals along the Neckar Valley Railway to Eberbach. An extension to Neckarelz or even Osterburken with a thinner service was put as an extension option in the tender documents. The offer to extend the S-Bahn to Neckarelz, together with an extension from Speyer to Germersheim was accepted at an initial cost of €75 million. Funding for the extension of the S-Bahn to Osterburken was partly derived from federal funds made available to the state of Baden-Württemberg as part of the regionalisation of rail transport in 1996 and from funds made available to municipalities by the state under its municipal finance law. Since 14 December 2003, line S 1 has operated every hour to Osterburken. As part of the S-Bahn extension, all stations were equipped for disabled access and provided with weather protection. 140 meters long and 76 cm high platforms allow level entry to S-Bahn trains. A new Mosbach-West station was also opened.

The S41 line of the Heilbronn Stadtbahn commenced operations at the regular 2014/2015 timetable change on 14 December 2014. This complements the S-Bahn lines S1 and S2 of the Rhine-Neckar S-Bahn on the Mosbach-Neckarelz–Mosbach (Baden) section.
