= Neckar Valley Railway =

Railway line

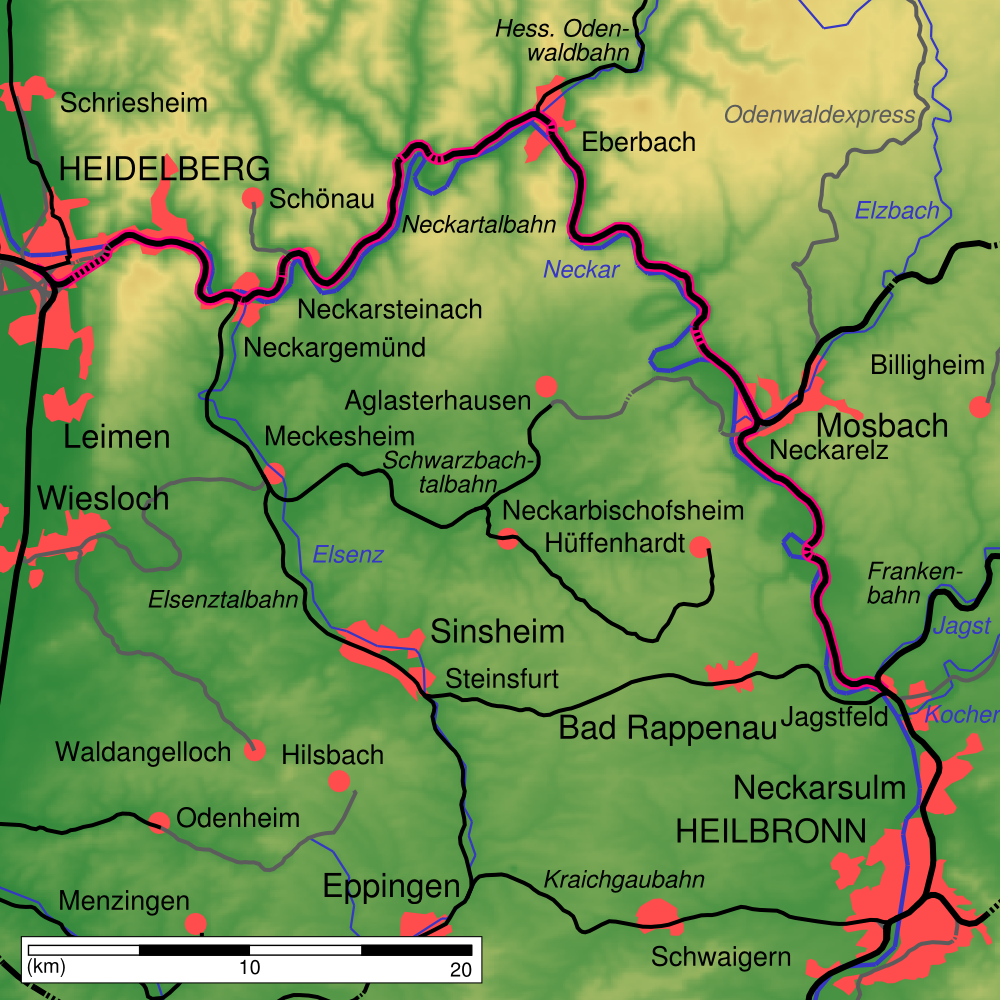

Overview
- Native name: Neckartalbahn
- Status: Operational
- Owner: Deutsche Bahn
- Line number: 4100 (Heidelberg–Karlstor); 4110 (Karlstor–Neckargemünd); 4111 (Neckargemünd–Jagstfeld)
- Locale: Baden-Württemberg and Hesse, Germany
- Termini: Heidelberg Hbf.; Bad Friedrichshall-Jagstfeld
- Stations: 21

Service
- Type: Heavy rail, Passenger/freight rail Regional rail, Commuter rail
- Route number: 705; 665.1-2 (Rhine-Neckar S-Bahn); 780 (Neckarelz–/WÜ–Stuttgart)
- Operator(s): DB Netz

History
- Opened: Stages between 1862-1879

Technical
- Line length: 70.1 km (43.6 mi)
- Number of tracks: Double track
- Track gauge: 1,435 mm (4 ft 8 1/2 in) standard gauge
- Minimum radius: 300 m (984 ft)
- Electrification: Berlin–Cottbus:15 kV/16.7 Hz AC overhead
- Operating speed: 130 km/h (80.8 mph) (maximum)
- Maximum incline: 1.3 %

The Neckar Valley Railway, or Neckar Valley Main Line (German: Neckartalbahn) is a railway line from Heidelberg via Eberbach and Mosbach to Bad Friedrichshall-Jagstfeld in southwestern Germany. Today it is administered by the Verkehrsverbund Rhein-Neckar (Rhine-Neckar Transport Authority) and is partly worked by the Rhine-Neckar S-Bahn.

== History ==
Situation at the time of the construction of the Neckar Valley Railway

The Heidelberg–Neckargemünd section of the line was built in 1862 as part of the Baden Odenwald Railway (Baden Odenwaldbahn), running from the Heidelberg via Neckargemünd, Meckenheim, Neckarbischofsheim, Aglasterhausen, Obrigheim, Neckarelz, Mosbach, Oberschefflenz, Seckach, Osterburken, Königshofen and Lauda to Würzburg. Construction of the line was authorised by a law of 27 April 1860. The Heidelberg–Neckargemünd section was opened on 23 October 1862.

Although the most obvious option for the route between Neckargemünd and Neckarelz would have been to build the line along the Neckar, this would have meant running through Neckarsteinach and Hirschhorn, which were on the territory of the Grand Duchy of Hesse, so a hillier and longer route to the south was selected.

About ten years later, as a result of the Franco-Prussian War, the affected states became part of the German Empire, so it was agreed to build the Neckargemünd–Neckarsteinach–Eberbach–Neckarelz–Jagstfeld line, which was opened on 24 May 1879. Trains between Heidelberg and Würzburg now run over this line.

=== Further development until 2003 ===
Through trains ran from Heidelberg via the Neckar Valley Railway both towards Würzburg and towards Heilbronn.

A second track was built on the line from Heidelberg to Neckarelz between 1907 and 1914. The line was opened through the Königstuhl tunnel to the new marshalling yard on 2 March 1914.

Between 1920 and 1930, the line was upgraded for higher axle loads.

After the Neckar bridge was blown up in 1945 at the end of World War II, the halt of Neckarbrücke was established near Kleingemünd on 9 March, allowing trains to run to the east. On 23 June 1946 continuous operations were resumed, but initially only over a single track; this meant that trains had to cross at Kleingemünd. Double track was restored on this section on 15 September 1958.

Heidelberg Hauptbahnhof was moved from the city centre to its current location in 1955, which also the course of the Neckar Valley Railway was changed between Heidelberg Hauptbahnhof and Karlstor station. Since then, the Neckar Valley Railway has used the route through the 2487-meter-long Königstuhl Tunnel, which had previously only used freight trains to the Heidelberg marshalling yard. The old tunnels on the outskirts of Heidelberg's Old Town are now used by road traffic (Adenauerplatz–Karlstor); The reconstruction of the Schlossberg and Spital tunnels cost Deutsche Mark (DM) 11.5 million and was approved on 13 September 1968.

From the 1950, many of Deutsche Bundesbahn's main lines were electrified including the Neckar Valley Railway between Heidelberg and Heilbronn. The section to Heidelberg Karlstor was electrified on 22 May 1955. Electrification was completed on 14 September 1972. The first electric services ran from Heidelberg to Stuttgart on 21 September and regular electrical services commenced on 1 October 1972.

The Neckarsteinach signal box was taken out of service on 1 October 1986. On 5 March 1990, Neckarsteinach station was downgraded from a Bahnhof (station) of class 3 to a Haltepunkt (halt).

Until the mid-nineties there was long-distance services on the Neckar Valley Railway, but these have since been completely abandoned. This rail service was last operated as an InterRegio pair between Emden and Stuttgart, after D-Züg services like Amsterdam–Munich or Wilhelmshaven–Lindau had disappeared from the timetable.

In 1983 and 1984, a portion of the Rheingold ran from Mannheim via Heidelberg, Heilbronn and Stuttgart, over the Stuttgart–Nördlingen and Nördlingen–Augsburg lines to Munich. This route was chosen despite the longer times for touristic reasons. The service was cancelled due to low utilisation and the lack of compatibility with the Intercity network.

In early 1996, the track was adapted for DM 18 million for the use of tilting Regional-Express services and equipped with the Geschwindigkeitsüberwachung Neigetechnik (GNT) system. This reduced the travel time from 103 minutes to 68 minutes.

Until the introduction of the new train designations (RE/RB) there were mainly local trains on the line, but also three pairs of Heckeneilzuge ("hedgerow expresses", that is they stopped at all stations on rural sections, but ran as expresses near cities) ran from Frankfurt via Hanau and Erbach to Stuttgart and from Eberbach to Heilbronn over the Neckar Valley Railway.

The line from Heidelberg marshalling yard to Königstuhl junction was closed on 30 November 1997.

=== Since 2003: opening of the Rhine-Neckar S-Bahn and future plans ===
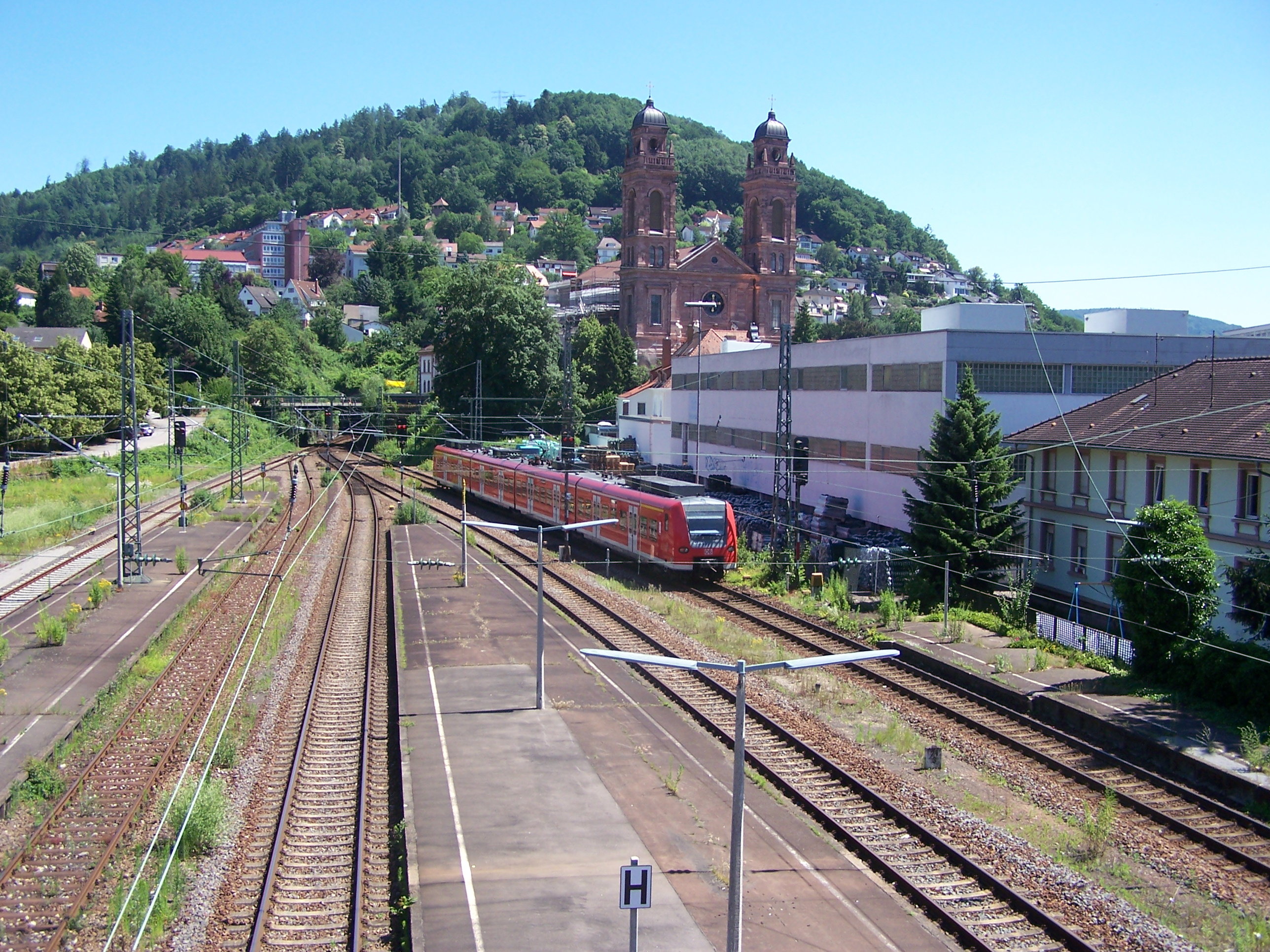
S-Bahn train in Eberbach 2006

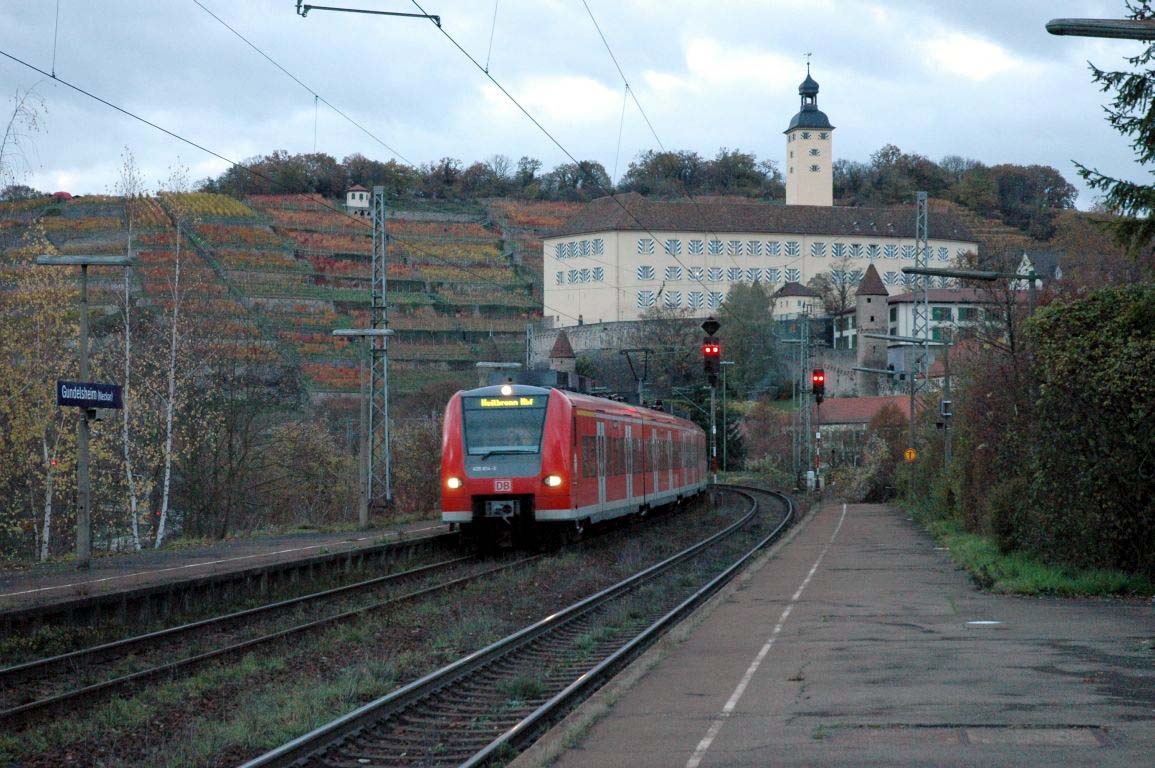
Regional-Express service from Mannheim to Heilbronn in Gundelsheim

Three new stations were opened with the commencement of S-Bahn operations on the Neckar Valley Railway: Heidelberg-Weststadt/Südstadt, Heidelberg-Orthopädie and Neckargemünd-Altstadt. The platform levels of the rest of the stations from Heidelberg to Neckarelz were increased to 76 centimetres to allow level access to the S-Bahn. All platforms have a length of 140 metres.

=== Further development ===
The Mosbach-Neckarelz−Bad Friedrichshall-Jagstfeld−Heilbronn section was incorporated in the network of the Heilbronn Stadtbahn at the regular change to the 2014/2015 timetable on 14 December 2014. The trains of the new S 41 service reverse in Neckarelz station and then run over the Neckarelz–Osterburken railway to Mosbach station.

== Operations ==
=== Vehicle use and station facilities ===
All stations of the Neckar Valley Railway served by the Rhine-Neckar S-Bahn have been rebuilt to provide barrier-free access for the disabled and equipped with protection from the weather. Some major stations (for instance, Eberbach and Neckarelz) were retrofitted with LCD destination displays a few years before the launch of S-Bahn services. Increasing the platforms to 76 cm above the running surface made possible a level entrance to the class 425.2 S-Bahn electric multiple units. The following rolling stock are used:

- Class 111 locomotives with Silberling carriages on RE3 services between Mannheim and Heilbronn (some trains on weekdays)
- Class 425.1 and 425.4 electric multiple units on RE3 services between Mannheim and Heilbronn
- class 425.2 electric multiple units on S-Bahn services.
- class ET 2010 (occasionally GT8-100D/2S) on the Heilbronn–Mosbach Stadtbahn services.

=== Passenger services ===
During the day services on the line run hourly on lines S1 (Homburg (Saar)–Kaiserslautern–Mannheim–Heidelberg–Osterburken) and S2 (Kaiserslautern–Mannheim–Heidelberg (on weekdays starting or ending at Eberbach or Mosbach) of the Rhine-Neckar S-Bahn and every two hours Regional-Express services operate on the Mannheim–Eberbach–Heilbronn route. The start or end of some of these RE services on Saturdays, Sundays and public holidays is at Stuttgart. While S2 services end on alternative hours in Eberbach or Mosbach, S1 services run every hour to Osterburken to give good connections to the trains on the Franconia Railway between Stuttgart and Würzburg.

Until 13 December 2014, Regionalbahn services ran between Neckarelz and Bad Friedrichshall-Jagstfeld on the Neckarelz–Stuttgart–Ulm route each hour. These services mostly used double-deck carriages. On occasion and in the peak hours Silberling carriages were used. The double-deck carriages were hauled almost exclusively by class 146.2 electric locomotives. The Silberling carriages were hauled by Class 111 electric locomotives. All the locomotives used for Regionalbahn services on this line were based in Stuttgart.

The RB services were replaced on 14 December 2014 by Stadtbahn services on line S 41 every hour between Heilbronn station forecourt, central Heilbronn, Neckarsulm, Bad Friedrichshall, Mosbach-Neckarelz (with reversal) and Mosbach (Baden). In addition, hourly Stadtbahn services run between Mosbach (Baden) and Mosbach-Neckarelz to connect with the RE3 (Mannheim–Bad Friedrichshall–Heilbronn). In Neckarsulm, there is a four-minute connection to the shortened Regionalbahn services to Stuttgart, which also reach Heilbronn Hbf faster because they do not pass through the city centre. However, this transfer is often criticised as not working because of delays, especially in the afternoon.

=== Freight ===
Freight trains are mostly scheduled in the early mornings and the late evenings. These are mostly complete trains, consisting of wagons carrying cars or coal or of tank cars, operated by DB Schenker Rail Deutschland. But private transport companies also operate freight on the Neckar Valley Railway, for example, TX Logistik, Häfen und Güterverkehr Köln and BCB.
