= Elztal =

- Municipality
- Coat of arms

- Location of Elztal within Neckar-Odenwald-Kreis district
- Interactive map of Elztal
- Location within Germany Location within Baden-Württemberg
- Coordinates: 49°23′09″N 09°11′25″E
- Country: Germany
- State: Baden-Württemberg
- Admin. region: Karlsruhe
- District: Neckar-Odenwald-Kreis
- Subdivisions: 5

Government
  - Mayor (2020–28): Marco Eckl

Area
  - Total: 46.63 km^{2} (18.00 sq mi)
- Elevation: 198 m (650 ft)

Population (2025-12-31)
  - Total: 5,800
  - Density: 120/km^{2} (320/sq mi)
- Time zone: UTC+01:00 (CET)
  - Summer (DST): UTC+02:00 (CEST)
- Postal codes: 74834
- Dialling codes: 06261, 06293, 06267
- Vehicle registration: MOS, BCH
- Website: www.elztal.de

Elztal is a municipality in the Neckar-Odenwald district, in Baden-Württemberg, Germany. It is named after the valley of the river Elz.

== Geography ==
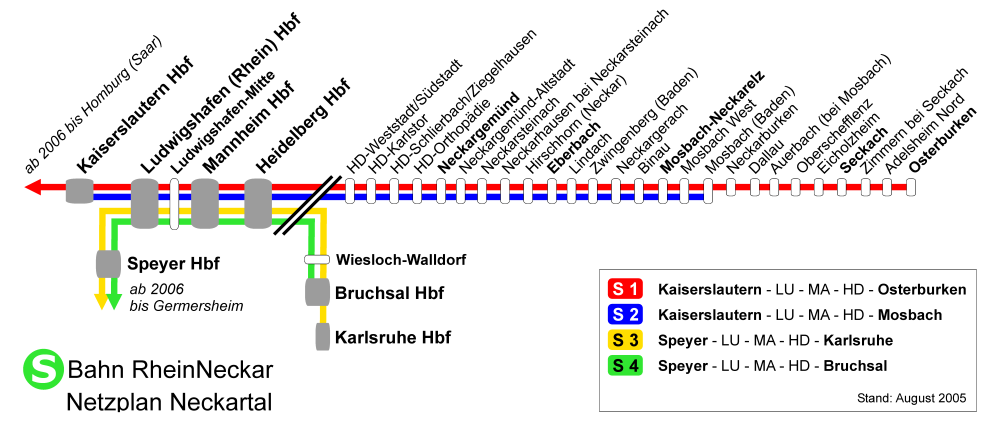
Subnet plan of the S-Bahn RheinNeckar

The municipality Elztal is located in the southern part of the Odenwald, close to Mosbach at the B 27, B 292 and L 615. The next district cities are Heilbronn in the South and Heidelberg in the North. The local river Elz or sometimes called Elzbach is flowing through Rittersbach, Dallau and Neckarburken and ends at Neckarelz into the Neckar river. The highest point of Elztal is located in Dallau at the Urnberg. At the moment there's a part of a former NATO base (Nike-Stellung D 1/67; later: A 3/71); today a cattle farm (Cattle-Horse-Ranch). The former living complex in the valley was demolished in 2007.

== Municipality structure ==
The municipality contains the five districts of Auerbach, Dallau, Muckental, Neckarburken and Ritterbach. The combined population amounted to 6100.

Auerbach district (Au) => Auerbach bei Mosbach, Dännigsiedlung
Dallau district (Dal) => Dallau, Mariental
Muckental district (Muc) => Muckental, Gehöft Rineck
Neckarburken district (Nbu) => Neckarburken
Rittersbach district (Ri) => Rittersbach, Heidersbacher Mühle, Zinken-Hütte

In all five districts are local governments in the sense of the Baden-Württembergs municipality order (Gemeindeordnung), each with its own town council (Ortschaftsrat) and mayor (Ortsvorsteher) as its chairman.

From 1788 to 1850 there was an older village between Dallau and Muckental with the name Rineck. Today the only certificate and remaining of this time is the Rineck far. Since 1850 the Rineck farm is known for its strawberry plantation.

=== Coats of arms ===
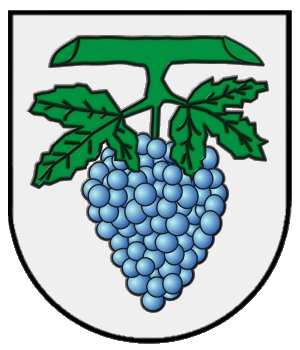
Auerbach bei Mosbach

Dallau

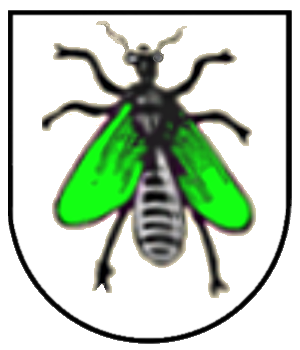
Muckental

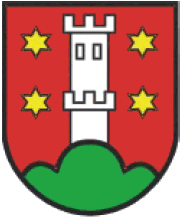
Neckarburken

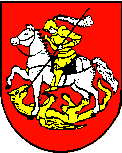
Rittersbach

The crest of Dallau and the municipality of Elztal contains on a white or silver background Saint Michael with blue wings. In his right hand he raises a golden sword and in his lefts he holds a Libra to illustrate the balance of good and evil. Bottom right, there's an oval escutcheon/shield with the Teutonic Cross on a white background on the right side. On the left side there's the Palatinate-Wittelsbach rhombus flag of the Free State of Bavaria (Freistaat Bayern). Saint Michael was the former patron of the former catholic Monastery on the Urnberg in Dallau.

The Auerbach crest symbolizes the former status of Auerbach as wine region. Muckental and Neckarburken's crest are symbolizing only their toponyms. The Rittersbach's crest shows their patron Saint George (hl. Georg) in a battle with a dragon.

== History ==
=== Colonization ===
The current area of the Elztal was populated by Germanic peoples in its prehistoric time. Today there are 14 burial mounds which witnesses it. The emergence of this burial mounds are dated on the middle of the 1st Millennium BC. At the time of the Romans ran the limes through the Elz Village. The limes was strengthened from the Romans with a fort (today known as: Fort of Neckarburken). The Germanic settlers in Elztal were shocked from this changes and relied into the security of the forests and woods of their home area. In addition, the Romans strengthened their fort with nearby inns (Villa rustica) and a separated Vicus (camp village) for its military troops. The Romans in the Elztal were eliminated in 260 AD by the Alemannic Germans. In 497 AD, the Franken conquered the territorium and founded the villages Aue amnis (Auerbach), Dallau, Neckar Castellum (Neckarburken) and Miles Militis Flumen (Rittersbach). On the occasion of foundations of Frankish noblemen to the monastery Lorsch are the first written references of the four settlements in the Franconian Lorsch Codex (Lorscher Codex). In this Codex, the villages are named:

Dallau (772 AD) => Dalaheim (Talheim)
Neckarburken (774 AD) => Borocheim (Burgheim)
Rittersbach (783 AD) => Rodinsburon (Ruodis Bure)
Auerbach (791 AD) => Urbach

In the 9th century AD, the villages has connections to the catholic Cyriak Monastery (Cyriaksstift) in Worms-Neuhausen and the Diocese of Worms which enlarged it influence after a gift of Emperor Otto II. So the Diocese of Worms possessed the Mosbach Abbey with possession in 23 cities and villages.

=== Middle Ages ===
In the Middle Ages divided the society in different classes. In these time ascents some of the Elztal peoples into the 1st society class. One of them was Herr von Heinriet (1336 AD) who owned the Festivals of Dallau and a lot of land. After any years the Herr von Heinriet impoverished and developed to robber barons. In the extermination campaign 1356 AD of the Mainzer Archbishop Gerlach von Nassau against Albrecht Schenk von Limpurg in Lohrbach was the water castle (Wasserschloß) of Dallau in order of Karl IV conquered. In this campaign Dallau was devastated and its settlers and peoples murdered by the order from Karl IV. Gerlach von Nassau got the rights to reestablishment of a new city on the Dallau territory. But he never realized this right. After the Death of Gerlach in 1371 AD, the Herr von Heinriets owned now the Possessions of the Elztal villages again. These were sold to Cunz Münch von Rosenberg in 1380 AD. During this sale was Muckental in its first time mentioned. In the 14th and early 15th century was the Elztal owned by Herren von Weinsberg, Herren von Hirschhorn and Albrecht Schenk von Limpurg. The Rineck Farm between Dallau and Muckental got 1726 AD a bad reputation and was now known as an infertile farm territory. In the Lohrbach it got nicknames like Wild Plants (lauther Wildnus), Bad Odenwald Field (schlecht Odenwäldisch Feld) and Desert Territory (Wüsteney). The farm included an area of 200 Morgen for sheep grazing. The Royal Palatinate hereditary of Mannheim prompted the reclamation of the barren land of the Rineck Farm. Fifty years later, the territory of the farm was issued to settle. The settlers received some own land and had to submit their natural produces and yields to the Lohrbach basement office. The old farm was now renamed in Altrineck. New nicknames were Althof and Rühlingerhof. The settlement of Rineck was 1784 AD renamed into Neurineck. The settlers of this new settlement consisted of tinkers, Broom binders, basket makers, itinerant entertainers, musicians and mole catchers. A number of them were deported from their former municipalities; they were known as Rielinger. The first mayor of the municipality was Franz Holzschuh (29 August 1788).

=== Leiningen and Baden ===
Through contributions and accommodation in the time of the French Wars and the losing of the left-side-territories of the Rhine, the Elz Valley villages are hard burdened. So the nobles led a political realignment for southwestern territories within the Holy Roman Empire (Heiliges Römisches Reich Deutscher Nation). In this way the Elz Valley villages were 1803 AD incorporated into the Principality of Leiningen. In 1806 the Principality dissolved and was now a part of Baden.

1803 confirmed the former reputation from the Rineck Farm. Infertile soil and negligent field orders caused a famine. Begging, thefts, poaching and armed raids were now on the agenda and shifted the whole area into fear and turmoil. All surrounding villages complained of the robberies and thefts at the courts. But nothing was done. Until 1838, the first complaint of the Mosbach supreme court reached the Baden District Government. In this, the settlers of the municipality New Rineck were accused of being thieves, crooks, arsonists and vagabonds because they refused to work. From the people there were already claims to urge the settlers of New Rineck to emigrate to the USA. After lengthy negotiations with the surrounding municipalities this demand was realized. The first transport with 168 involuntary emigrants left New Rineck on 3 October 1849. The second Group left New Rineck on 11 May 1850 with 200 emigrants and the third Group left the municipality on 13 May 1850 with a group of 235 emigrants. On 2 December 1850, the municipality New Rineck dissolved. Ferdinand Scipio acquired the land in 1856 and created a farm with an area of 500 Morgen. Currently is the Rineck Grange owned by the Baron of Gemmingen-Hornberg.

The road (today's B 27) through the Elz Valley were expanded in 1847 AD to improve the local market conditions. Another important project was the Railway Mosbach-Neckarelz to Osterburken which is today very frequented by students, travelers and not mobile persons.

But there were no big changes after the realizing the projects. So the villages was remained agriculturally.

=== World Wars and post-war years ===
Within the time of World War I, there were no changes and no happenings within the Elz Valley villages. The Second World War caused suffering and deaths in most of the settled families. A tombstone in the center of Dallau near to Volksbank and the water castle testify to the shocking happening of an inevitable war.

The first structural changes occurred during the last three war years and in the immediate postwar period of the transitional government. by the inclusion of refugees from the destroyed cities, the population of the villages rose. In the post-war years settled again a number of displaced from the eastern territories in the Elz Valley villages. New development zones and industrial estates have now been expelled and contributed to structural change.

It needed a long time to recover from the impacts of the recent World War. Every village of today's Elztal was a self-governed municipality within the Mosbach district of the North Baden county (Nordbaden).

The first sports facilities were built in the late 1960s:

1967: Sportzentrum Dallau (sports center)
1968: Elzbergstadion and Elzberghalle (Elzberg stadium and Elzberg gym)

As part of the district reform on 1 January 1973, Auerbach, Dallau, Muckental and Neckarburken founded the new municipality Elztal with Dallau as district office.

== Educational facilities ==
Auerbach, Rittersbach, Neckarburken and Dallau have their own primary schools called Grundschule. The secondary school (Hauptschule) of Elztal is in Dallau behind the official municipality town hall (Rathaus). The secondary school in the Elztal (Hauptschule mit Werkrealschule; translated: secondary school with modern secondary handicraft workshop) is coupled with a handicraft workshop to learn the practical part in manual work (compulsory), technology (compulsory; election in the last year because compulsory), art (compulsory), home economics (election in the last year) and cooking (compulsory; election in the last year because compulsory). This is incidentally not a standard on German secondary schools.

Within the municipality are three evangelical and two Catholic nursery schools called Kindergarten.

== Important firms ==
=== Muckental ===
August Mackmull GmbH (builders)

=== Rittersbach ===
OWR (manufacturer of decontamination equipment)

=== Auerbach bei Mosbach ===
Elzal Service Schneider (Schneider Coach Travel)
Strauss Erika Einzelhandel (toy store)

=== Dallau ===
Blechnerei Mack (Tinsmiths Mack)
Finkenrath (former firm; famous as a tax fraudster)
Glaserei Kaufmann (Glazier Kaufmann)
Spitzer Silo-Fahrzeugwerke GmbH (Europeans largest silo vehicles manufacturer)

== Sights and special features ==
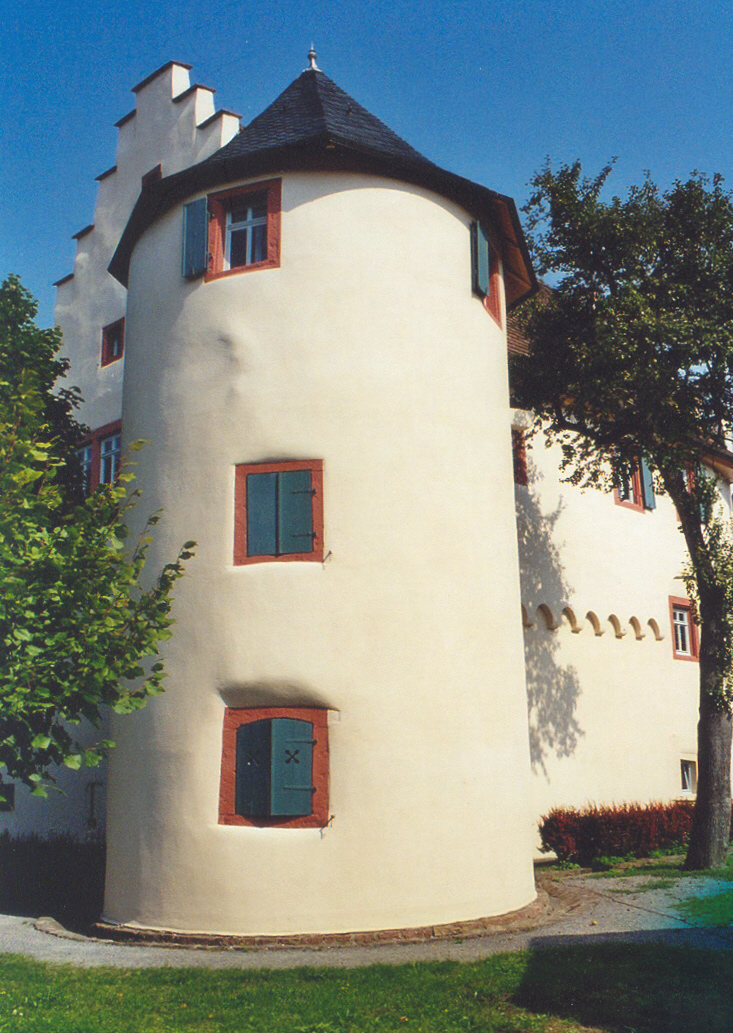
The water castle in Dallau

=== The water castle of Elztal ===
The water castle of Dallau was bought up by the municipality Elztal in 1974 AD. It is the only remnant of a former and much larger water castle. The water castle was built in the earlier 12th century AD from knights of the Teutonic Order. Particularly striking are the circular tower and the palace room with a medieval staircase gable. The both fountains near the water castle were built in the 16th century by farmers. At Christmas time, it is possible to go inside the water castle for the annual flu issue of the municipality.

=== Religious institutions ===
In Dallau the evangelical and the Catholic church are side by side. The churches are surrounded by other historical buildings as for example the catholic parish office and the Protestant schoolhouse.

The Protestant church was built in 1750 AD and expanded 1857 AD.

The Catholic Church St. Maria Immaculate was consecrated on 9 May 1737. In 1985, the transverse building was complemented and the old choir renewed. Because the historic stained glass window in the old building had no Marie reference, the new parts were built with a baroque statue of Marie and other Marie symbols. The re-consecration of the church was held on 10 May 1987.

In Neckarburken , the local church (built 1775) with its church tower (built 1811) and the surrounded half-timbered houses a beautiful a historic ensemble. Opposite is the former rectory which was built in 1818. In addition, you will find one of the very rare historical bread-back positions (from 1809) and a historic lime kiln, which was restored in 2006.

In Auerbach are a Protestant church which was renewed 1789, a Catholic church and several historic half-timbered buildings. These include the historic Gasthaus Lamm, the old railway station (today a S-Bahn station) and the old schoolhouse.

In 1886 the new George Church designed by Ludwig Maier replaced the former one. The predecessor was built in the 14th century AD and was made of wood. The newer one is in the New Romanized Style from Ludwig Maier consists mainly of sandstones from the surrounding mountains. In the case of a renovation 1969/1970 AD inside the church were simplified the frescoes simplified. Another renovation held in 2002.

On the Hill of Urns there was a monastery in medieval times. Certificates for this are easy to find. So there are multiple remains in the Große Kappel and in the Kleine Kappel. More of the wall remains are inside the Nature Reserve between the Urnbergstraße and the underlying track.

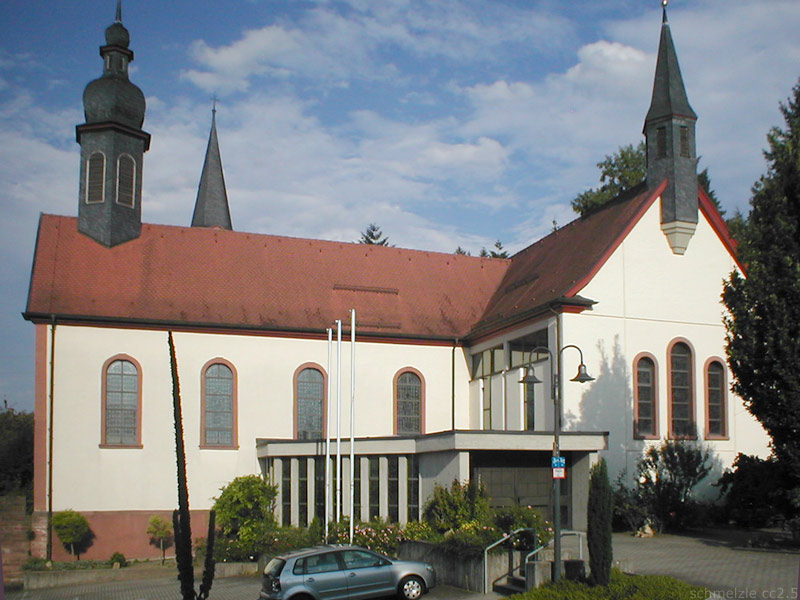
St. Maria Immaculata in Dallau

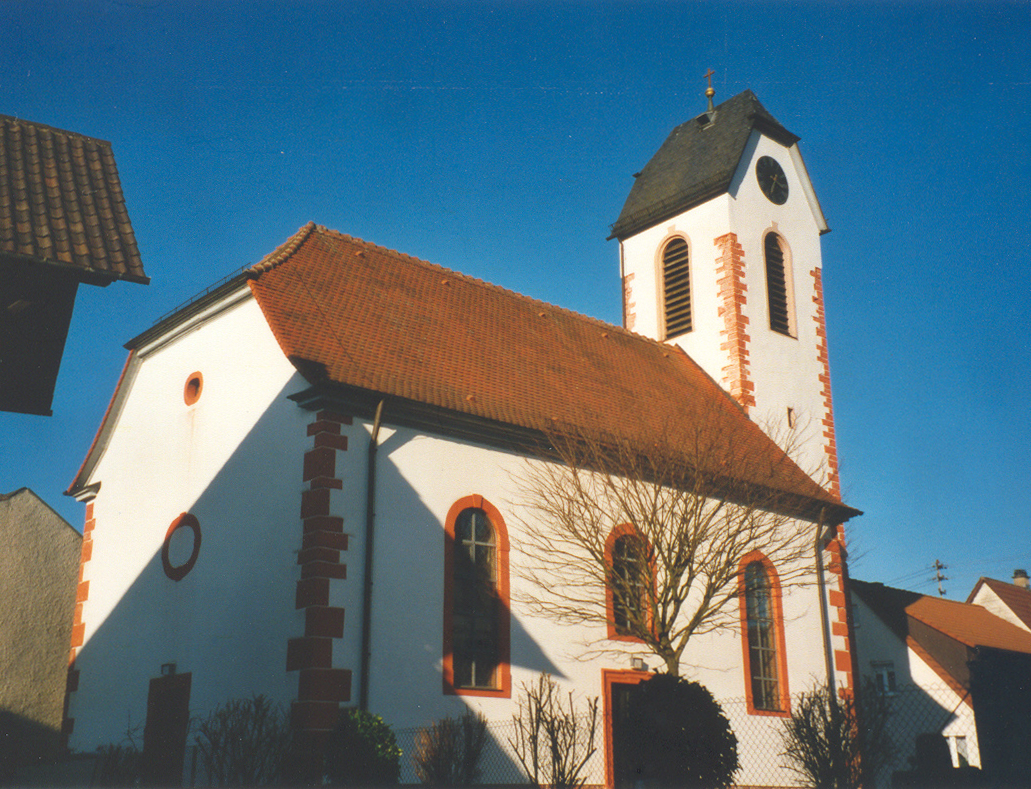
Protestant church of Neckarburken

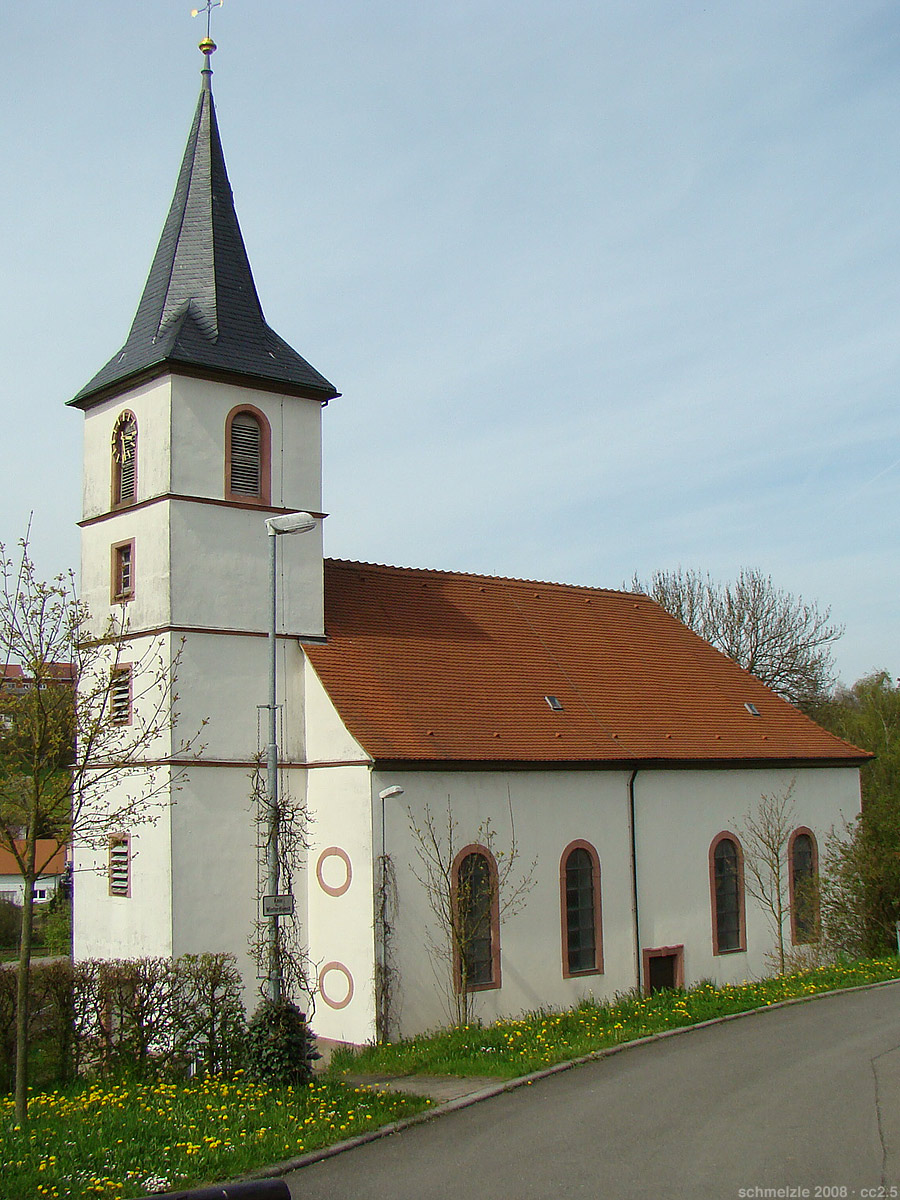
Protestant church of Auerbach

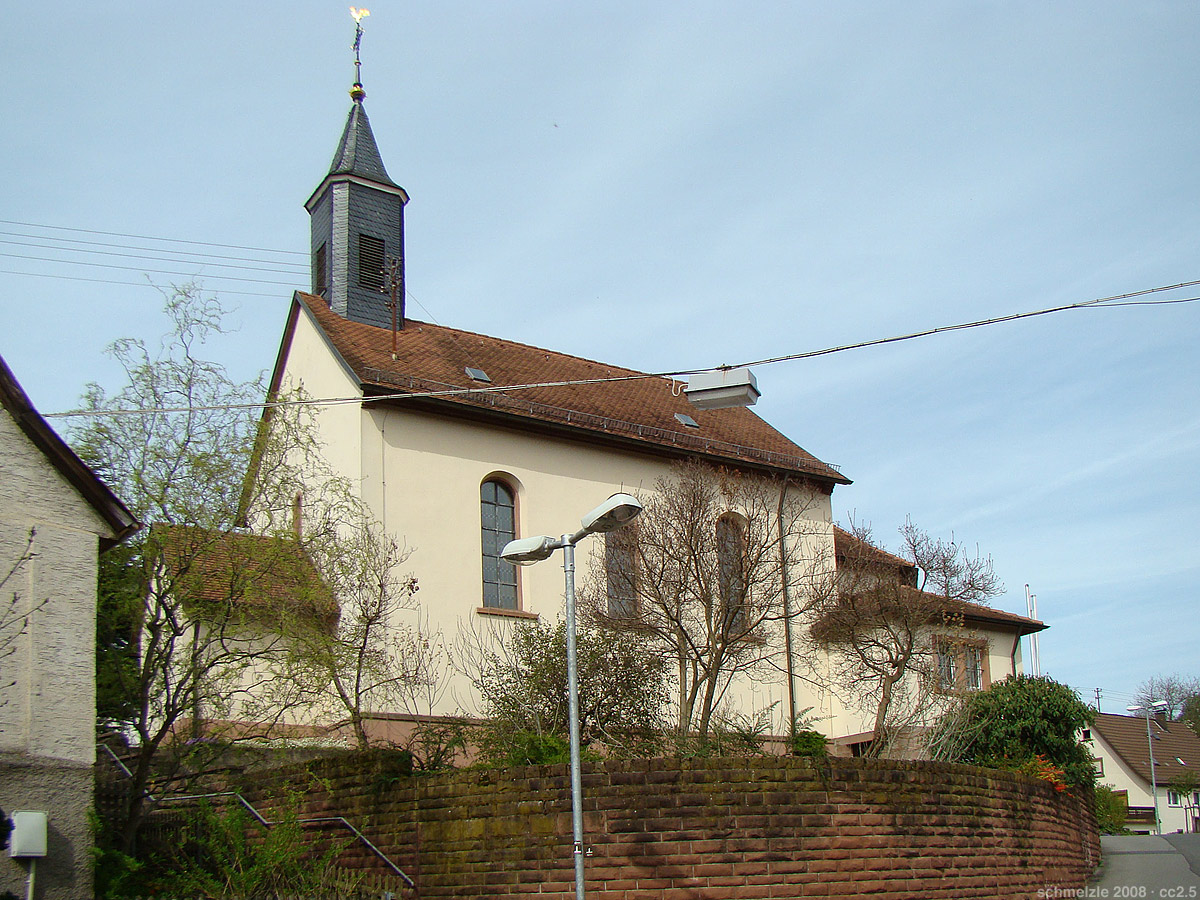
Catholic church of Auerbach

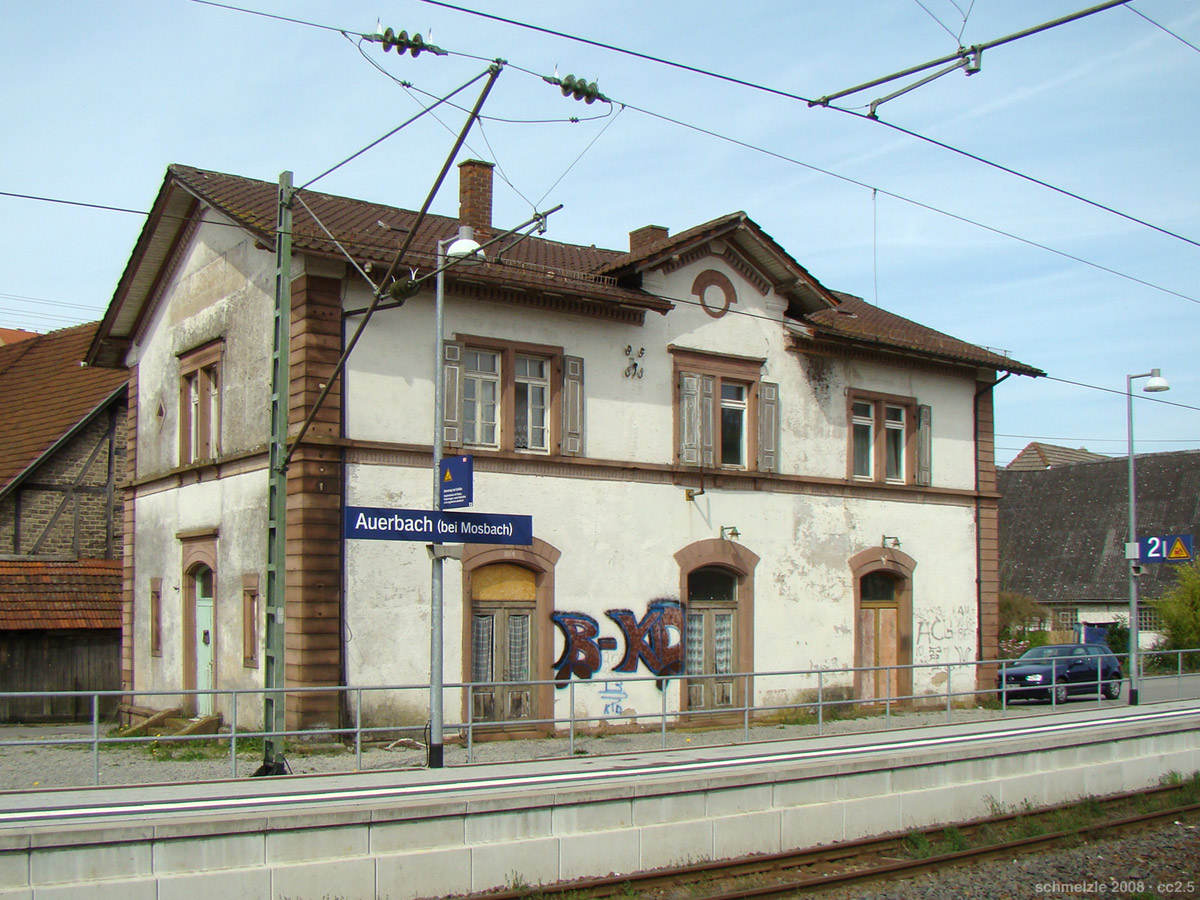
Old railway station of Auerbach

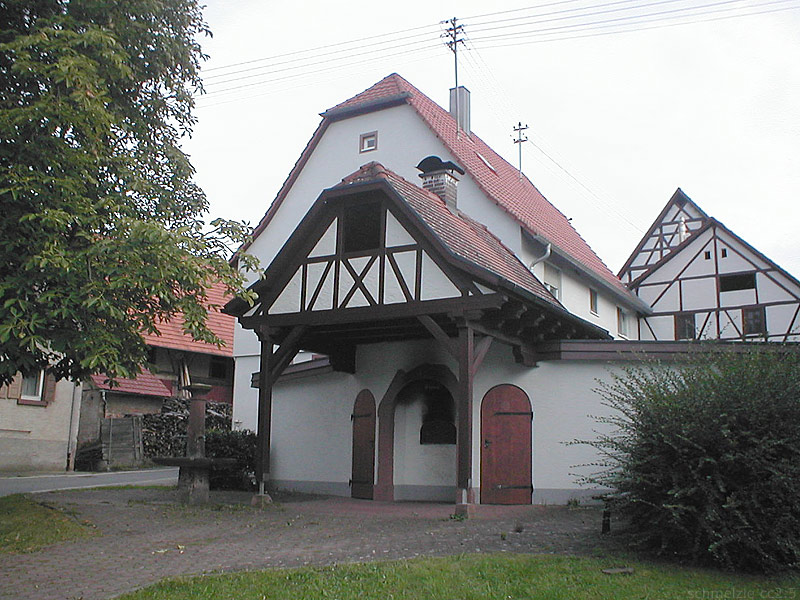
Historical bread-back positions of Neckarburken

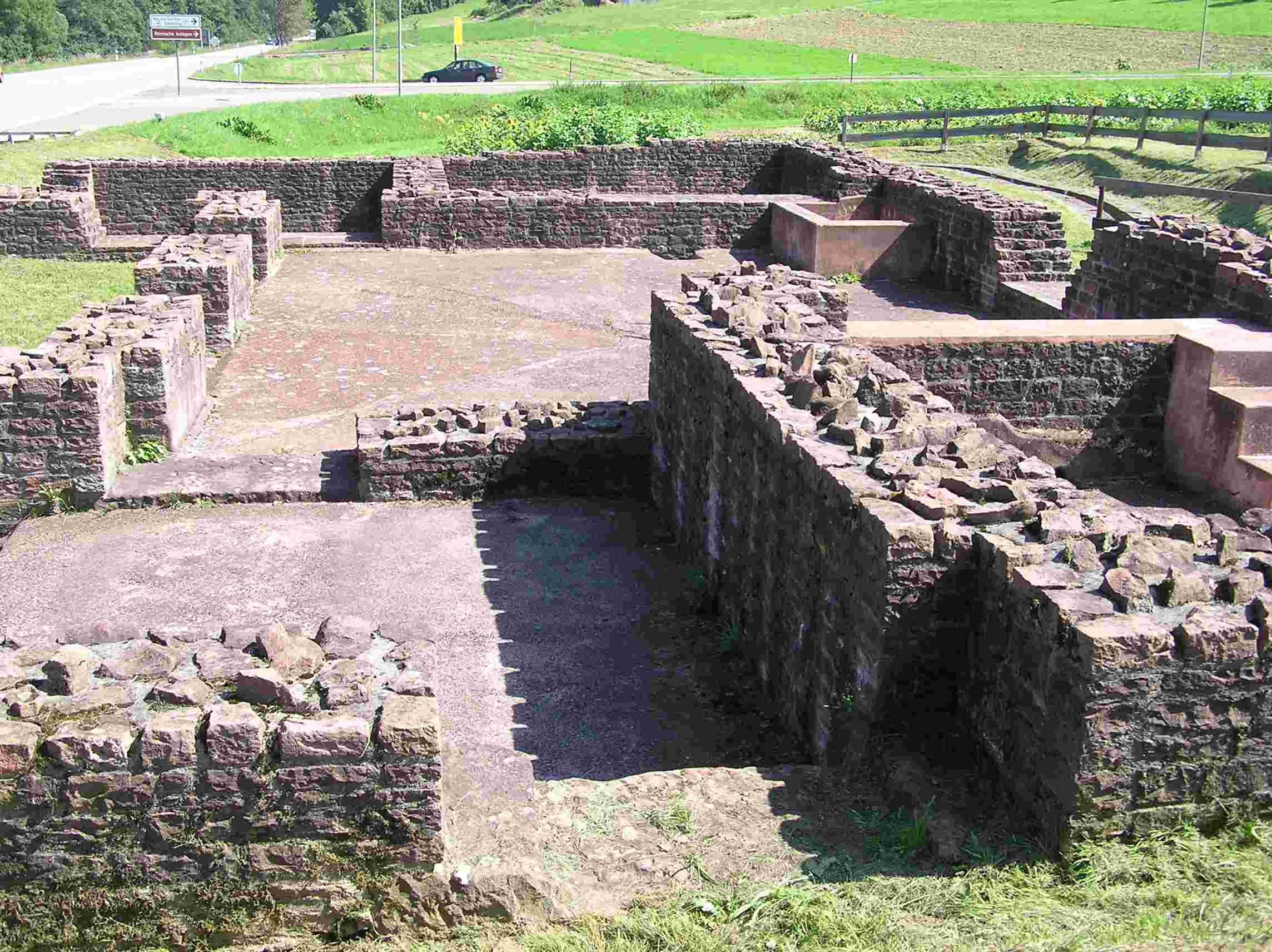
Foundation of a Roman bath house

=== The Limes ===
Another historical place is the Fort of Neckarburken and the Elantia Museum (Museum Elantia / Museum am Odenwaldlimes).

=== Walking and hiking ===
The municipality Elztal offers a number of routes for walking and to rest. One favorite route is the small circuit in Dallau. It is especially nice in spring and summer. Parking is available at Krähenwaldparkplatz near to the Märchenwald.

On the circuit there are multiple branchings and inconspicuous forest paths. The first peculiarity on the circuit is a hidden tulip tree on the right side of the way. A few hundred meters along is a three-compartment crossing on the left side. The first way is only a path and leads to the oldest tree of the municipality. The second leads to an old and small chapel which is on a brook and a little bridge over it. On the other side one has the choice to go inside the Mariental on the left or the rest of the circuit on the right. From the main road you will reach a Y-crossing. So you have the choice to go to the right or to the left, but as it is circular you can go either way.

One can then walk through Mariental. There are multiple rare grasses, plants and bird species. In this valley can be seen the power of a volcano. One can find multiple hurled magma lumps coming from the Katzenbuckel.

Other popular routes for walking are the hiking:

- Dallau – Auerbach
  - Forest street parallel to B292 and then around the Cattle-Horse-Ranch (former Nike-Stellung / Missile defense base) along the streets
  - Valley route passing the shelter and the Cattle-Horse-Ranch (former Nike-Stellung / Missile defense base)
- Dallau to Lower Schfflenz
  - Valley route passing the shelter and the Cattle-Horse-Ranch (former Nike-Stellung / Missile defense base) and then passing the barbecue place

For biking there is the old Roman road between the Elz Valley and the Schefflenz Valley recommended. One can start in Mosbach and end in Walldürn. Those preferring valley routes can use the signposted standard route from Mosbach through the Elz Valley up to Walldürn or Osterburken.

== Municipal elections ==
=== 2004 ===
CDU	41,8%	+ 3,0	9 Sitze	± 0
FWV	32,9%	– 1,1	7 Sitze	± 0
SPD	17,2%	– 5,0	3 Sitze	– 2
GAL	8,0%	+ 3,0	1 Sitz	± 0

=== 2009 ===
CDU	43,1%	+ 1,3	9 Sitze	± 0
FWG	30,3%	– 2,6	6 Sitze	– 1
SPD	17,9%	+ 0,7	3 Sitze	± 0
GAL	8,7%	+ 0,7	1 Sitz	± 0
