= Rineck =

Former Settlement in Elztal, Baden-Württemberg, Germany

Coordinates: 49.435709°N 9.198765°E

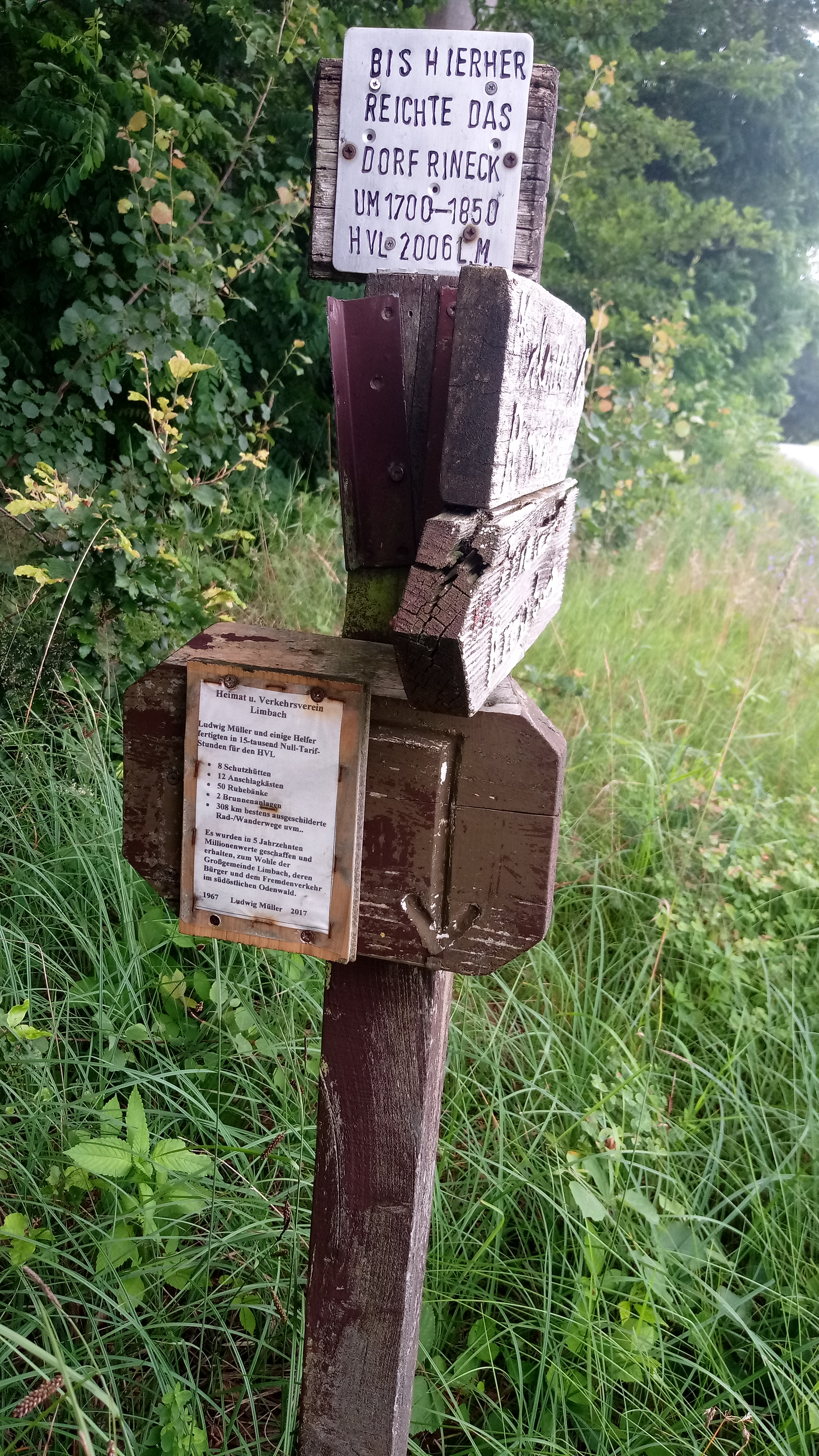
This metal plate on a signpost marks the northern end of Rineck

Rineck is an estate in the present-day municipality of Elztal in northern Baden-Württemberg. From 1788 to 1850, it was the community of Rineck, but it was dissolved due to the unfavorable reputation of its inhabitants, who were forcibly removed and mostly deported to America. Today, a farm is co-located on the estate with a seminar and health center, the German Center for Prana Healing.

== Geography ==
The Rineck Estate sits approximately one kilometer north of Elztal-Muckental in the southern part of the Odenwald mountains.

== History ==
=== Barren Pastureland ===
The area between the Odenwald villages of Krumbach, Limbach, Muckental and Trienz belonged to the Electoral Palatinate in the early 18th century and was administered by the Cameral Office in Lohrbach. This barren and infertile stretch of land near Rineck was described by the Lohrbach Cameral Administrator in 1726 as pure wilderness and bad Odenwald field, and in 1727 as deserty. Only one farm, the Rineckshof, had been located there for a long time, otherwise the area of about 200 acres served as sheep pasture for the surrounding communities.

=== Settlement from 1784 ===
As early as 1733, the Electoral Palatinate Court Chamber in Mannheim prompted the Mosbach Chief Office to examine the possibility of reclaiming the barren land. About 50 years later, the area was finally put out to tender for settlement by the Lohrbach Cameral Office Minet. The settlers each received about one acre of land as a gift and had to commit themselves to pay produce and interest to the Lohrbach Cameral Office. The nearby farm was then called Altrineck, Althof or Rühlingerhof, while the settlement that developed from 1784 onwards initially bore the name Neurineck.

Some of the settlers were farmers from the surrounding Odenwald communities, but some were also from the traveling community. Among the occupations mentioned are: kettle patchers, broom makers, basket makers, jugglers, mole catchers, traveling musicians, and dog traders. The inhabitants did not always come voluntarily, but were also sometimes deported from their former communities. They were popularly called Rielinger. The first mayor, Franz Holzschuh, received the bill of sale and the legal code from the Electoral Palatinate on August 29, 1788, which elevated the settlement of Rineck to a municipality. Rineck was aligned to the Principality of Leiningen in 1803 and to the Grand Duchy of Baden in 1806. Ecclesiastically, Rineck belonged to the parish in Rittersbach. Mayor Holzschuh came from the old Rineckshof and owned a total of 36 acres of land, making him the largest landowner in the community. Peter Edinger was the second-largest landowner with 19 acres, and Georg Nohe the third-largest with 12 acres. Both also came from the old Rineckshof.

=== Poor Living Conditions ===
Due to the poor soil and the careless cultivation of the fields of the village, whose population of 57 working people in 1803 only included seven farmers, there was often hunger, begging, theft and poaching. There are also reports of armed robberies by Rieling gangs. Since the community did not have its own forest, there was often wood theft in surrounding forests, committed by "armed gangs". Contemporary reports even speak of the fact that no wood at all was bought in Rineck anymore, but that all the wood needed was stolen elsewhere, and that the community of Rineck, referred to as the "Langfingerleshof" ("Pilferers' Farm"), aroused "the general complaint of the surrounding area" and was "demoralized to an unbelievable degree".

In April 1835, the mayor of Lohrbach and most of the men of the village were lured out of their village, under the pretext of a timber raid that had just taken place by Rineck residents, and the mayor's estate was set on fire. The district authority suspected that the perpetrators were in Rineck and stationed a gendarme there, but he was shot in the back while on duty at night in June 1836.

In 1838, the Mosbach chief bailiff complained to the district government that the inhabitants, who had gradually grown to a number of 600, were "thieves, crooks, arsonists, vagrants, etc., because they don't want to work". Since there was no money in the Rineck community treasury, the state took over the salaries of the mayor, teacher, doctor, coroner, gravedigger, etc., and more gendarmes were stationed in Rineck to put a stop to the criminal activities of the inhabitants.

Finally, demands were made to persuade the inhabitants of the community to emigrate to the USA. The Baden state conducted lengthy negotiations with the surrounding communities to persuade them to bear part of the costs or to accept residents unwilling to emigrate. In the end, however, the emigration of over 600 people was arranged, for which the Baden state raised 63,000 guilders.

=== Dissolution of the Municipality in 1849/50 ===
The first transport with 168 mostly single emigrants left Rineck on October 3, 1849. The emigration first took place by wagons to Eberbach, then by ships via Mannheim to Bremen or Antwerp and from there to New York, where the head of each family received 20 guilders, each additional person received 10 guilders, and they were then left to their fate. Over the winter, good news arrived from these emigrants, which made the impending emigration somewhat easier for those who remained behind.

In April 1850 there was a lively market in Rineck, as the remaining population had to sell their superfluous belongings and, as it were, acquire things needed for emigration. On May 11 and 13, 1850, most of the remaining Rineckers were finally transported out of the village in two groups of 200 and 235 people. The action was supervised by the Mosbach official staff and another 40 gendarmes. The wagons needed to transport people and belongings were requisitioned from neighboring villages and the people of the neighboring villages followed the events with great interest. These two transports also went to New York, where again 10 or 20 guilders were paid out and the people were left to their fate. The majority of the emigrated Rineckers settled in Philadelphia. The Baden Emigration Association was informed in 1851 that the Rineck mayor had settled with 80 community members in Rochester, New York, near Lake Ontario. They all lived together in one street, had plenty of earnings, and were well known because of their good conduct. These were the same people for whom there were not enough prisons in their homeland to punish them for their thefts and timber poaching.

About 20 to 25 residents could not be persuaded to emigrate. Four families were assigned to the community of Muckental, some unmarried persons came to Schwetzingen, and some old and infirm were distributed among the surrounding villages. On December 2, 1850, the community of Rineck was dissolved. After the dissolution of the community, the capital creditors received the mortgaged properties, which were then sold for demolition. Fields and gardens came by means of sale to residents of Krumbach and Old Rineck.

The community of Ferdinandsdorf, only about ten kilometers away, succumbed to a similar fate around the same time. Tolnayshof, a community with a similar social structure in the neighboring region of Bauland, managed to hold on until 1880.

=== Founding of the Present Estate ===
Some residents of Alt-Rineck also emigrated shortly thereafter at the encouragement of the Neu-Rineckers already in the United States. After that, Ferdinand Scipio's mother purchased large portions of the land in 1856, creating a 500-acre estate that Ferdinand built up with his brother-in-law Gustav Herth. After Ferdinand Scipio's death, his son Wilhelm Scipio (dec. 1953) continued to run the estate. During the hundred or so years of Scipio ownership, the estate was managed by stewards and was never profitable; rather, losses were made up from Scipio assets. Upon his death, Wilhelm Scipio's grand-nephew and secretary Eberhard von Gemmingen (b. 1926) inherited the estate. He had plans to increase profitability, but all the farm buildings were destroyed by fire in 1954. Reconstruction was completed in 1956, but repayment of the resulting debts dragged on until the 1980s. In 1989 the estate was extensively modernized.

Today, the Rineck Estate is used for seminars focusing on alternative healing methods and yoga, as well as for agriculture.

== Literature ==
- Leonhard Mezler: 1200 Jahre Lohrbach – 765 bis 1965, Gemeinde Lohrbach 1965
- Bruno König: 1200 Jahre Elztal, Elztal 1975
- Karl Wilhelm Beichert: Muckental und Rineck, 1995
- Prof. Dr. Eugen von Philippovich "Die staatlich unterstützte Auswanderung im Grossherzogtum Baden" in "Archiv für Soziale Gesetzgebung und Statistik – Vierteljahresschrift zur Erforschung der gesellschaftlichen Zustände der Länder" Fifth Volume, Publisher: Dr. Hch. Braun, Verlagsbuchandlung J. Guttentag, Berlin 1892
- Bruno König Für die ganze Umgebung geradezu unerträglich – Bericht des "Feldscherers Adam" von 1856 über die Gemeinde Rineck in Unser Land – Heimatkalender für Neckartal, Odenwald, Bauland und Kraichgau 2000, Pages 166 – 170 ISSN 0932-8173
- Karl-Heinz Neser Die "Diebskolonie" im Odenwald – Nach Scheitern des Erziehungsexperiments Auswanderung auf Staatskosten in Zeitschrift für die Geschichte des Oberrheins published by the Commission for Historical Regional Studies in Baden-Württemberg, W. Kohlhammer, Stuttgart, 1993 Volume 141 Pages 381–386 ISSN 0044-2607
- Karl-Heinz Neser Die Auswanderung der Einwohner von Rineck in Unser Land – Heimatkalender für Neckartal, Odenwald, Bauland und Kraichgau 2001 – Pages 65–68 ISSN 0932-8173
- Karl Wilhelm Beichert Die Kulturlandschaft Odenwald in der Vergangenheit in Badische Heimat – Zeitschrift für Landes- und Volkskunde, Natur-, Umwelt- und Denkmalschutz, 99th Vintage, Book 3, September 2019, Pages 391–402, in particular page 393, ISSN 0930-7001
- In 1937 Irma von Drygalski published her novel Rineck – Traum und Fluch der Landfahrer with Carl Schünemann in Bremen on the theme of Rineck's history. In addition to files on emigration, Ms. von Drygalski used oral histories from the region to create her plot.
