= Mosbach (Baden) station =

Railway station in Mosbach, Germany

Mosbach (Baden)
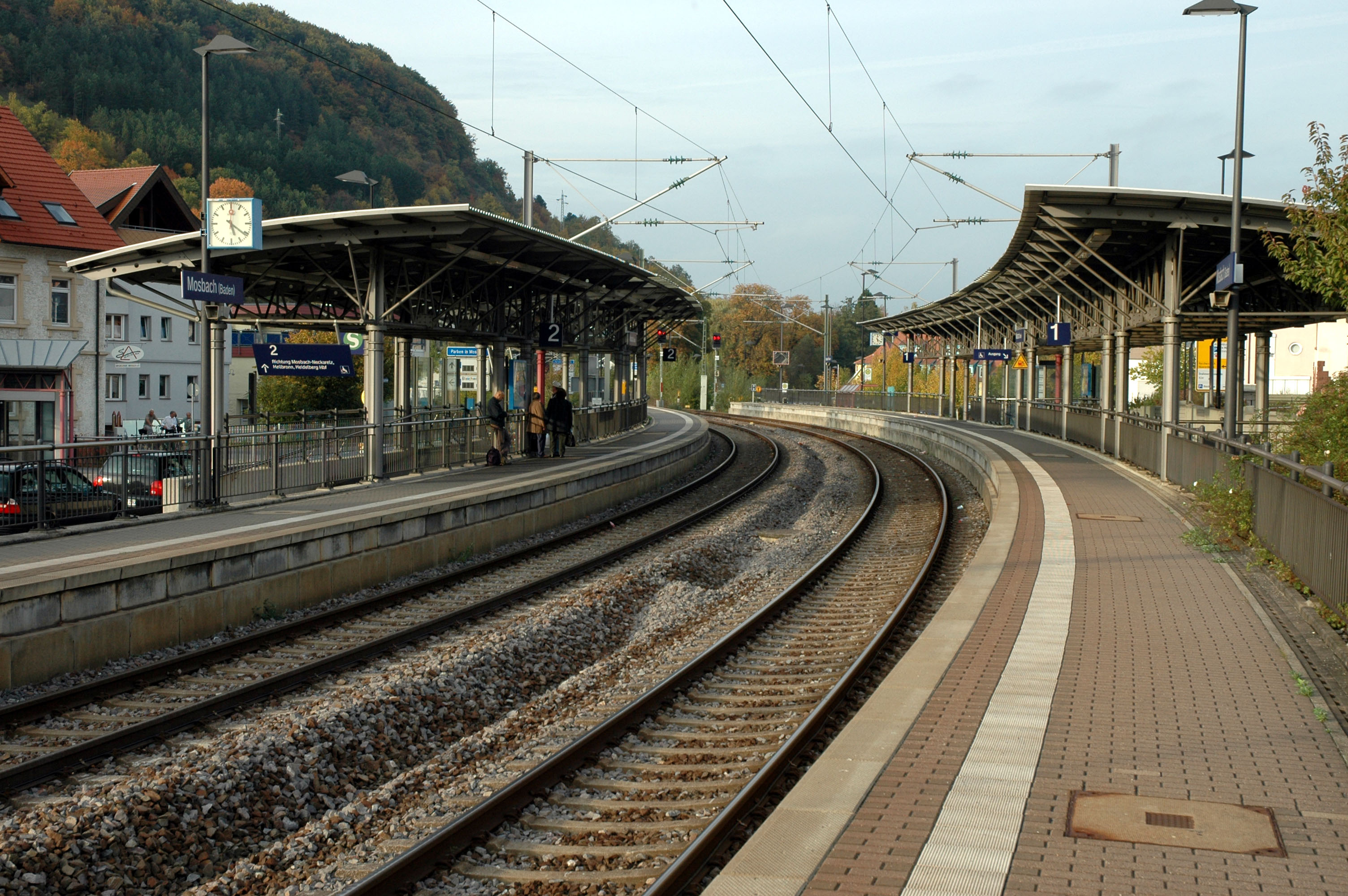
- Mosbach (Baden) station (Oct. 2007)

General information
- Location: Eisenbahnstraße 2, Osterburken, Baden-Württemberg; Germany
- Coordinates: 49°21′08″N 9°08′37″E
- Owner: Deutsche Bahn
- Operator: DB Station&Service
- Line: Neckarelz–Osterburken (km 53.4)
- Platforms: 2

Construction
- Accessible: Yes

Other information
- Station code: 4183
- DS100 code: RMO
- IBNR: 8004094
- Category: 6
- Fare zone: VRN: 267 and 268; HNV: 412 (VRN transitional tariff)
- Website: www.bahnhof.de

History
- Opened: 24 March 1997

Services
| Preceding station | Rhine-Neckar S-Bahn | Following station |
|---|---|---|
| Mosbach West towards Homburg (Saar) Hbf | S1 | Neckarburken towards Osterburken |
| Mosbach West towards Kaiserslautern Hbf | S2 | Terminus |
| Preceding station | Heilbronn Stadtbahn | Following station |
| Mosbach West towards Heilbronn Hbf | S 41 | Terminus |
Location

Mosbach (Baden) station is, along with Mosbach-Neckarelz and Mosbach West, one of three stations in the Baden town of Mosbach in the district of Neckar-Odenwald-Kreis. It is located at kilometre 53.4 of the Neckarelz–Osterburken railway. It was opened for the Landesgartenschau (state garden show) of 1997 as a replacement for the old Mosbach station close to Mosbach's old town.

== History ==
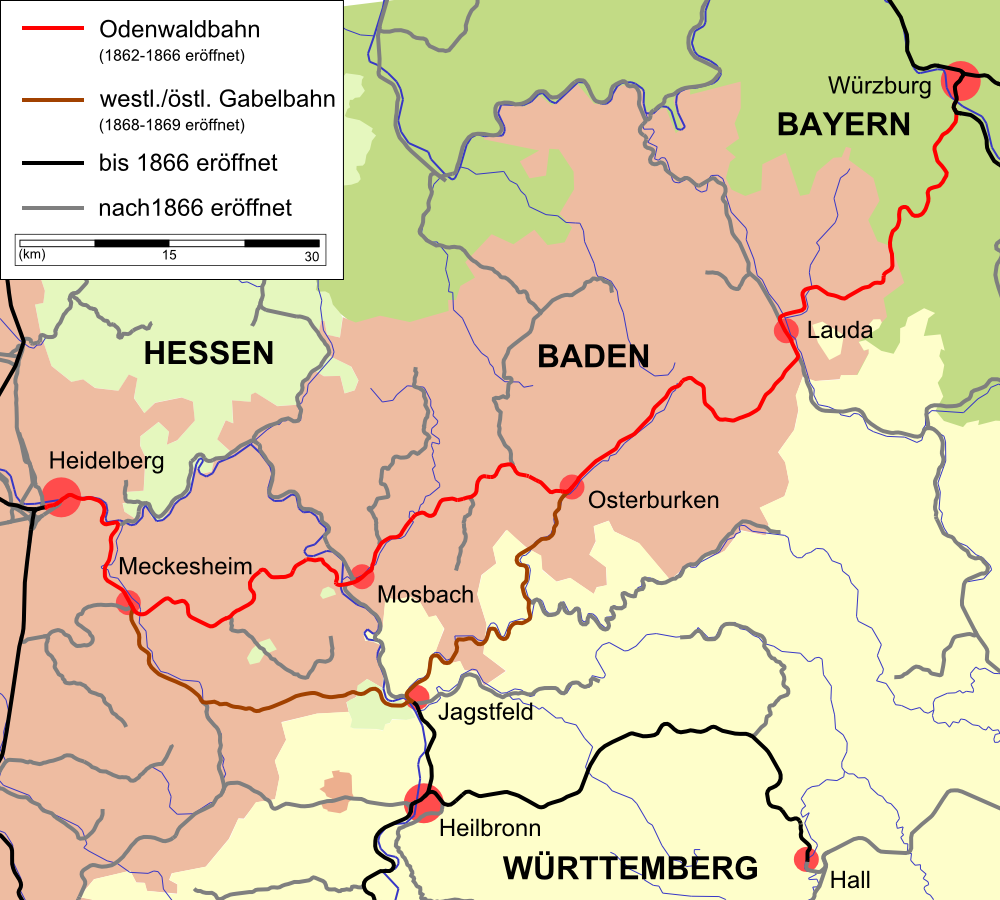
Route of the Baden Odenwald Railway

In the 1990s, the nature of the line changed fundamentally with the establishment of the Rhine-Neckar S-Bahn. A preliminary step was the construction of a new Mosbach station. The old station had been unsatisfactory for a long time. The station was some distance from the inner city and a level crossing at the station often caused congestion on the B 27. After disagreements between the city of Mosbach and Deutsche Bahn over the transfer of the site of the old station for the upgrading of the B 27, an agreement was reached in 1994 over the use of unused infrastructure. The new station, which is about 300 m north of the old station, was opened on 24 March 1997 at the same time as the horticultural show, which was about 100 m away. Its bidirectional platforms are accessible via ramps. The length of platforms allows use by trains with a maximum length of five cars. The platform height of 76 cm allowed for the operation of the S-Bahn's electric multiple units from the beginning. The costs of the construction of the station and relocation of the surrounding streets, amounting to 53.1 million Deutsche Marks, were shared between Deutsche Bahn and the town of Mosbach.

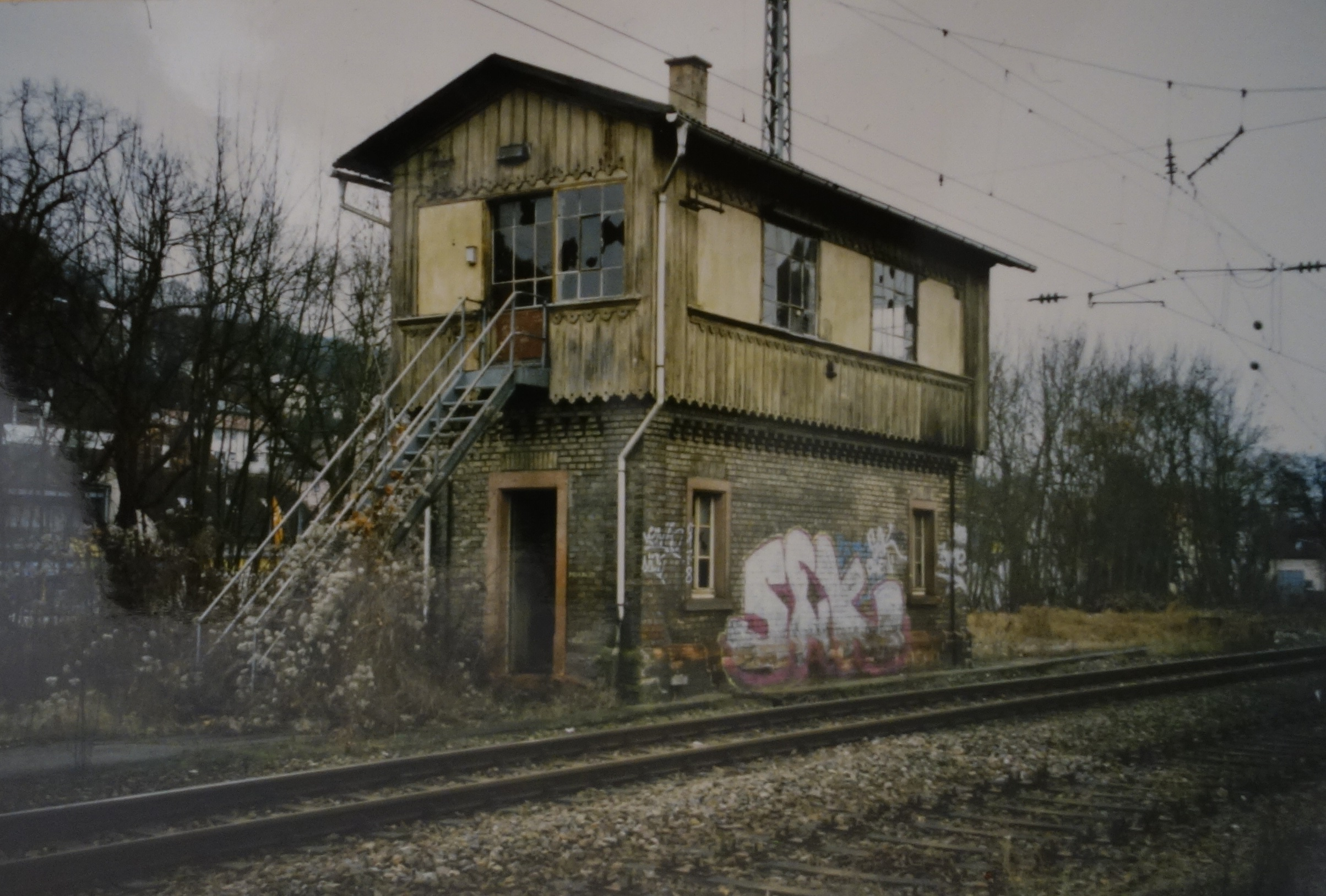
Old signalling control in 2001, shortly before demolition. Today the Bundesstraße 27 runs along here

The old station was subsequently closed and demolished in 2002.

At the timetable change 2003/2004 in December 2003, lines S1 and S2 of the Rhine-Neckar S-Bahn were officially opened.

== Rail services ==
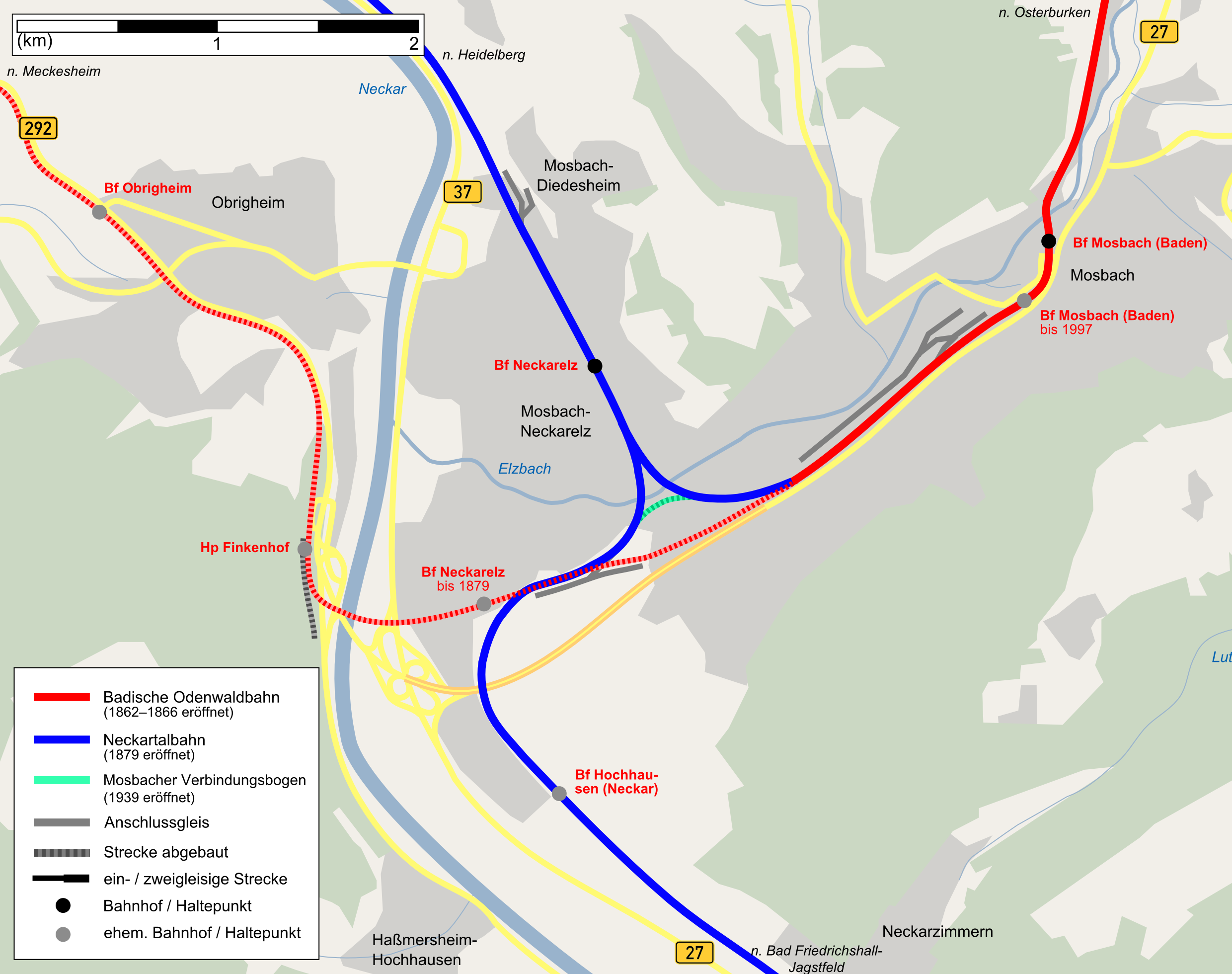
Development of the rail network in and around Mosbach

Mosbach (Baden) station is located at kilometer 53.4 of the Neckarelz–Osterburken railway and is served by S-Bahn trains operated by the Rhine-Neckar S-Bahn (line S1: Osterburken–Heidelberg–Mannheim–Homburg (Saar) and line S2: Mosbach (Baden)–Heidelberg–Mannheim–Kaiserslautern). Both services run hourly. Since they both use the same route between Kaiserslautern and Mosbach, they jointly provide a service every 30 minutes on this route.

Line S41 of the Heilbronn Stadtbahn also begins or ends in Mosbach, running hourly; it complements lines S1 and S2 between Mosbach (Baden) and Mosbach-Neckarelz.
