= Neckarelz =

- Stadtteil of Mosbach
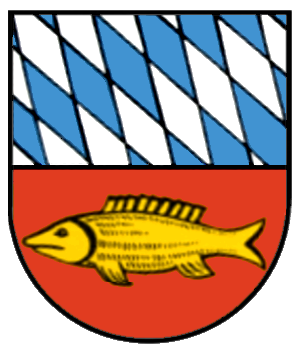
- Coat of arms
- Interactive map of Neckarelz
- Location within Germany Location within Baden-Württemberg
- Coordinates: 49°20′21″N 09°06′29″E
- Country: Germany
- State: Baden-Württemberg
- Admin. region: Karlsruhe
- District: Neckar-Odenwald-Kreis
- Town: Mosbach
- Elevation: 148 m (486 ft)

Population
  - Total: 6,500
- Time zone: UTC+01:00 (CET)
  - Summer (DST): UTC+02:00 (CEST)
- Postal codes: 74821
- Dialling codes: 06261
- Vehicle registration: MOS

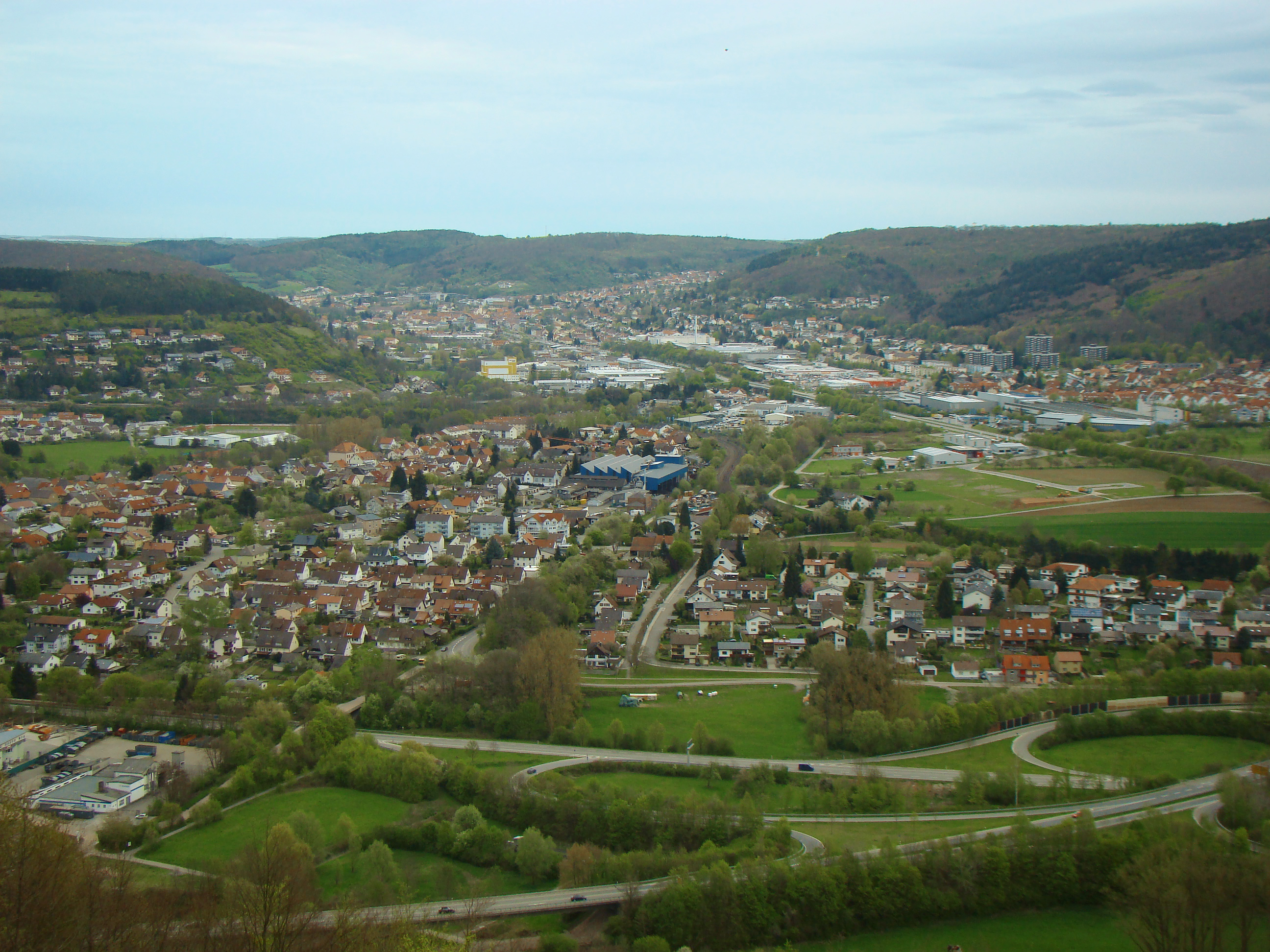
Neckarelz (front) and Mosbach (back) in the river Elz valley

Neckarelz is a suburb of Mosbach in Baden-Württemberg, Germany.

== Geography ==
Neckarelz is in northern Baden-Württemberg, between the Odenwald and Kraichgau, at the confluence of the Neckar and Elz rivers. On the other side of the Neckar, are the towns of Hochhausen and Obrigheim. Next to Neckarelz, is the suburb of Diedesheim.

== History ==
The town was part of the Electorate of the Palatinate from around 1362.

== Religion ==
Until World War II, Neckarelz was almost completely Protestant. After the arrival of Catholic refugees, a new church was built.

== Demographics ==
Neckarelz is the largest suburb of Mosbach, with approximately 6,500 inhabitants.

== Coat of arms ==
This depicts the rhombuses of the Electorate of the Palatinate at the top and a fish below.

== Education ==
Neckarelz has several kindergartens, a primary school (named after Clemens Brentano), and a grammar and Hauptschule, (both named after Auguste Pattberg).

== Transport ==
Neckarelz has a train station, connecting to the Neckar Valley Railway and the line to Osterburken, and a harbour.

== Buildings ==
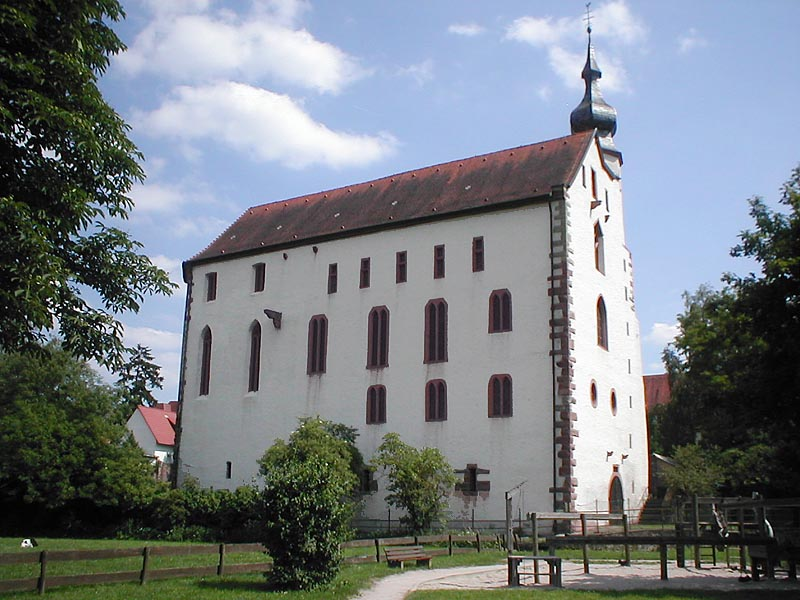
Tempelhaus - old castle of the Knights Hospitaller (12th/13th century)

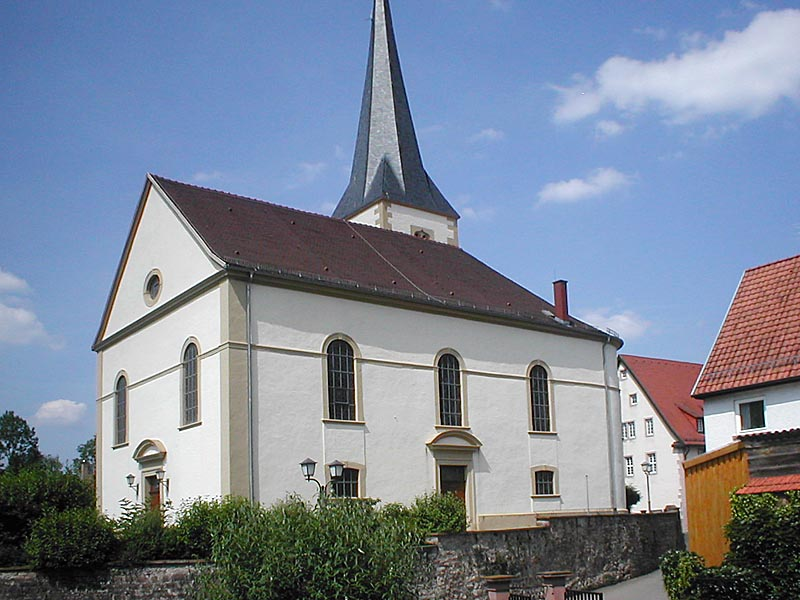
Protestant church

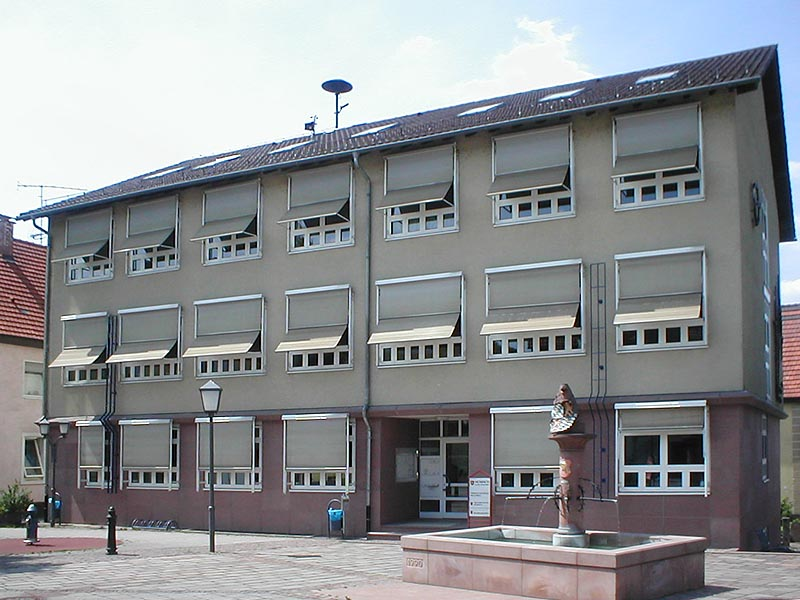
Verwaltungsstelle - "subsidiary" of the town hall of Mosbach

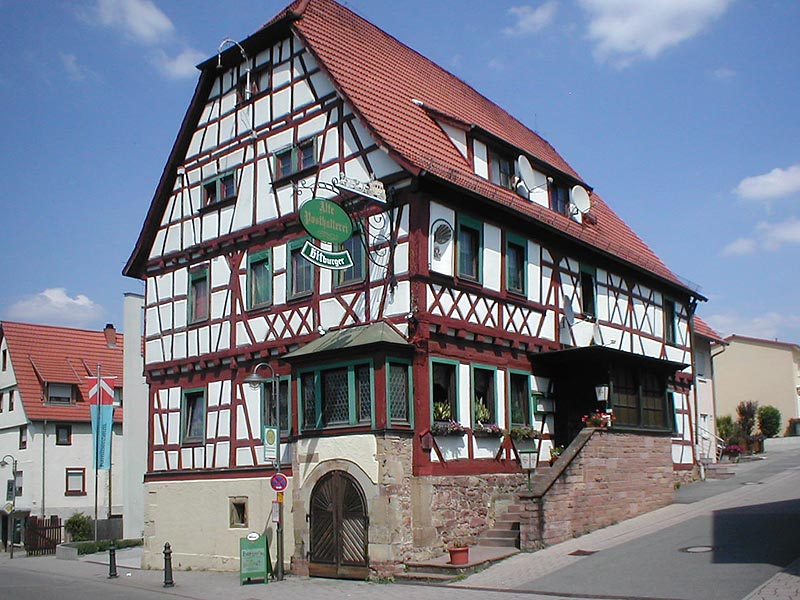
Example for a timber framing in Neckarelz: the "Alte Posthalterei"
