= Elz (Neckar) =

River in Germany

Elsenz
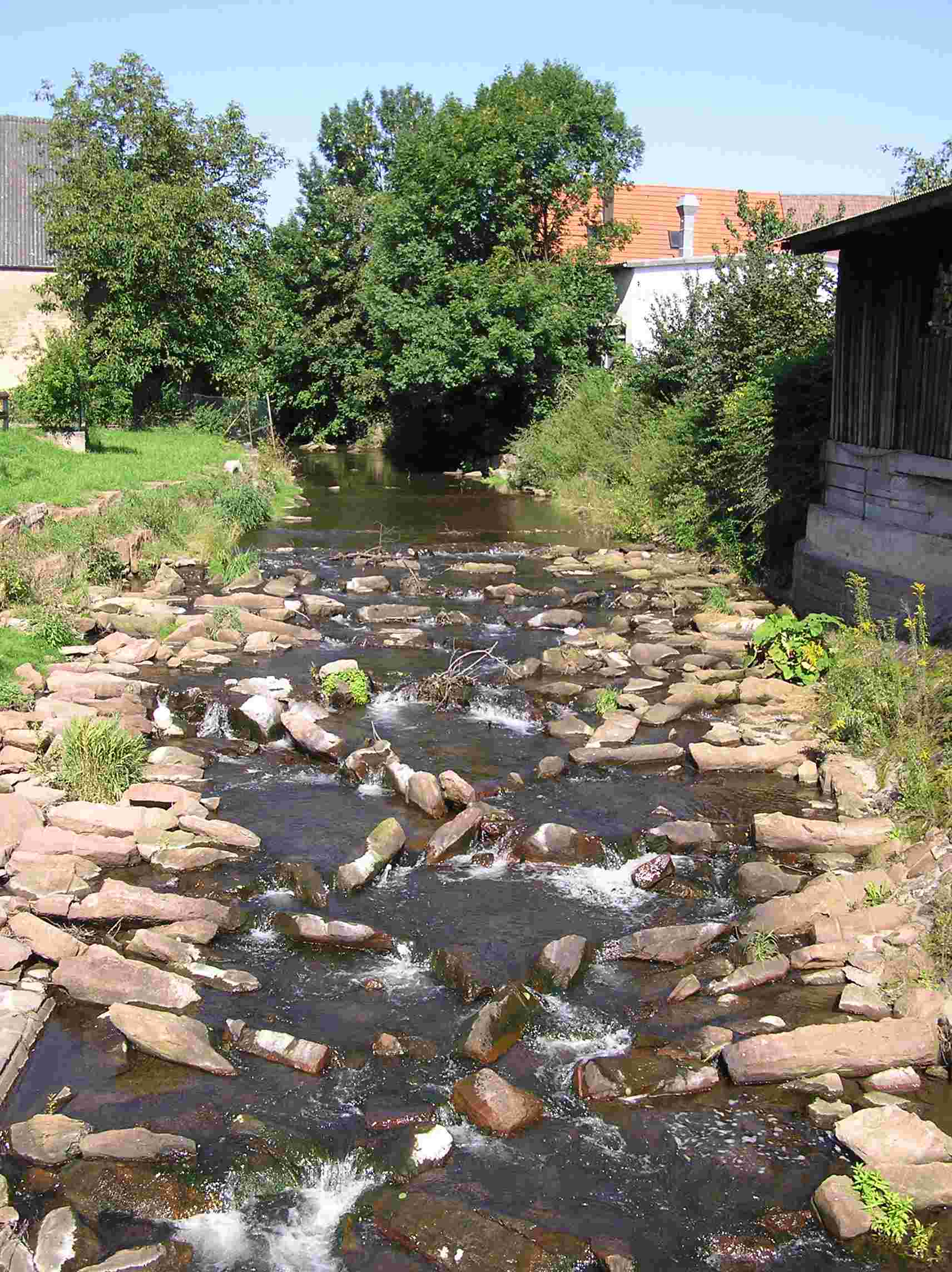

Location
- Country: Germany
- State: Baden-Württemberg

Physical characteristics
- Mouth
  - location: Neckar
  - coordinates: 49.3457°N 9.1006°E
- Length: 39.7 km (24.7 mi)
- Basin size: 160 km^{2} (62 sq mi)

Basin features
- Progression: Neckar→ Rhine→ North Sea

The Elz (German: [ˈɛlts]) is a small river in Baden-Württemberg, Germany, a right tributary of the Neckar. It rises in the Odenwald. The Elz flows through Mudau, Limbach and Mosbach before reaching the Neckar in Neckarelz, a borough of Mosbach. Its length is 40 kilometres.

== Tributaries and Lakes ==
(River length according to LUBW online map)

- Eisengraben, left tributary, 2.4 km
- Wasserrausch, left tributary, 2.3 km
- Steinigsbächlein, left tributary, meets the Elz in (Mittel-)Langenelz, 0.9 km
- Seeschlagbächlein, left tributary, 1.3 km
- Einbach, left tributary, 2.6 km
- unnamed creek, right tributary, 2.5 km
- Landgraben, left tributary, 5.4 km
- unnamed creek, right tributary, 2.4 km
- Guckenbach, left tributary, meets the Elz in Rittersbach, 4.7 km
- Muckbach, right tributary, 3.8 km
- unnamed creek, right tributary, 1.4 km
- Auerbach, left tributary, 5.7 km
- unnamed creek, right tributary, 0.7 km
- Luttenbach, left tributary, 2.4 km
- Danterquellgraben, left tributary,
- Trienzbach, right tributary, 19.1 km
- unnamed creek, left tributary, 0.6 km
- Klingengraben, right tributary, 2.8 km
- Hasbach, right tributary, 3.6 km
- Wolfsgraben, right tributary, 1.7 km
- unnamed creek, left tributary,1.3 km
- unnamed creek, left tributary, 1.7 km
- unnamed creek, left tributary, 2.1 km
- Nüstenbach, right tributary, 5.2 km

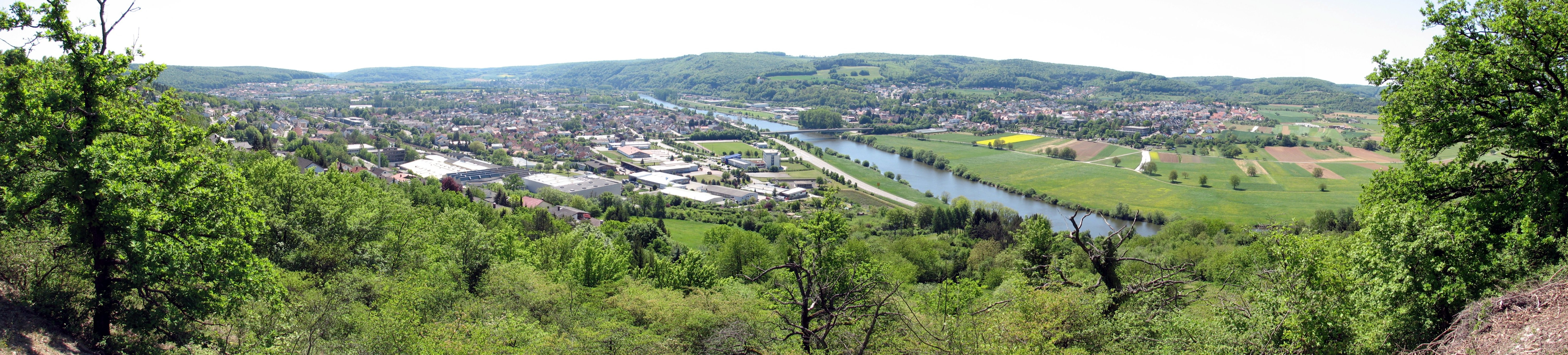
