= Osterburken =

- Town
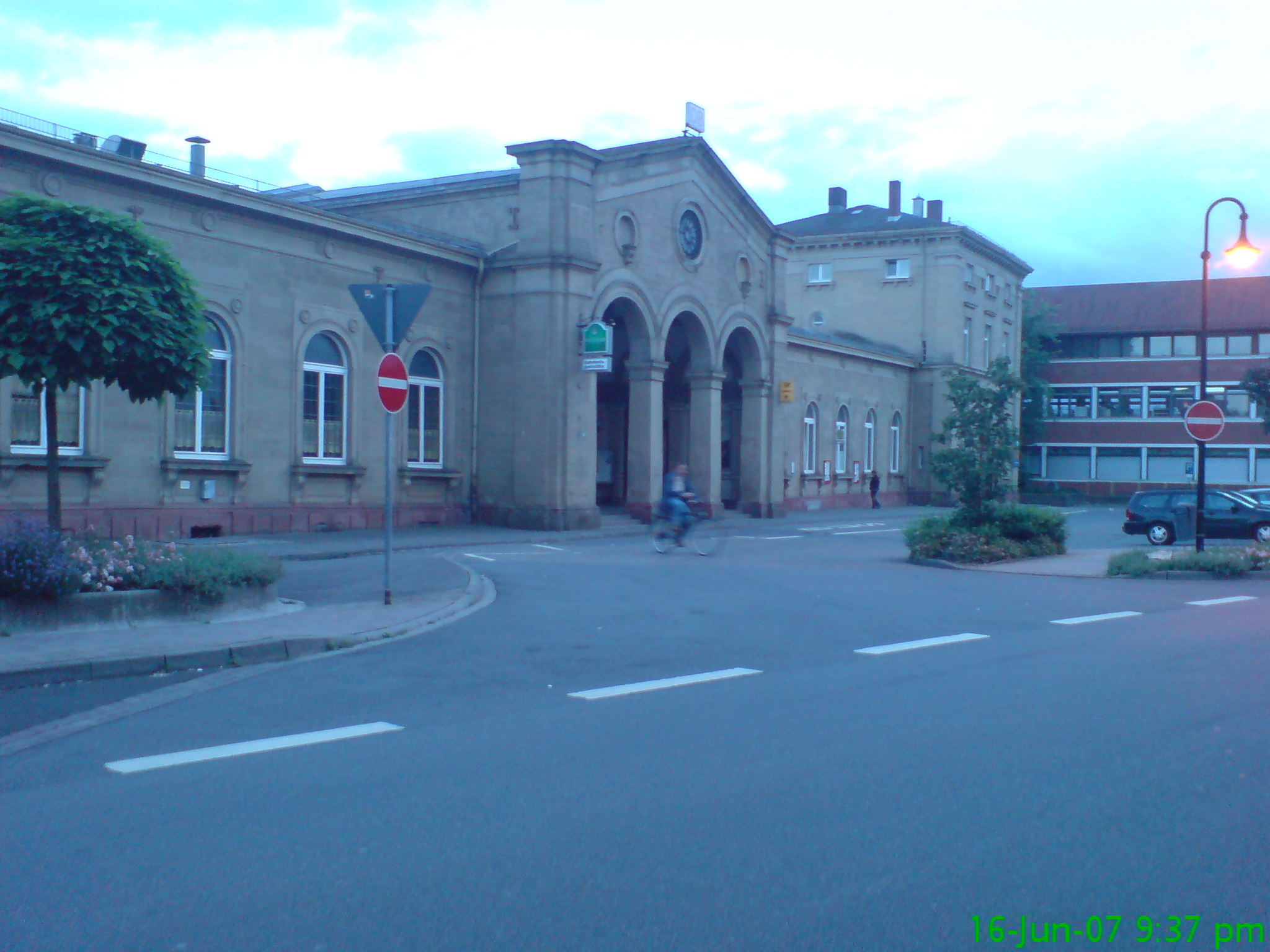
- Main train station

- Coat of arms

- Location of Osterburken within Neckar-Odenwald-Kreis district
- Interactive map of Osterburken
- Location within Germany Location within Baden-Württemberg
- Coordinates: 49°25′51″N 9°25′34″E
- Country: Germany
- State: Baden-Württemberg
- District: Neckar-Odenwald-Kreis
- Subdivisions: 4

Government
  - Mayor (2021–29): Jürgen Galm (CDU)

Area
  - Total: 47.32 km^{2} (18.27 sq mi)
- Elevation: 247 m (810 ft)

Population (2025-12-31)
  - Total: 6,572
  - Density: 138.9/km^{2} (359.7/sq mi)
- Time zone: UTC+01:00 (CET)
  - Summer (DST): UTC+02:00 (CEST)
- Postal codes: 74706
- Dialling codes: 06291, 06292, 06295
- Vehicle registration: MOS, BCH
- Website: www.osterburken.de

Osterburken (German pronunciation: [ˈoːstɐˌbʊʁkn̩]) is a town in the Neckar-Odenwald district, in Baden-Württemberg, Germany. It is situated 28 km southwest of Tauberbischofsheim, 50 km northeast of Heilbronn, 90 km east of Heidelberg, 60 km southwest of Würzburg and 30 km east of Mosbach. The S1 S-Bahn line of VRN public transport service operates between Homburg (Saarland) and Osterburken, hence the train station here is used frequently to transfer to and from other trains.
