= Bauland =

Gäu landscape in Baden-Württemberg, Germany

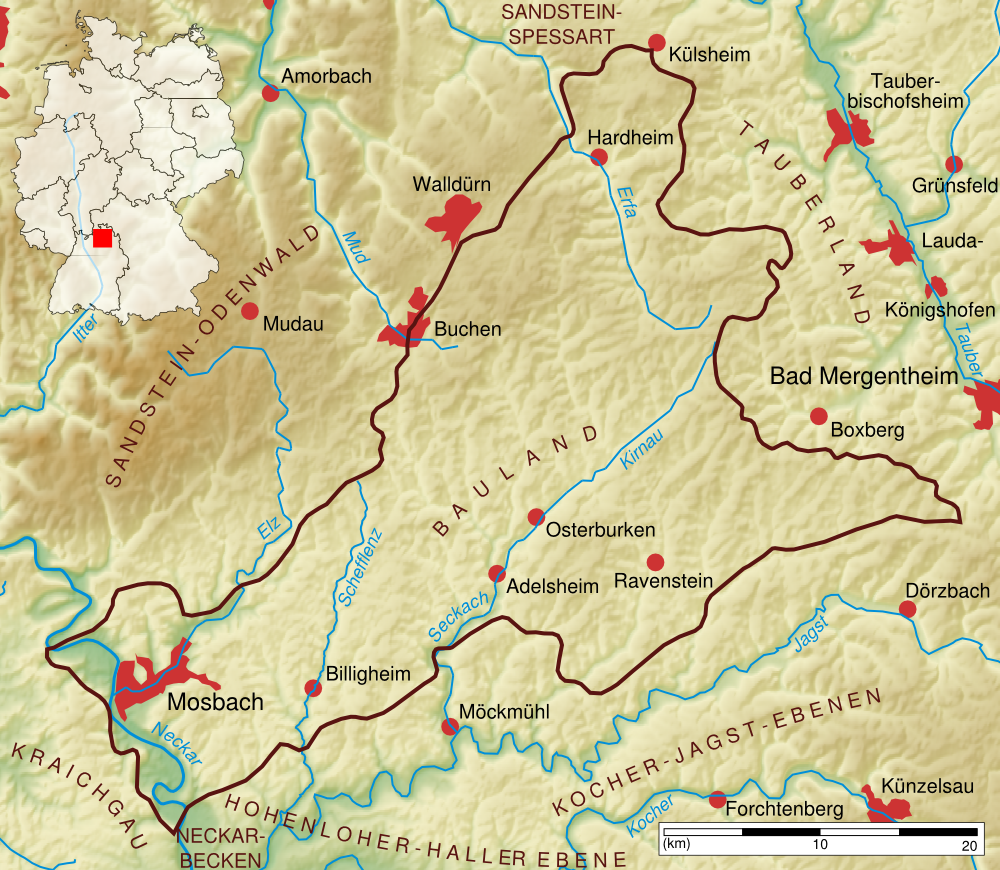
Physical map of the Bauland Natural region no. 128 (outlined in brown)

The Bauland (German pronunciation: [ˈbaʊlant]) is a Gäu landscape in the northeast of the German state of Baden-Württemberg. It is a natural region within the Neckar and Tauber Gäu Plateaus (major unit 12) in the South German Scarplands.

== Location ==
The Bauland is a Gäu landscape in the northeast of the German state of Baden-Württemberg. It is a natural region within the Neckar and Tauber Gäu Plateaus (major unit 12) in the South German Scarplands. It lies between the Odenwald forest and the Tauber, Jagst and Neckar rivers within the counties of Main-Tauber-Kreis and Neckar-Odenwald-Kreis. It also reaches into Hohenlohekreis and the county of Heilbronn. The Bauland is no. 128 in the classification system of the Handbook of Natural Region Divisions of Germany.

== Etymology ==
The name Bauland goes back to the word Ponland which meant a "strip of land in which beans are cultivated" (from the Middle High German pône). The Bauland is colloquially known as Baden Siberia (Badisch Sibirien) due to its climate. It is home to a form of spelt crop called Grünkern.

== Villages in the Bauland ==
- Adelsheim
- Ahorn
- Altheim
- Billigheim
- Buchen (Odenwald)
- Elztal
- Hardheim
- Höpfingen
- Külsheim
- Osterburken
- Ravenstein
- Rosenberg
- Schefflenz
- Seckach
- Walldürn

== Sights ==
- The over 600-metre-long Eberstadt Dripstone Cave (Eberstadter Tropfsteinhöhle) which is the accessible part of the Eberstadt Cave Worlds (Eberstadter Höhlenwelten)
- Doline fields as witnesses of the karst landscape
- Upper Germanic-Rhaetian Limes
- Adelsheim: Historic old town, Bauland Local History Museum
- Osterburken: Roman Museum, Roman castra

== Literature ==
- Meynen, Emil; Schmithüsen, Josef, eds. (1960). Handbuch der naturräumlichen Gliederung Deutschlands. Remagen, Bad Godesberg: Bundesanstalt für Landeskunde. Published in 9 issues in 8 books from 1953–1962, updated map at 1:1,000,000 scale with major units: 1960.
