= Dea Ecker =

Dea Ecker (born in Heidelberg, Germany) leads Ecker Architekten, an architecture and interior design practice based in Heidelberg and Buchen, Germany. Ecker's projects include the corporate headquarters for Holly Hunt, Ltd., in Chicago, the town halls in Seckach and Rosenberg, a community center in Zimmern, the Sparkasse (bank) in Hettingen, and the House Dandelion Clock, a kindergarten for physically and mentally handicapped children in Buchen.

== Biography ==
Ecker earned a Master of Architecture and Urban Planning from the College of Architecture at the Illinois Institute of Technology in 1996, and the degree of Diplom-Ingenieur from the Karlsruhe University of Applied Sciences in 1991. Ecker was a recipient of two consecutive Fulbright Scholarship grants that allowed her to pursue post-graduate work in the United States. Prior to founding Ecker Architekten with her partner Robert Piotrowski in 1998, Ecker worked in the Swiss-based bureau of Suter+Suter in Leipzig, and with Holabird & Root in Chicago.

== Awards, honors, publications, and positions ==
The work of Ecker has been exhibited at the Chicago Architectural Club, in a traveling exhibit of "Beispielhaftes Bauen" (exemplary buildings) from the Architectural Association of the state of Baden-Württemberg, Germany, and in a traveling exhibit of new inductees to the Bund Deutscher Architekten (Association of German Architects). Executed projects have been featured in publications such as Detail, Informationdienst Holz, Glas, [ark], and AIT (Germany), PUU – wood/holz/bois (Finland), Interni (Russia), and Interior Design Magazine in the United States. She has received high honors for her work, including the award of Beispielhaftes Bauen for the Community Center in Zimmern and the Kindergarten Dandelion House in 2007, and the honor of Gutes Bauten from the Bund Deutscher Architekten for the Town Hall in Seckach and the Community Center in Zimmern in 2008. Ecker was inducted into the Bund Deutscher Architeckten (BDA) in 2008, and Ecker Architekten was a nominee for the Hugo Häring Preis in 2009. She has served repeatedly as a juror of architectural competitions in Germany.

In 2010 Ecker received - in conjunction with the architecture students from the Illinois Institute of Technology, Chicago - an Honor Award for Distinguished Building from the Chicago Chapter of the AIA for the Field Chapel in Bödigheim, Germany. She frequently serves as a juror of architectural competitions on educational, administrative and religious buildings.

Ecker was a teaching assistant at the College of Architecture at the Illinois Institute of Technology during 1996–1997. She was a guest critic at IIT in 1999–2000 in Chicago, for the IIT Paris Program in 2008, and worked with students in an IIT design-build studio in the summer of 2009.

== Publications ==
- Ecker Architekten
- Detail- Konzept/Kindergartens - 03/2008
- Scala 2015 - 05/2008
- Interni - 08/2008
- ark - 10/2008
- Informationdienst Holz - 12/2008
- Interni - 01/2009
- Glas - 01/2009
- PUU- Wood/Holz/Bois - 01/2009
