= Hamam mahshi =

Egyptian dish featuring squab stuffed with grains

Hamam mahshi حمام محشي
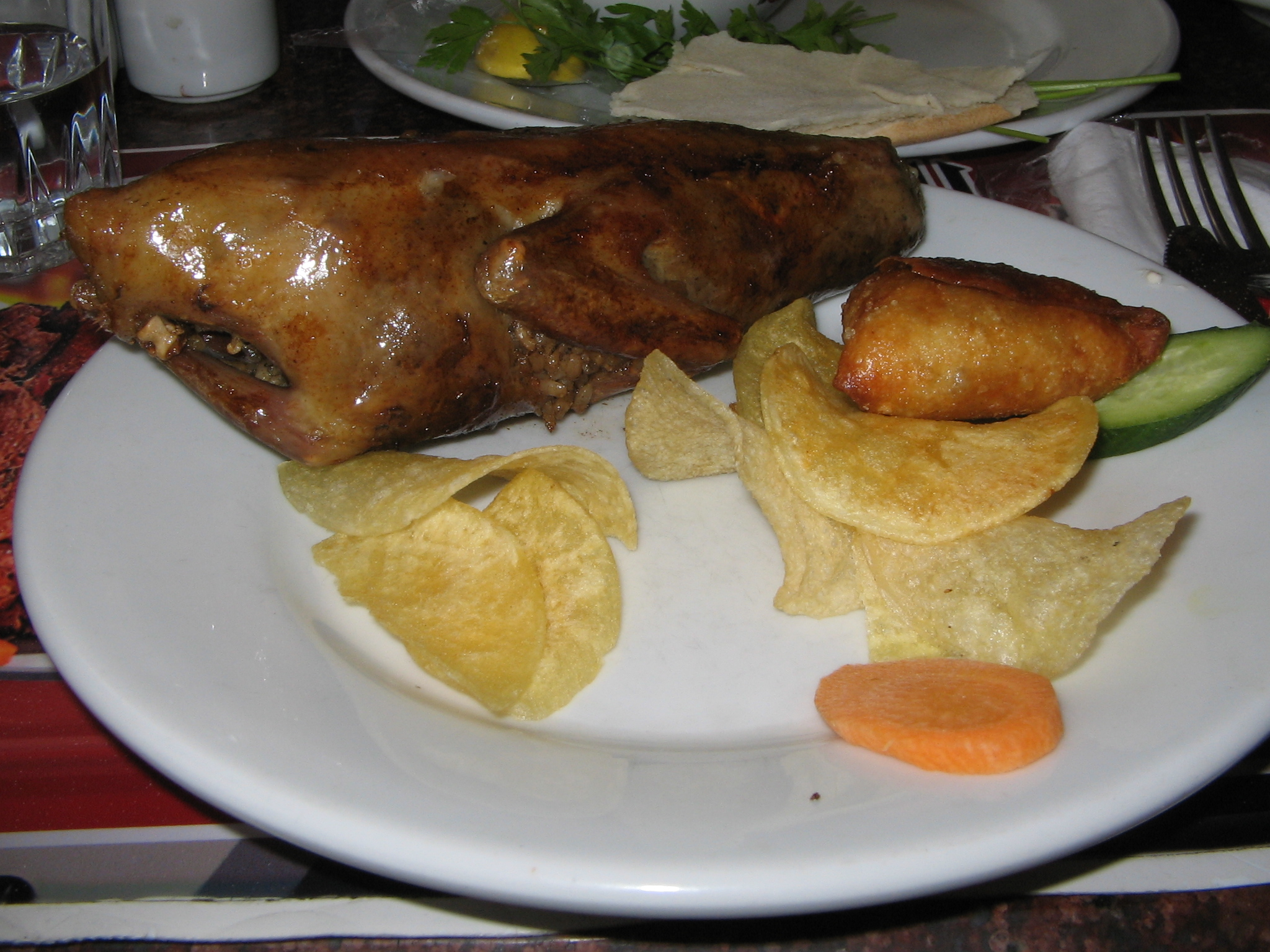
- Place of origin: Egypt
- Main ingredients: Squab, rice or freekeh, onion, cinnamon, and a blend of seasonings and aromatics.

Hamam mahshi (Arabic: حمام محشي) is a traditional Egyptian dish comprising pigeons stuffed with a seasoned mixture of grains, herbs, and spices. This delicacy has been a staple in Egyptian cuisine for centuries and is often associated with special occasions and gatherings.

In Egyptian culture, serving hamam mahshi is a gesture of hospitality and respect, often reserved for esteemed guests and celebratory events, due to its meticulous preparation.

== Preparation ==
Preparation begins by thoroughly cleaning the pigeons, removing any residual feathers and internal organs. Soaking the birds in water with salt and vinegar for about 10 minutes helps eliminate any gamey odors.

The stuffing typically consists of partially cooked rice or freekeh (toasted, cracked, young green wheat) mixed with grated onions, chopped chicken or pigeon livers, and a blend of spices such as cinnamon, salt, and pepper. Some variations include additional ingredients like almond nuts or herbs to enhance the flavor.

The cavity of each pigeon is carefully filled with the prepared stuffing, ensuring not to overfill to prevent tearing the skin. The openings are then secured using kitchen twine or toothpicks.

The stuffed pigeons are placed in a pot with aromatics such as bay leaves, whole peppercorns, and halved onions. Water is added to cover the birds, and they are simmered until tender. After boiling, the pigeons can be briefly roasted or grilled to achieve a crispy, golden-brown skin.

Hamam mahshi is traditionally served hot, often accompanied by a side of bread, salad, and tahini.

== See also ==
- Egyptian cuisine
- List of Middle Eastern dishes
- List of African dishes
