= Fischbach (Seckach) =

River in Germany

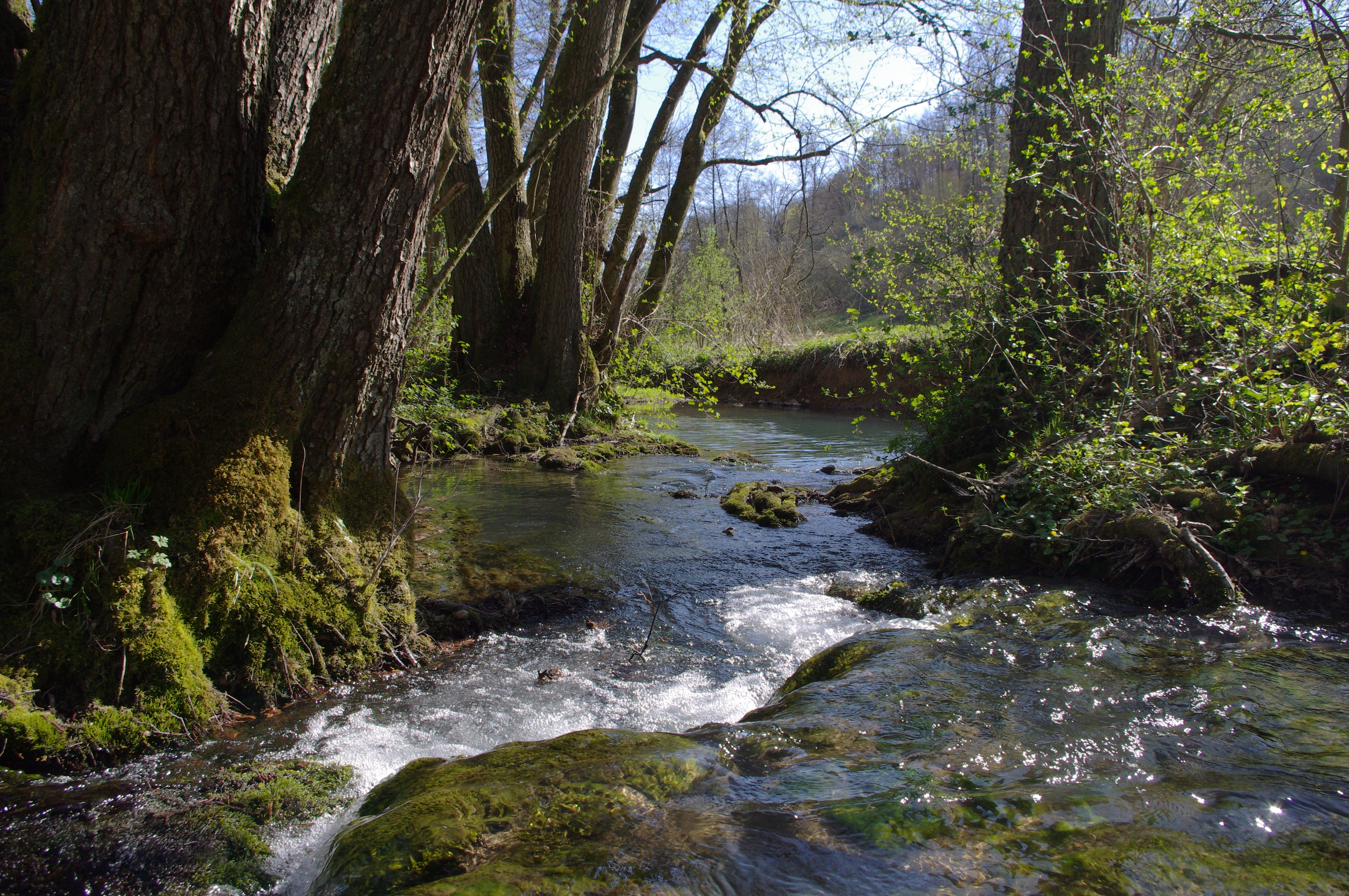

Location
- Country: Germany
- State: Baden-Württemberg

Physical characteristics
- Mouth
  - location: Seckach
  - coordinates: 49.3771°N 9.3691°E

Basin features
- Progression: Seckach→ Jagst→ Neckar→ Rhine→ North Sea

Fischbach (German pronunciation: [ˈfɪʃˌbax]) is a river of Baden-Württemberg, Germany. It flows into the Seckach near Adelsheim.

== See also ==
- List of rivers of Baden-Württemberg
