= Robert Piotrowski =

American architect

Robert Piotrowski (born 1963) is an architect. He leads Ecker Architekten, an Architecture and Interior Design practice based in Buchen, Germany. Piotrowski's projects include the Corporate Headquarters for Holly Hunt, LTD in Chicago, the town halls in Seckach and in Rosenberg, a community center in Zimmern, the Sparkasse in Hettingen, and The House Dandelion Clock, a kindergarten for physically and mentally handicapped children in Buchen.

== Biography ==
Piotrowski was born in Buffalo, New York, United States. He earned a Bachelor of Science in Architecture from the State University of New York at Buffalo in 1984 and a Master of Architecture from the Harvard University Graduate School of Design in 1988. In 1987, he studied at the ETH Zürich – the Swiss Federal University of Technical Studies in Zürich, Switzerland. Prior to founding Ecker Architekten with his partner, Dea Ecker, Piotrowski worked with Powell/Kleinschmidt, Holabird and Root, and Krueck + Sexton in Chicago.

== Awards, honors, publications and positions ==
The work of Robert Piotrowski has been exhibited at the Chicago Athenaeum, The Chicago Architectural Club, and in a traveling exhibit of Beispielhaftes Bauen from the Architectural Association of the State of Baden-Württemberg, Germany. Executed projects have been featured in publications such as Detail, Informationdienst Holz, Glas, [ark], and AIT (Germany), PUU – wood/holz/bois (Finland), Interni (Russia), and Progressive Architecture, Interiors, and Interior Design Magazine in the United States. He has received high honors for his work, including the CCAIA Honor Award for the Chicago-Kent College of Law in 1992 and for the Galter Health Sciences Library at Northwestern University in 1997, the honor of Beispielhaftes Bauen for the Community Center in Zimmern and the Kindergarten Dandelion Clock in 2007, and the award of Gute Bauten from the Bund Deutscher Architekten for the Town Hall in Seckach and the Community Center in Zimmern in 2008. Ecker Architekten is a nominee for the Hugo Häring Preis in 2009 In a recent hardware design competition sponsored by Colombo Design s.p.a., their entry was one of 16 finalists among 6209 entries from 103 countries

Piotrowski has taught architecture as an adjunct associate professor at the College of Architecture at the Illinois Institute of Technology from 1996 to 2000. He was the Droste Visiting Lecturer for the IIT Paris Program in 2003, and assisted students in an IIT design-build studio in the summer of 2009. He has been a guest critic at various schools of architecture including the Massachusetts Institute of Technology, The University of Illinois at Chicago, the University of Wisconsin–Milwaukee, and the University of Southern California in Los Angeles.

== Publications ==
- Bank Building - March 2012
- Play Indoor & Outdoor - 2011
- Closer to God: Religious Architecture and Sacred Spaces - September 2010
- Kindergartens - Educational Spaces - 2010
- Architektur in Baden-Württemberg - 2009
- Interni - January 2009
- Glas - January 2009
- PUU- Wood/Holz/Bois - January 2009
- Informationdienst Holz - December 2008
- ark - October 2008
- Interni - August 2008
- Scala 2015 - May 2008
- Detail- Konzept/Kindergartens - March 2008
- Architektur neues Baden-Württemberg - 2007
- Influence Across Fields - The Chicago Architectural Club Journal 10 - 2002
- Positions in Architecture - The Chicago Architectural Club Journal 9 - 2001
