= Grünke =

Grünke is a surname of German origin.

== People with the surname ==
- Julian Grünke (born 1995), German politician
- Klaus-Jürgen Grünke (born 1951), German cyclist

== See also ==
- Grünkern
