= Eberstadt Stalactite Cave =

Cave in Germany

Eberstadter Tropfsteinhöhle
- Eberstadt Stalactite Cave
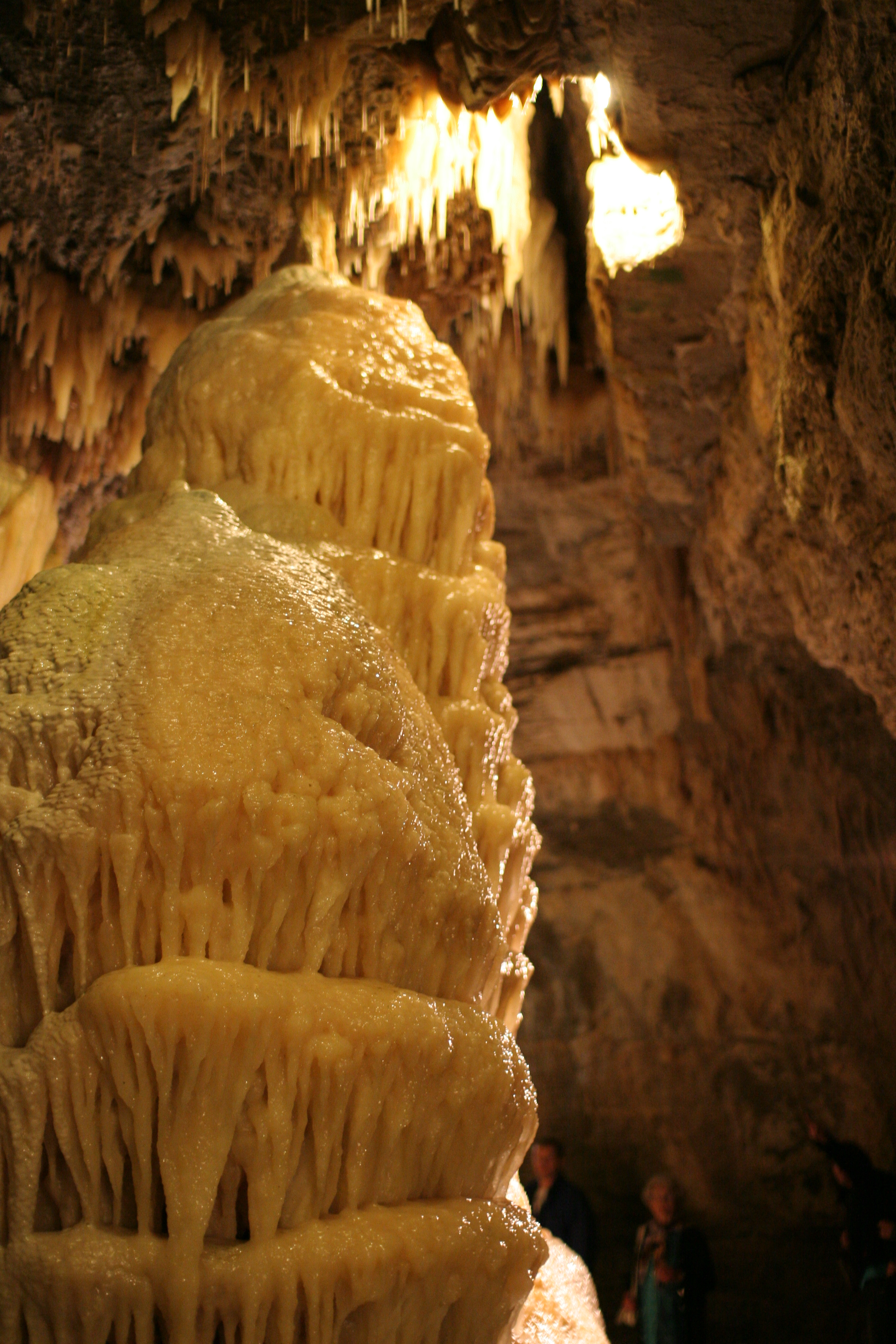
- The wedding cake one of the stalagmites in Eberstadt
- Interactive map of Eberstadter Tropfsteinhöhle
- Location: Buchen, Baden-Württemberg, Germany
- Coordinates: 48.2565°N 9.4482°E
- Length: 645 metres (show cave is 588 metres)
- Discovery: 1971
- Geology: Karst, limestone
- Show cave opened: 1973
- Lighting: electric
- Visitors: 57.900(2012–2016)
- Website: Official website

The Eberstadt Stalactite Cave (or Eberstadter Tropfsteinhöhle) is a German show cave located in Bauland at the transition of Southeastern Odenwald forest in the North of Baden-Württemberg. It is near Eberstadt, a District of Buchen, around 70 kilometres (43 mi) east of Heidelberg and 100 km (62 mi) north of Stuttgart. The cave is around 600 metres (1,969 ft) long, lies 341 m (1,119 ft) above sea level and is estimated to be 3 to 5 million years old. It was discovered in December 1971 after blasting operations in a Muschelkalk quarry, and opened to the public in 1973. Since then it has been used as a show cave and is one of the attractions of the "Geo-Nature park Bergstrasse-Odenwald".

The cave entrance is angled several times and in some instances only 1.5 m (4 ft 11 in) high, and has halls up to 6-metre (20 ft) high. It lies in the lower Muschelkalk and contains rich stalactite ornaments such as slender and cone-like stalagmites and sinter flags, sinter terraces and crystals. As the cave was closed after its discovery and guided tours have only used electric light, the dripstones have been preserved are mostly still chalk-white; this is in contrast to older German show caves in where candles and torches were used which lead to the blackened of stones. The Eberstadter Tropfsteinhöhle is thought to be one of the most beautiful show caves in Germany.

== About the cave ==
The Eberstadt Stalactite Cave is a dripstone cave in Bauland at the transition of Southeastern Odenwald in the North of Baden-Württemberg. It is near Eberstadt, a District of Buchen, around 70 km (43 mi) east of Heidelberg and 100 km (62 mi) north of Stuttgart.

The cave is 600 m (1,970 ft) long, its width varies between 2–7 m (6.6–23.0 ft), and the height between 2.5–8 m (8.2–26.2 ft). The cave temperature is constant at 11 °C (52 °F) year-round, with a humidity of approximately 95%. The age of the cave is estimated at between one and two million years. During this time, all forms of sintering on the walls or on the cave floor have been created, including stalactites (dripping stones hanging from the cave ceiling) and stalagmite drips that grow up from the cave bottom.

Visitor access to the cave is by trails, and it is accessible for wheelchair users. It was adapted for high numbers of visitors, with a large parking lot at the foot of the cave, including for tourist buses. In 2011 a small visitor center opened with its architecture intending to symbolize the crevices and distortions of the Muschelkalk. It informs about landscape development in the karst of the area and the development of the cave. The city staffs tourguides, who lead groups through the cave for about an hour year-round between March and the end of October every day, during the winter months only on weekends and holidays. In 1995, a less than one-kilometer-long geological trail (0.6-mile) was created into the mining areas of the neighboring quarry. Information panels explain about the origin of the dripstone cave and the most important geological formations in Baden-Württemberg on the basis of exposed rock patterns.

== History ==
The cave owes its discovery to chance in a limestone quarry: On December 13, 1971, a larger cavity was drilled in preparation of a blasting. After part of the demolished material had been cleared, a fresh cave wall running east to west, about eight meters high above the quarry floor and about ten meters below the upper level, showed a cavern opening about two meters wide and one meter high.

The floor of the cave covered a layer of clay about one to one and a half meters thick. The water was 10 to 15 centimeters above loamy-soft ground. The visit was therefore laborious at first. The most difficult passage was at Vesuvius, where a rock stage with a rope ladder, later with wooden ladders, had to be overcome.

The press was informed how preliminary explorations revealed the beauty of a natural monument, unique in southern Germany. On the same day the news of the cave discovery spread in the village. Many inhabitants went to the quarry to get a personal impression. Photographs still show intact dripping stones which were later damaged. On 14 December, the press and television reported on the discovery. On the following days the television broadcast several special transmissions, which made the cave widely known. In January 1972 the TV stations made further records of the cave, which showed it in its original, still untouched state. Immediately after the discovery, rumors spread that the cave was not stable and was to be closed again. In order to procure souvenirs, several people pushed into the cave and knocked dripping stones off.

Because the cave was particularly large and beautiful, and the dripping stones had a great variety of forms, it was found worthy for preservation and development. The Landratsamt Buchen presented them with an interim injunction under nature protection, and 6 years later it was classified as a natural monument (FND).

On 15 December 1971 the District Office of Buchen ordered the demolition of the stone quarries. Later, investigations of the stability of the cave ridges and the drip stones showed that quarrying could be maintained at the same time as the cave was used. The explosions in the quarry resumed at a minimum distance of 50 meters to the cave and an important employer of the municipality remained. On December 16, 1971, the town council decided to expand the dripstone cave into a show cave. In order to protect it against further damage, first the entrance was walled in and a door installed. This, too, proved unsuccessful as thieves descended from above and broke the door. Only barbed wire guards above and below the entrance and an additional state police patrol service each night succeeded. Geologists and cave explorers traveled to visit the cave. Experts from the Geological Land Office, the Association of German Cave and Karst Researchers and the Nature Conservation Commissioners advised on the expansion of the cave.

== See also ==
- List of show caves in Germany

== Literature ==
- Klaus Dobat; Horst Eichler; Herbert W. Franke; Gerhard Fritz; Schriftleiter Hans Binder (1998). Verband der Deutschen Höhlen- und Karstforscher e. V. (ed.). Die Eberstadter Tropfsteinhöhle. Abhandlungen zur Karst- und Höhlenkunde. Vol. Reihe A, Speläologie, Heft 12 (5th ed.). Blaubeuren: Fr. Mangold‘schen Buchhandlung. ISSN 0567-4956.
- Wilhelm Eberle (1987). Entdeckung und Ausbau der Eberstadter Tropfsteinhöhle. Buchen: Druckerei Odenwälder Buchen.
- Bernd Fischer; Wolfgang Hauck; Gabriele Kammerer; Walter Kammerer; Jochen Schwab; Felicitas Zemelka (2006). Eberstadter Höhlenwelten. Der Wartturm – Heimatblätter des Vereins Bezirksmuseum Buchen e. V. Buchen: Verein Bezirksmuseum Buchen e. V. ISSN 0723-7553.
- Horst Eichler; C. Mahn; A. Scheuerbrandt (1977). Verband der Deutschen Höhlen- und Karstforscher e. V. (ed.). Die Eberstadter Tropfsteinhöhle – Eine fremdenverkehrsgeographische Studie. Abhandlungen zur Karst- und Höhlenkunde. Vol. Reihe A, Heft 16.
- Horst Eichler (1980). Höhlenklima und speläometeorologische Phänomene der Eberstadter Tropfsteinhöhle. Zugleich ein Beitrag zur thermischen Belastung von Schauhöhlen durch hohe Besucherzahlen. Karst und Höhle. Vol. 1978/1979. pp. 75–82.
- P. Henne (1977). Verband der Deutschen Höhlen- und Karstforscher e. V. (ed.). Geologisch-physikalische Untersuchungen über die Eberstadter Tropfsteinhöhle. Abhandlungen zur Karst- und Höhlenkunde. Vol. Reihe A, Heft 16.
- Petra Schad (1983). Die "Lampenflora" der Eberstadter Tropfsteinhöhle (Neckar-Odenwald-Kreis) (Unpublished thesis). Universität Tübingen.
- Ernst Waldemar Bauer (2001). Wunderwelt der Höhlen. Esslingen: Bechtle Publisher. p. 151. ISBN 3-7628-0565-2.
- Stephan Kempe, Wilfried Rosendahl, ed. (2008). Höhlen – Verborgene Welten. Stuttgart: Primus Publisher. p. 155. ISBN 978-3-89678-611-1.
- Hans Binder; Anke Luz; Hans Martin Luz (1993). Schauhöhlen in Deutschland. Ulm: Aegis Publisher. pp. 66–67. ISBN 3-87005-040-3.
- Stephan Kempe, ed. (1997). Welt voller Geheimnisse – Höhlen. HB Bildatlas Sonderausgabe 17. Hamburg: HB Publishers- und Vertriebs-Gesellschaft. p. 99. ISBN 3-616-06739-1.
