= Rosenberg (Baden) =

- Municipality
- Coat of arms

- Location of Rosenberg within Neckar-Odenwald-Kreis district
- Interactive map of Rosenberg
- Location within Germany Location within Baden-Württemberg
- Coordinates: 49°27′23″N 9°28′28″E
- Country: Germany
- State: Baden-Württemberg
- Admin. region: Karlsruhe
- District: Neckar-Odenwald-Kreis
- Subdivisions: 4

Government
  - Mayor (2018–26): Ralph Matousek (Ind.)

Area
  - Total: 40.94 km^{2} (15.81 sq mi)
- Elevation: 352 m (1,155 ft)

Population (2025-12-31)
  - Total: 1,995
  - Density: 48.73/km^{2} (126.2/sq mi)
- Time zone: UTC+01:00 (CET)
  - Summer (DST): UTC+02:00 (CEST)
- Postal codes: 74749
- Dialling codes: 06295
- Vehicle registration: MOS
- Website: www.rosenberg-baden.de

Rosenberg (German pronunciation: [ˈʁoːzn̩bɛʁk]) is a Franconian municipality in the district of Neckar-Odenwald-Kreis, in Baden-Württemberg, Germany, about 26 km northeast of Mosbach. It belongs to the European metropolitan region of Rhine-Neckar.

== Geography ==
=== Location ===
Rosenberg lies in the Muschelkalk hill country of the Bauland region and is one-third forested. The municipal area is drained by the Kirnau river.

=== Municipal divisions ===
The municipality of Rosenberg includes the former municipalities of Bronnacker, Hirschlanden and Sindolsheim. The municipality of Rosenberg within the boundaries of 1970 included the village (formerly a minor town) of Rosenberg, the locality Siedlung Dörrhof, and the houses Gaimühle and Talmühle.

The municipality of Rosenberg in 1970 included the deserted villages of Mensingenheim and the demolished Neumühle. The deserted village of Mettelheim is included in the area of the former municipality of Sindolsheim.

== History ==
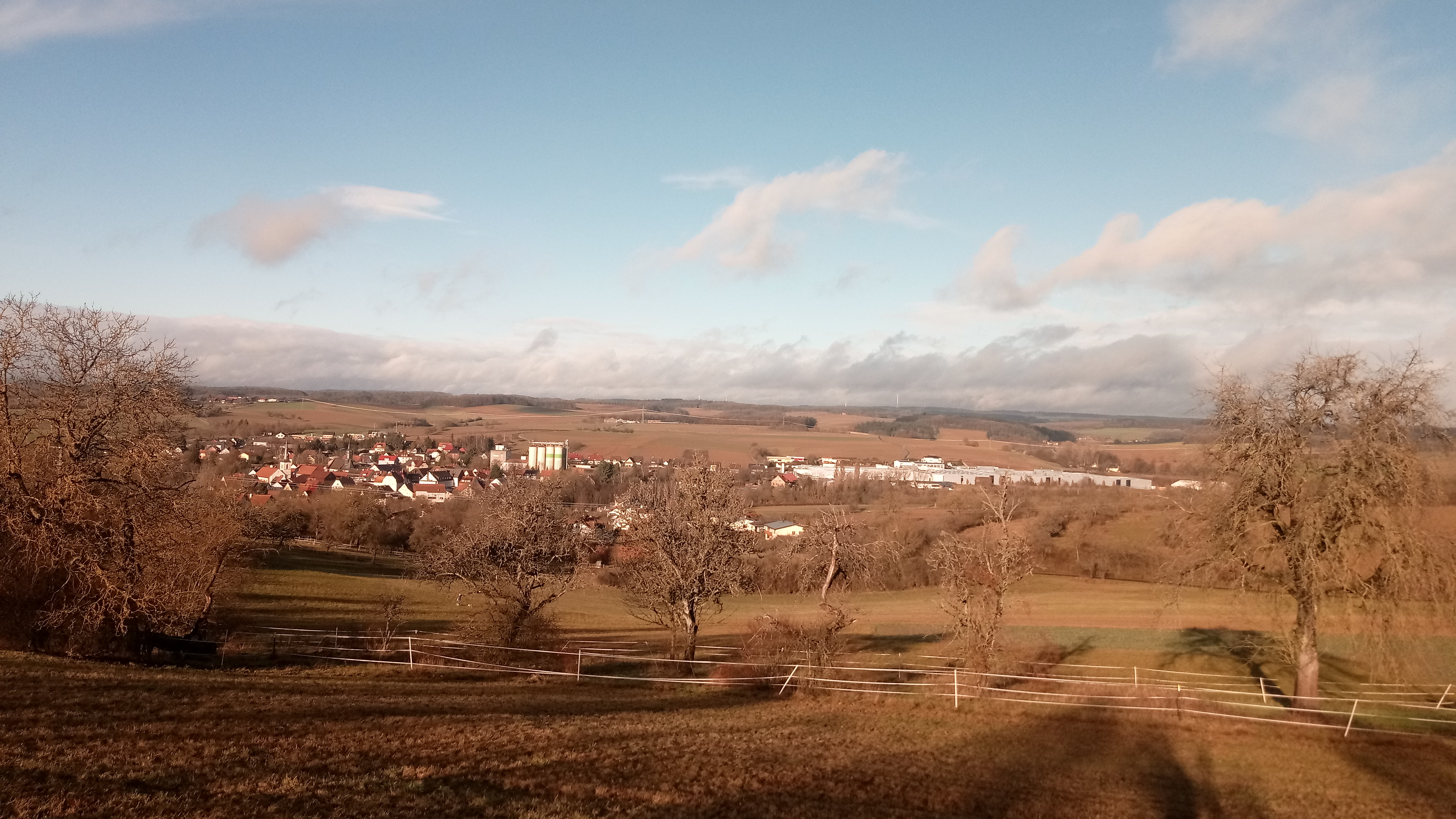
View of Rosenberg

=== 13th to 19th centuries ===
Rosenberg was first documented in 1251. At the end of the 13th century, the town fell to the Bishopric of Würzburg, which granted it as a fief to the Lords of Rosenberg, and after their extinction in 1632 to the Lords of Hatzfeld. In 1682, Rosenberg was placed under the German Order Bailiwick of Franconia. 50 years later, the Princes of Löwenstein-Wertheim became the feudal lords. As a result of the mediatization due to the Principal Conclusion of the Imperial Deputation in 1803, Rosenberg fell to the Principality of Leiningen. When this was dissolved in 1806 due to the Act of the Confederation of the Rhine, the town came to the Grand Duchy of Baden. Rosenberg was connected to the railway in 1866. The palace built in 1582 was destroyed by a fire in 1926.

=== 20th century onward ===
Electrification took place in 1909, the town hall was built in 1947, and the Rosenberg plant of the GETRAG company was founded in 1970.

On 1 July 1971, Bronnacker was incorporated. On 1 January 1972, Rosenberg merged with Hirschlanden and Sindolsheim to form the new municipality of Rosenberg. This belonged to the Buchen district, which merged with the Mosbach district in 1973 to form today's Neckar-Odenwald district.

== Religions ==
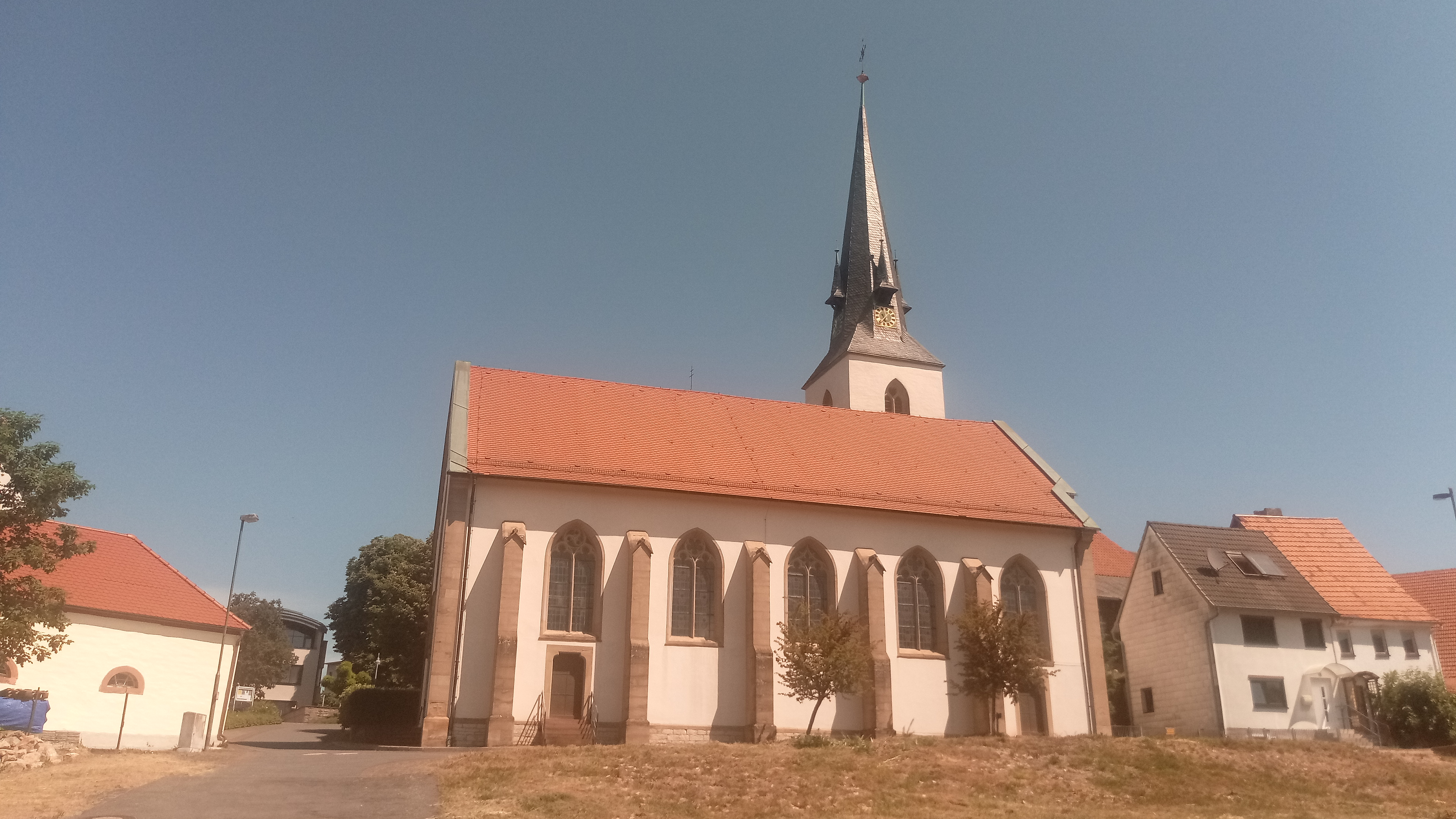
Evangelical Church

Despite the overlordship of the Bishopric of Würzburg, the Lords of Rosenberg as feudal lords were able to introduce the Reformation in 1558. Even when the Roman Catholic Lords of Hatzfeld were enfeoffed with the feudal lordship, the town remained Protestant. In the 21st century, the Protestants and Catholics populations are roughly equal.

Hirschlanden, a district of Rosenberg, is the seat of the Adelsheim-Boxberg Church District of the Evangelical Lutheran Church in Baden.

== Politics ==
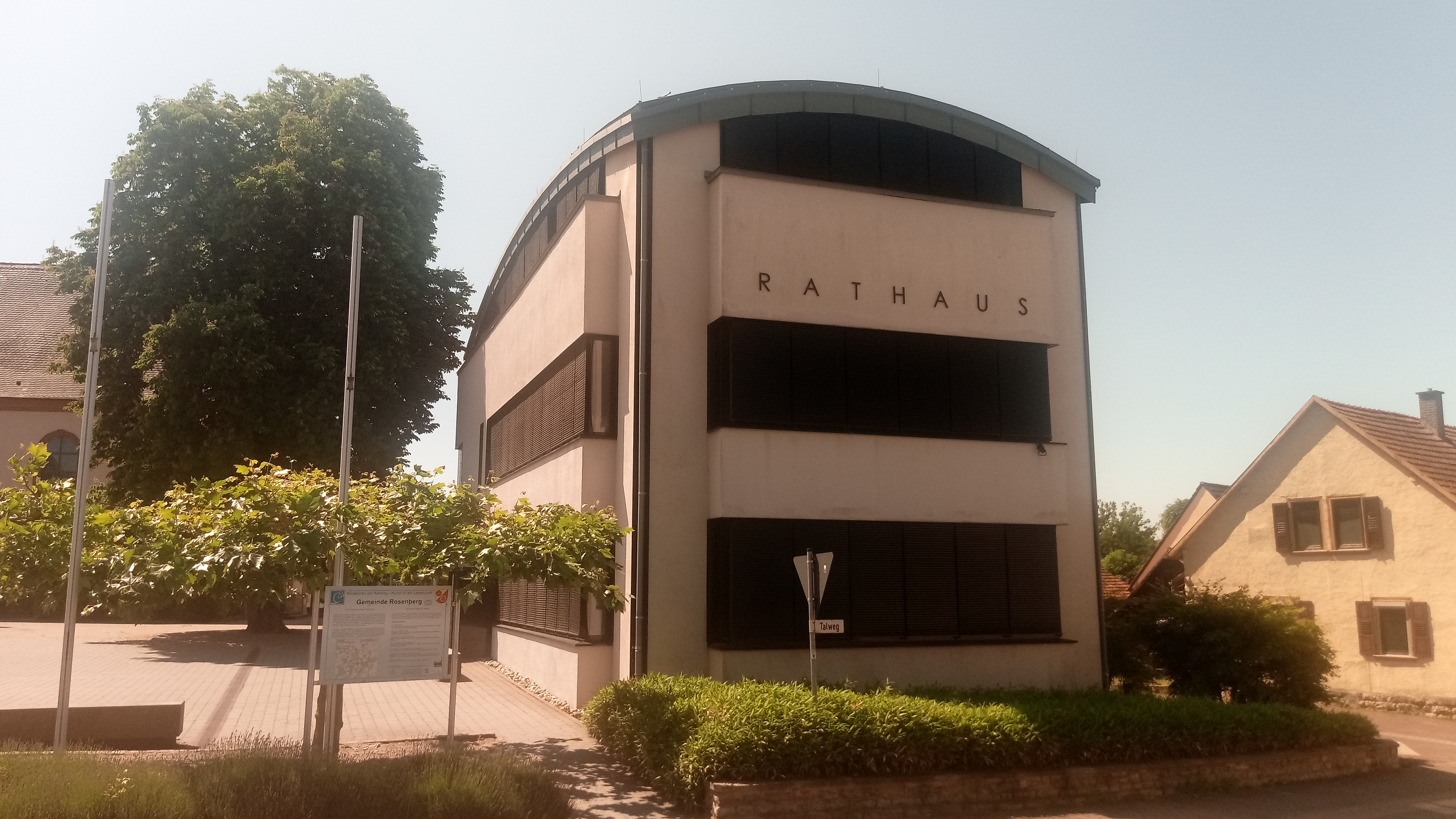
Town Hall

=== Municipal council ===
The municipal council normally has 13 voluntary members, elected for five years. Often the number of members increases due to compensatory seats (total 2019: 14 seats). In addition, the mayor acts as the voting chairman of the municipal council.

The "semi-genuine local election" guarantees the districts a fixed number of seats: at least six from Rosenberg, at least three each from Hirschlanden and Sindolsheim, and at least one from Bronnacker.

The 2019 local election led to the following result (in brackets: difference from 2014):

Municipal Council 2019
Party/List	Vote Share	Seats
Citizens' List (BL)	71.3% (+9.3)	10 (+1)
Independent List (UL)	28.7% (-9.2)	4 (−2)
Voter turnout: 68.9% (+4.6)

In Bronnacker, Hirschlanden and Sindolsheim, district administrations in the sense of the Baden-Württemberg municipal code are also established, each with its own district council and head of the district administration as chairman.

=== Mayor ===
The mayor is directly elected for eight years.

- 1972–1976: Emil Kistner
- 1976–1999: Arno Hagenbuch
- 1999–2019: Gerhard Baar
- Since 2019: Ralph Matousek

=== Coat of arms ===
Blazon: "Per bend sinister Or and Gules, in dexter a Rose with barbed seeded proper, in sinister a Wheel with eight spokes Or."

The coat of arms tinctured in the Baden colors (red-yellow) contains a canting charge for the town name with the rose, and a sign of the historical rule, as it appears in the crest of the Lords of Rosenberg and in the coat of arms of the County and Principality of Wertheim. The wheel is said to refer to the former feudal lordship of Kurmainz over the municipal district of Sindolsheim.

=== Coats of arms of the districts ===
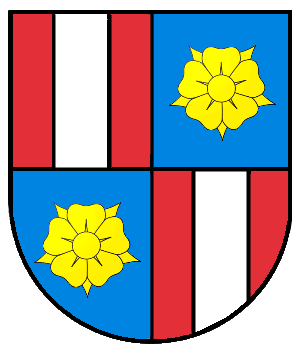
Bronnacker - "Quarterly, 1 and 4 Gules a Pale Argent, 2 and 3 Azure a Rose Or."

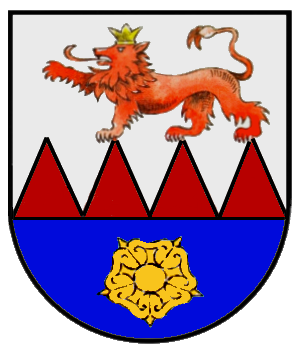
Hirschlanden - "Over a base Azure, therein a Rose Or, in Argent four Lozenges Gules on the partition, stalking a Lion Gules crowned Or."

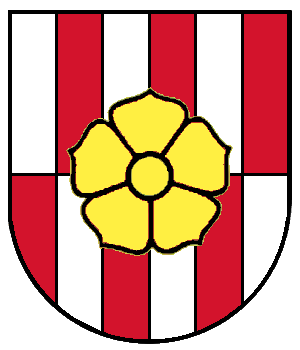
Rosenberg, old coat of arms - "Per bend sinister Argent and Gules five times counterchanged, charged with a Rose unbended Or seeded and barbed proper."

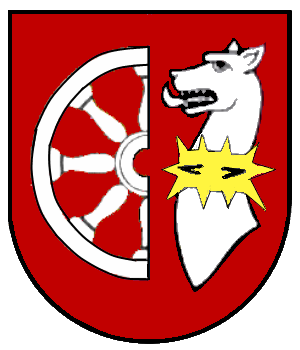
Sindolsheim - "Gules, in dexter a Demi-Wheel of eight spokes Argent, in sinister the hind part of a Dog Argent with Ruff rayonny Or."

== Buildings and cultural monuments ==
The well near the Krone inn in the Sindolsheim district is one of the three historic village wells dating from before 1800.

== Economy and infrastructure ==
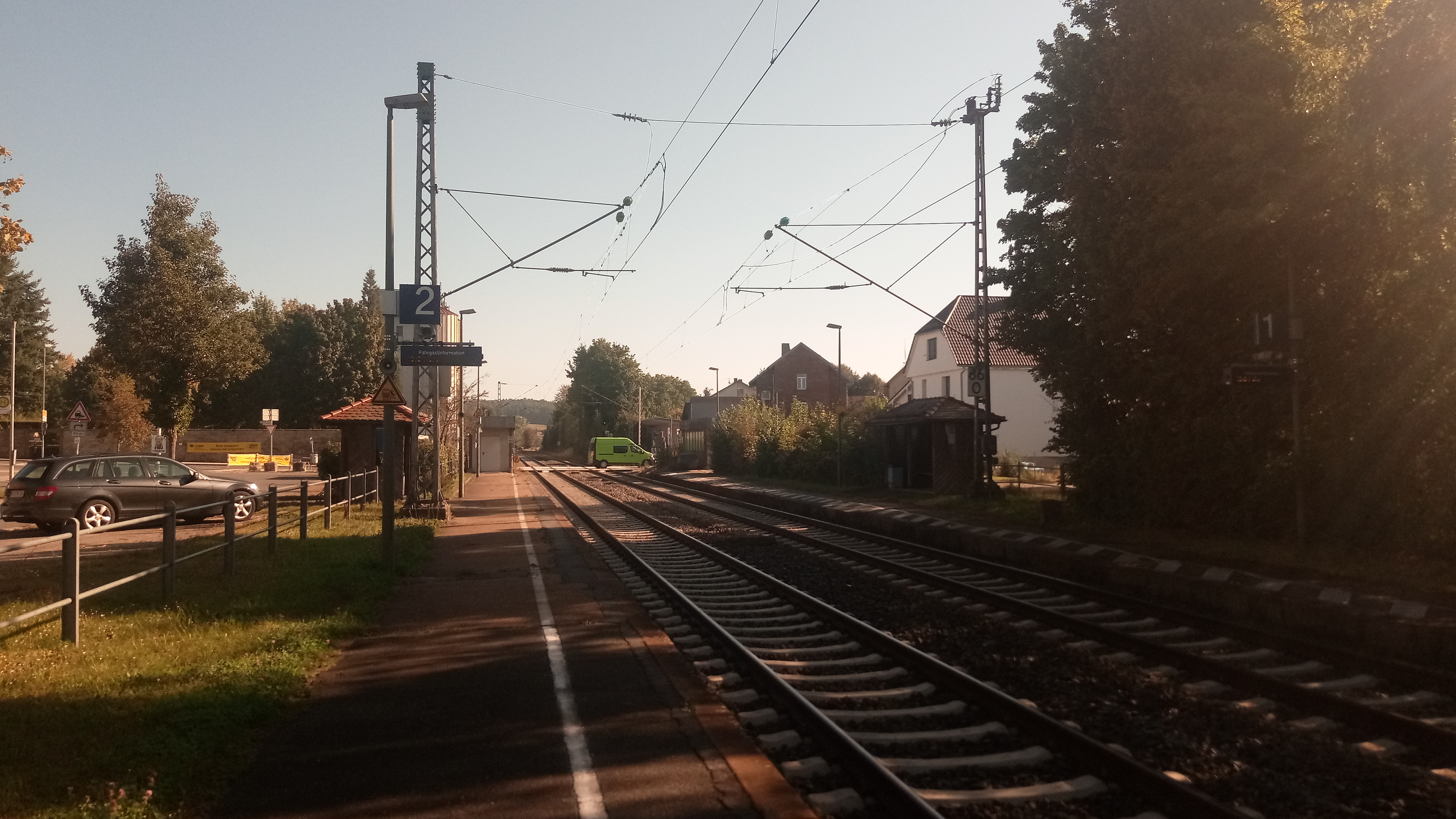
Rosenberg (Baden) Stop

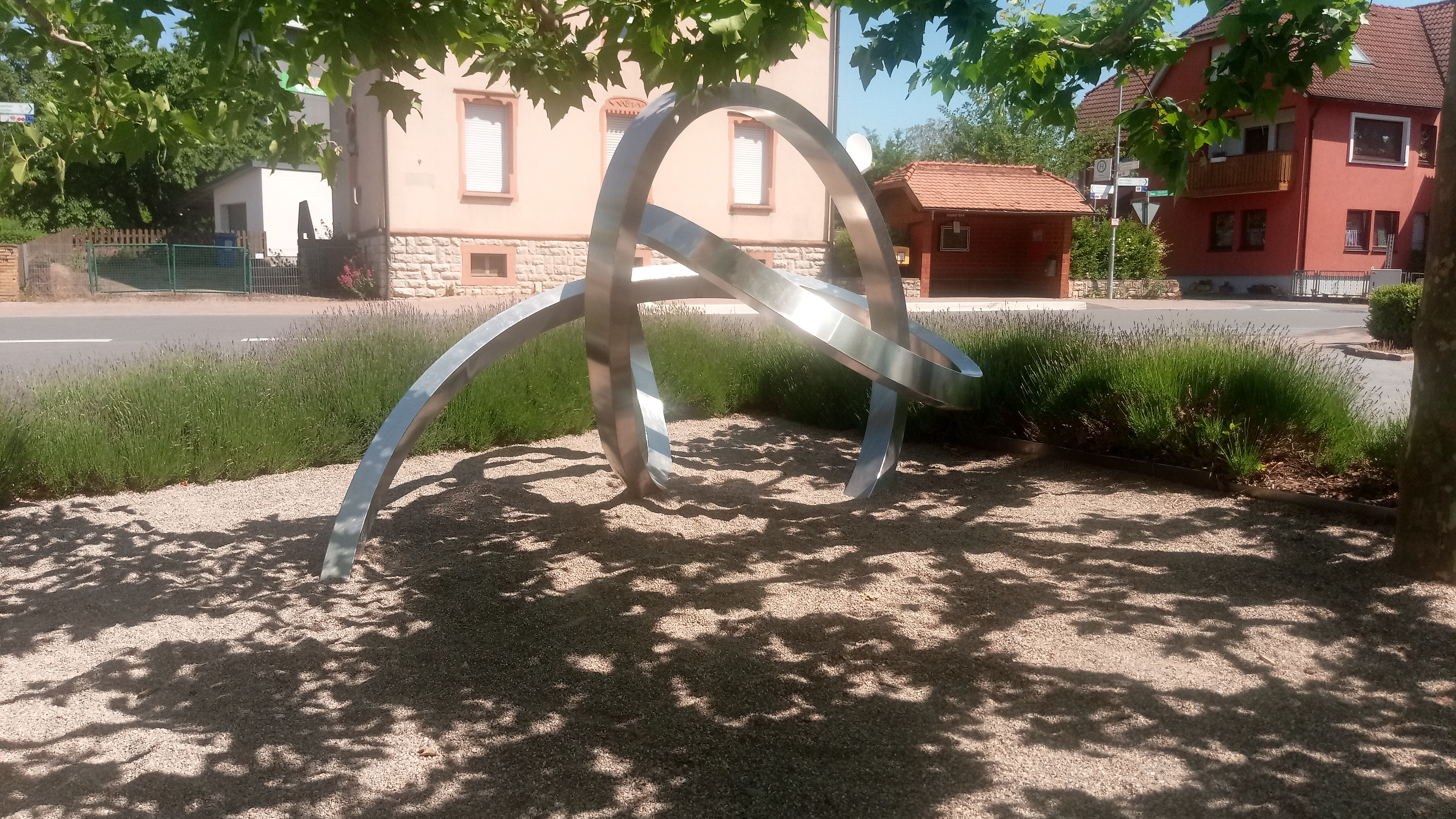
Sculpture by Thomas Otto

=== Local companies ===
The Rosenberg plant of Getrag, a manufacturer of automotive transmissions, is one of the most important employers in the region with more than 540 jobs.

=== Transportation ===
The municipal area is located on the A81 highway between Heilbronn and Würzburg and can be accessed via the Boxberg (5) or Osterburken (6) exits.

Rosenberg has a stop on the Franconian Railway (Stuttgart–Würzburg) that ran on weekdays during peak hours until 2019. Since 15 December 2019, there has been a trial operation with hourly stops Monday to Friday between Osterburken and Lauda.

Its station building was built in 1865 and was demolished in 2016 after years of decay, despite being a protected monument. A stop in Hirschlanden has not existed since the mid-1980s.

The municipality of Rosenberg is part of the Sculpture Cycle Trail.
