= Seckach (Jagst) =

River in Germany

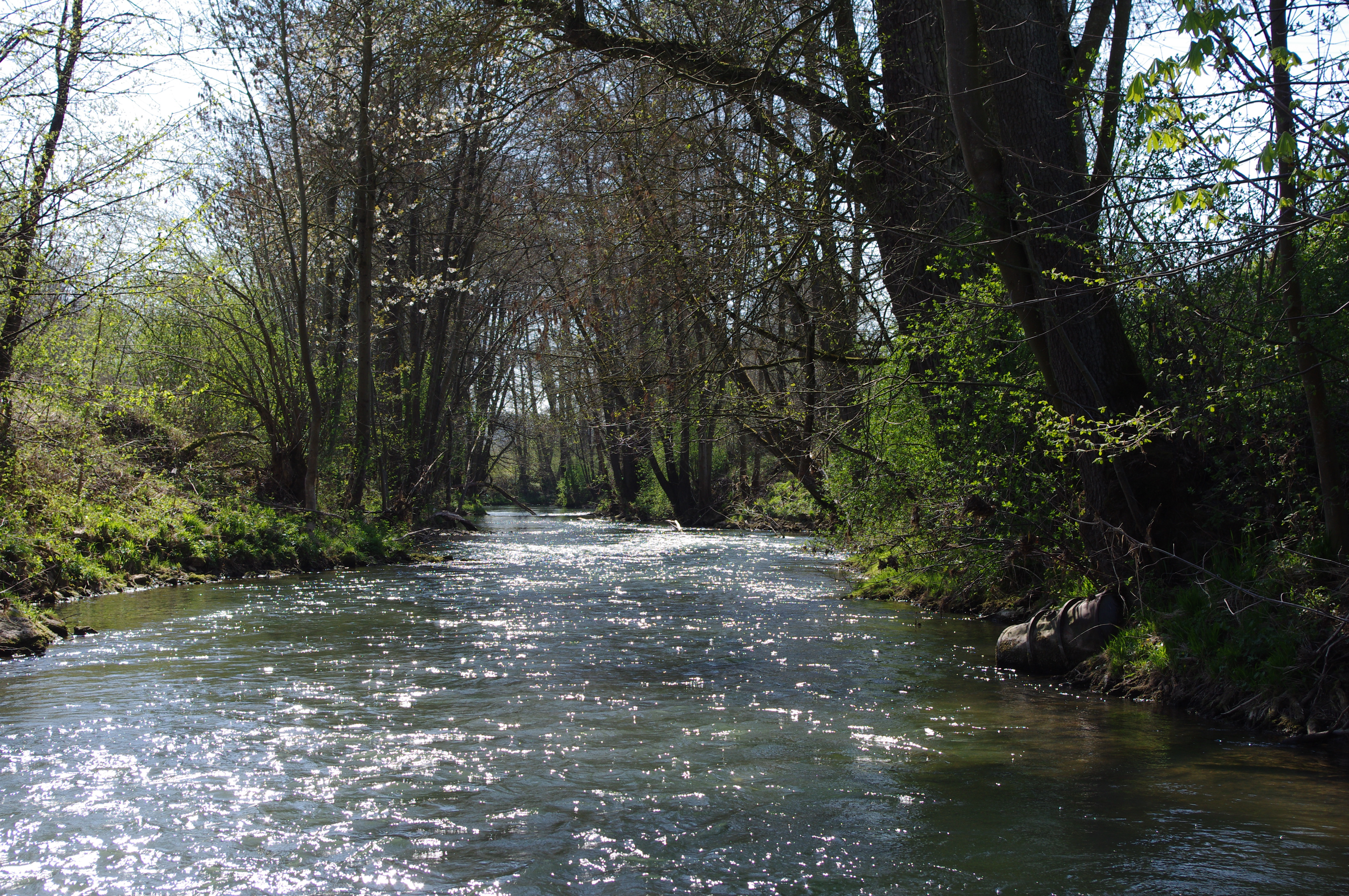

Location
- Country: Germany
- State: Baden-Württemberg

Physical characteristics
- Mouth
  - location: Jagst
  - coordinates: 49.3197°N 9.3596°E
- Length: 29.2 km (18.1 mi)
- Basin size: 261 km^{2} (101 sq mi)

Basin features
- Progression: Jagst→ Neckar→ Rhine→ North Sea
- Tributaries
  - left: Kirnau
  - right: Fischbach

The Seckach is a river of Baden-Württemberg, Germany. It passes through the village of Seckach and flows into the Jagst in Möckmühl.

== See also ==
- List of rivers of Baden-Württemberg
