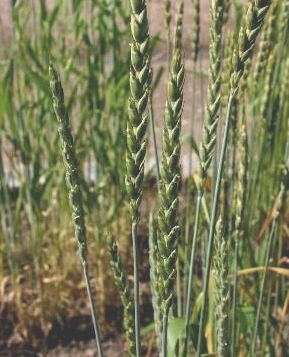

Scientific classification
- Kingdom: Plantae
- Clade: Embryophytes
- Clade: Tracheophytes
- Clade: Spermatophytes
- Clade: Angiosperms
- Clade: Monocots
- Clade: Commelinids
- Order: Poales
- Family: Poaceae
- Subfamily: Pooideae
- Genus: Triticum
- Species: T. spelta

Binomial name
- Triticum spelta L.

Synonyms
- Spelta vulgaris Ser.; Triticum aestivum ssp. spelta (L.) Thell; Triticum arias Clemente; Triticum elymoides Hornem.; Triticum forskalei Clemente; Triticum palmovae G.I.Ivanov; Triticum rufescens Steud. nom. inval.; Triticum speltiforme Seidl ex Opiz; Triticum speltoides Flaksb. nom. inval.; Triticum zea Host; Zeia spelta (L.) Lunell

= Spelt =

Species of wheat

Spelt (Triticum spelta), also known as dinkel wheat, is a species of wheat. It is a relict crop, eaten in Central Europe and northern Spain. It is high in protein. In Australia it is marketed as a health food.

Spelt was cultivated from the Neolithic period onward. It was a staple food in parts of Europe from the Bronze Age to the Middle Ages. It is used in baking, and is made into bread, pasta, and beer.

It is sometimes considered a subspecies of the closely related common wheat (T. aestivum), with the botanical name Triticum aestivum subsp. spelta. It is a hexaploid, most likely a hybrid of wheat and emmer.

== Description ==
Spelt is a species of Triticum, a large stout grass similar to bread wheat. Its flowering spike is slenderer than that of bread wheat; when ripe, it bends somewhat from the vertical. The spike is roughly four-edged. The axis of the spike is brittle and divided into segments; it shatters into separate segments when fully ripe. Spelt differs from bread wheat in that each seed (a caryopsis, botanically a fruit with its wall fused to the single seed inside) stays fully encapsulated by its husk.

== Confusion with other wheats ==
Especially in the context of descriptions of ancient cultures, the English word spelt has sometimes been used for grains that were not T. spelta, but other species of hulled wheat such as T. dicoccum (emmer) or T. monococcum (einkorn, also known as "little spelt", in French petit épeautre). This confusion may arise either from mistranslation of words found in other languages that can denote hulled wheat in general (such as Italian farro, which can denote any of emmer, spelt or einkorn; spelt is sometimes distinguished as farro grande ('large farro'), emmer as farro medio ('medium farro'), and einkorn as farro piccolo ('little farro')), or changing opinions about which actual species of wheat are described in texts written in ancient languages. Thus, the meaning of the ancient Greek word ζειά (zeiá) or ζέα is either uncertain or vague, and has been argued to denote einkorn or emmer rather than spelt. The ancient Roman grain denoted by the Latin word far, although often translated as 'spelt', was in fact emmer.

== Evolution ==
=== Hybridisation and polyploidy ===
Like common wheat, spelt is a hexaploid wheat species, which means it has six sets of chromosomes. It is derived from a hybridisation event between a domesticated tetraploid wheat such as durum wheat and another wheat species, increasing the number of sets of chromosomes. Genetic evidence indicates an initial hybridisation of a domesticated tetraploid wheat and the diploid wild goat-grass Aegilops tauschii. It further shows that spelt could have arisen as the result of a second hybridisation, this time of bread wheat and emmer, giving rise to European spelt. The spelt genome continues to influence the breeding of modern hexaploid bread wheat through recent hybridisation.

Spelt most likely originated as a hybrid of bread wheat and emmer. It continues to influence modern breeds of bread wheat.

Spelt, being closely related to bread wheat, is a likely source of alleles to increase wheat's genetic diversity, and so improve crop yields. Analysis of the Oberkulmer cultivar of spelt found 40 alleles that could contribute to increased yield. Among the differences were spelt's larger grain size, greater fertility of tillers, and longer fruiting spikes. Pm5 is an effector-triggered resistance gene for powdery mildew.

=== History of cultivation ===
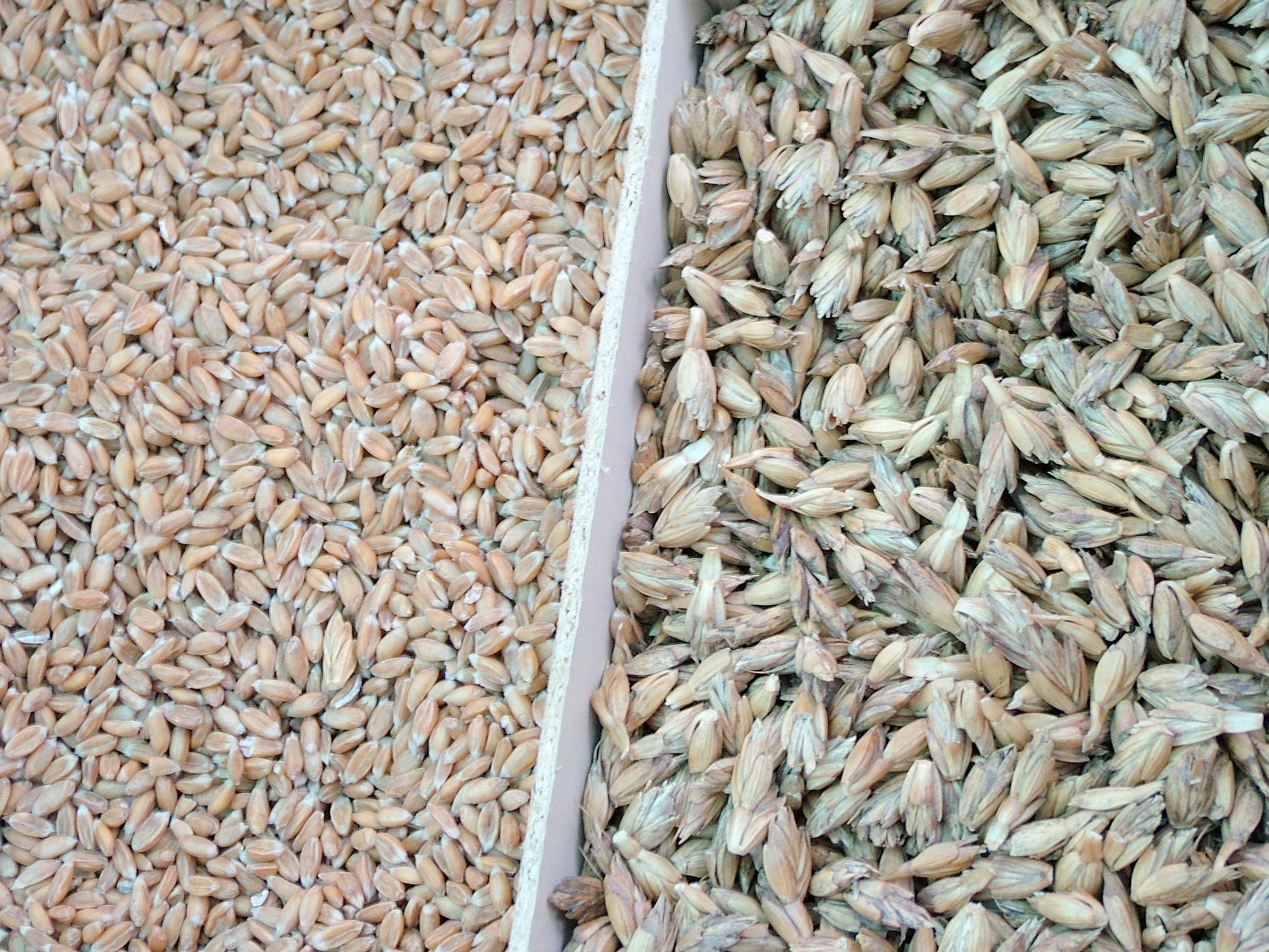
Without and with husks: the husks make spelt suitable for cold climates.

Spelt has been cultivated since approximately 5000 BCE. In the fifth millennium BCE, there are archaeological remains in the north of Iraq and in Transcaucasia, north-east of the Black Sea. Much more evidence comes from Europe. Remains of spelt have been found in Denmark, Germany, and Poland from the later Neolithic (dating from 2500–1700 BCE). Evidence of spelt has been found from across central Europe from the Bronze Age. In the south of Germany and Switzerland in the Iron Age (750–15 BCE), it was a major type of wheat, while by 500 BCE, it had in addition become widespread in the south of Britain. There is evidence that spelt cultivation increased in Iron Age Britain as damp regions of the country with heavy soils tolerated by spelt were being settled.

In the Middle Ages, spelt was cultivated in parts of Switzerland, Tyrol, Germany, northern France and the southern Low Countries. Spelt became a major crop in Europe in the 9th century CE, possibly because it is more suitable for storage and being husked makes it more adaptable to cold climates.

Spelt was introduced to the United States in the 1890s. In the 20th century, spelt was replaced by bread wheat in almost all areas where it was still grown. The organic farming movement revived its popularity somewhat toward the end of the 20th century, as spelt requires less fertilizer. Since the beginning of the 21st century, spelt has become a common wheat substitute for making artisanal loaves of bread, pasta, and flakes. By 2014, the grain was popular in the UK, Kazakhstan, and Ukraine. In the United States, most spelt is grown in Ohio as of 2022.

== Nutrition ==
Spelt, uncooked
Nutritional value per 100 g (3.5 oz)
- Energy: 1,410 kJ (340 kcal)
- Carbohydrates: 70.19 g
- Starch: 53.92 g
- Dietary fibre: 10.7 g
- Fat: 2.43 g
- Polyunsaturated: 1.258 g
- Protein: 14.57 g
Vitamins and minerals
Vitamins	Quantity %DV^{†}
Thiamine (B1)	30% 0.364 mg
Riboflavin (B2)	9% 0.113 mg
Niacin (B3)	43% 6.843 mg
Vitamin B6	14% 0.230 mg
Folate (B9)	11% 45 μg
Vitamin E	5% 0.79 mg
Minerals	Quantity %DV^{†}
Calcium	2% 27 mg
Iron	25% 4.44 mg
Magnesium	32% 136 mg
Manganese	130% 3.0 mg
Phosphorus	32% 401 mg
Potassium	13% 388 mg
Sodium	0% 8 mg
Zinc	30% 3.28 mg
- Other constituents: Quantity
- Water: 11.02 g
- Full USDA Nutrient Report
- ^{†}Percentages estimated using US recommendations for adults, except for potassium, which is estimated based on expert recommendation from the National Academies.

A 100-gram (3 1/2-ounce) reference serving of uncooked spelt provides 1,400 kilojoules (340 kilocalories) of food energy and is a rich source (20% or more of the Daily Value) of protein, dietary fiber, several B vitamins, and numerous dietary minerals (table). Highest nutrient contents include manganese (143% DV), phosphorus (57% DV), and niacin (46% DV). Spelt contains about 70% total carbohydrates, including 11% as dietary fibre, and is low in fat (table).

Spelt contains gluten, and is therefore suitable for baking, but this component makes it unsuitable for people with gluten-related disorders, such as celiac disease. In comparison to hard red winter wheat, spelt has a more soluble protein matrix characterized by a higher gliadin:glutenin ratio.

== Products ==
In Germany and Austria, spelt loaves and rolls (Dinkelbrot) are widely available in bakeries. The unripe spelt grains are dried and eaten as Grünkern ("green grain"). In Australia it is grown organically for the health food market. Dutch jenever makers sometimes distil with spelt, while beer brewed from spelt exists in Bavaria and Belgium.

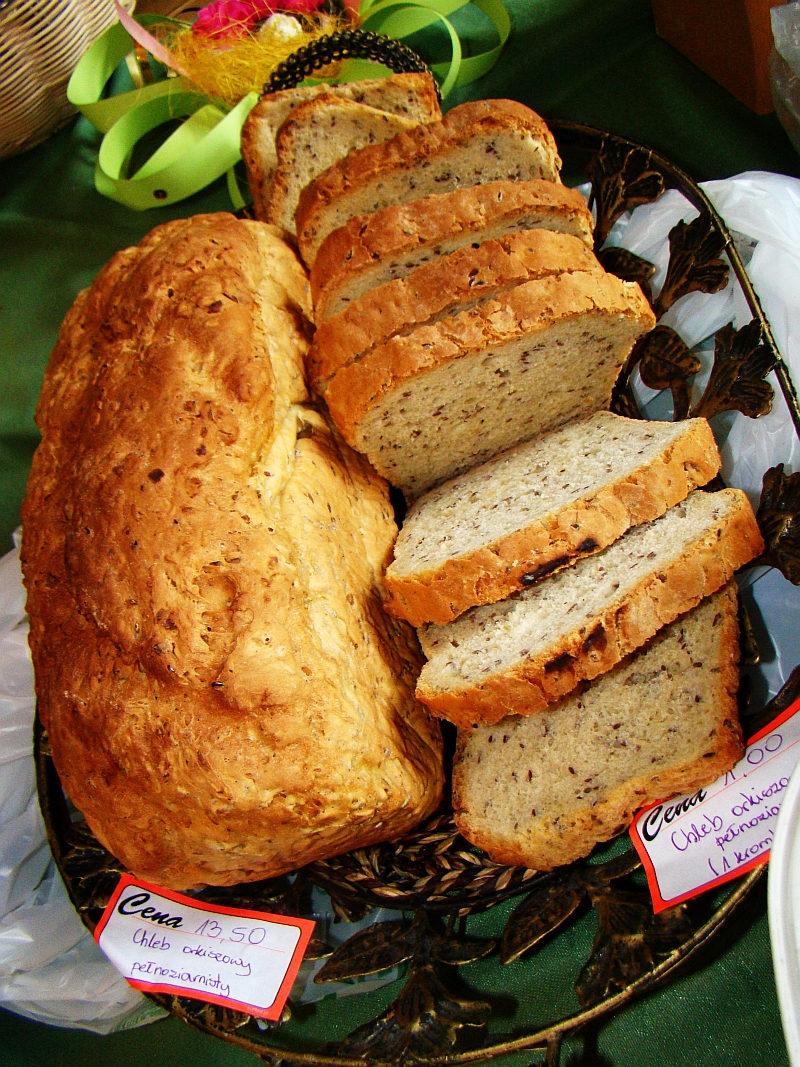
Wholegrain spelt bread from Poland

== See also ==
- Khorasan wheat
- Sorghum
