= Grünkern =

Spelt harvested when half ripe

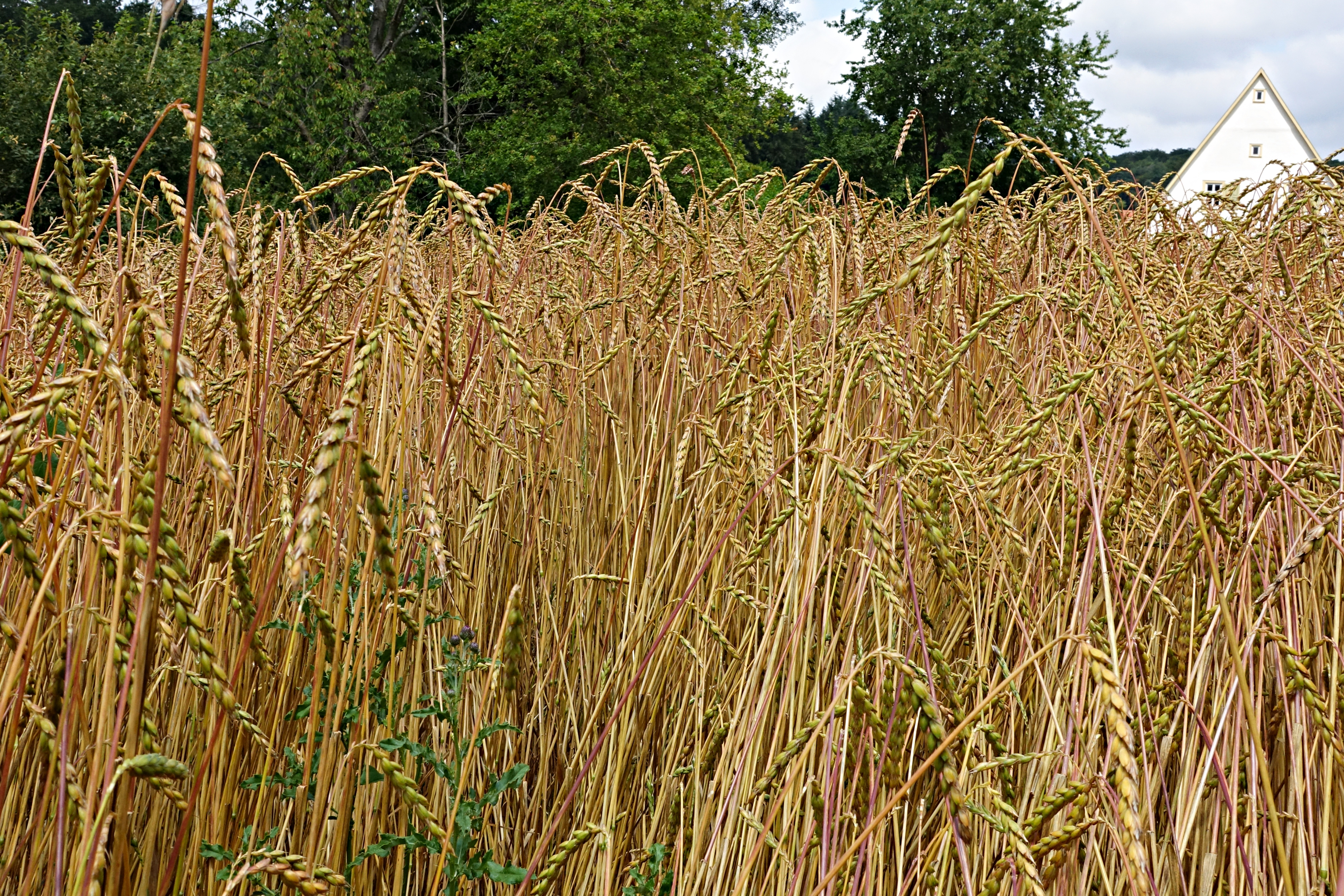
Spelt, from which Grünkern is produced

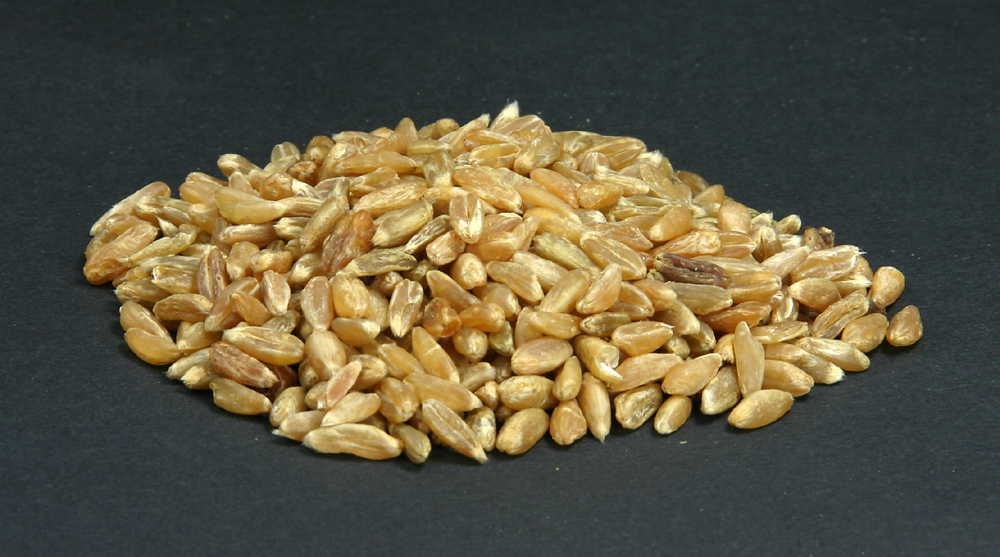
Grünkern, husked

Grünkern (German pronunciation: [ˈɡʁyːnkɛʁn], 'green kernel') is spelt that has been harvested when half ripe and then artificially dried. Grünkern is traditionally produced in the Bauland region in the north-east of Baden-Württemberg (Germany). In response to periods of adverse weather, which destroyed crops, spelt was harvested before it was completely ripe, during the so-called 'dough-ripe phase', at about 50% moisture content. Because the dried kernels exhibited a pleasing flavor when cooked in water, it became traditional to harvest a portion of the spelt crop as Grünkern.

As a winter crop, the spelt meant for Grünkern would be harvested at the end of July and subsequently dehydrated, traditionally over a beechwood fire, or in modern times, in heated-air ovens. This preserves the Grünkern (by reducing moisture content to 13%) and endows it with its typical taste and aroma. Before further processing, Grünkern must be husked or milled. Grünkern husk has been used as a cattle feed, or as the filler for small pillows which are meant to promote healthy sleep.

The first attested use of Grünkern was in southern Germany, (Amorbach), in 1660. Grünkern was added to soups, and was dried by using the residual heat of bakehouses.

The primary harvesting period at the end of July is also seen in old folk proverbs, such as:

Christine, Jagowi, Sankt Anne is Ern! / Schneid't mer kee Korn, / so schneid't mer doch Keern.

Christine, James, Saint Anne means harvest time! / If we don't reap wheat, / we reap Grünkern.

== See also ==
- Freekeh, prepared from green wheat by drying and burning
