= Freekeh =

Cereal food made from green durum wheat

Freekah
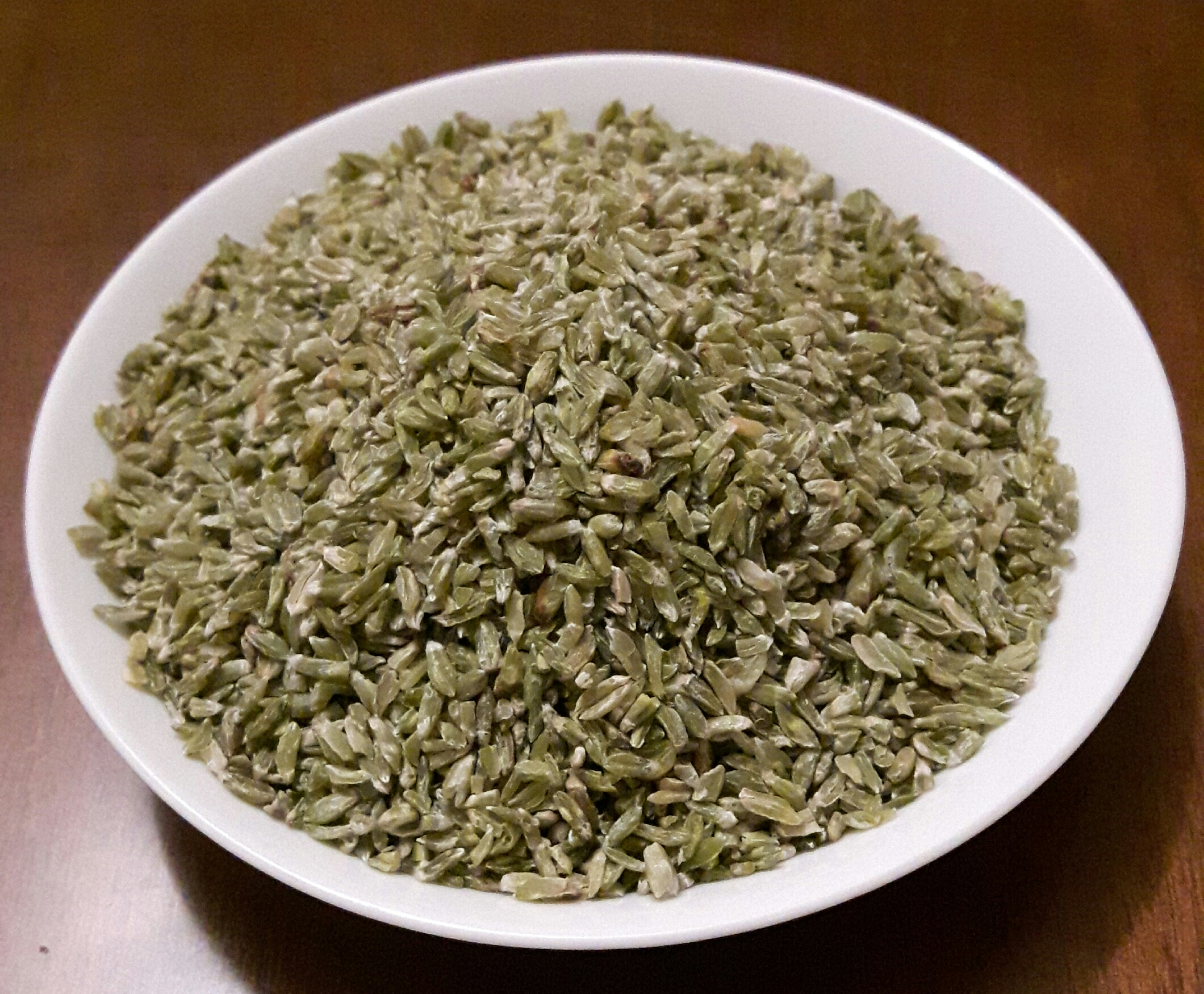
- Uncooked freekeh
- Alternative names: bowl of dry green grains
- Course: Main
- Place of origin: Levant
- Main ingredients: Green durum wheat

Freekeh (sometimes spelled frikeh) or farik (Arabic: فريكة / ALA-LC: farīkah; pronounced free-kah /ˈfɹiːkə/) is a cereal food made from green durum wheat (Triticum turgidum var. durum) that is roasted and rubbed to create its flavour. It is an ancient dish derived from Levantine and North African cuisines, remaining popular in many countries of the eastern Mediterranean Basin, where wheat was first domesticated.

Freekeh is the name for the wheat grain prepared in a specific way. Harvested while still green and the seeds still soft, it is piled and sun-dried, and then carefully set alight such that only the straw and chaff burn, with the grain protected by its high water content. This roasted wheat is then threshed, winnowed and sun-dried again to achieve a uniform flavour, texture, and colour, and make it suitable for long-term storage. The threshing or rubbing of the burnt chaff off of the grains is what gives this food its name, from the Arabic word farīk or "rubbed". The dried berries can also be cracked into smaller pieces that resemble green bulgur.

== History ==
Traces of wild wheat berries of the emmer variety used to make bread were found in a hearth at a Natufian site in the Levant, and dated to 14,000 years ago. The variety of wheat used to make freekeh, Triticum turgidum was domesticated around 10,000 years ago in the same general region. A subspecies of this durum wheat is grown globally today, primarily to make semolina for pasta, as it is a hard grain, less suited to producing fine flour; and this is the same grain used to make freekeh.

Qalûy (Biblical Hebrew: קָל֤וּי, scorched or roasted) and carmel (Biblical Hebrew: כַּרְמֶל), are terms identified by Hebrew Bible scholars as references to the Arabic word freekeh. In the Book of Kings II, for instance, it is said that Elisha miraculously fed about a hundred people with some barley bread and carmel. Syriac versions of the Bible also translate carmel as froka, a cognate of the Arabic freekeh. While scriptural references have been cited as evidence that freekeh was a part of ancient Israelite cuisine, freekeh was largely unknown in modern Israeli cuisine until recently, and is traditionally farmed by Palestinians and Arabs, constituting a main staple in their cuisines.

The term freekeh is derived from the Arabic verb, farik, meaning "to rub", nodding towards the process by which it is produced, which involves rubbing the chaff off of the burnt wheat berries against a winnowing tray, known in Arabic as the ghorbal/ghurbal. It is a labor intensive process, as due to the immaturity of the grain at the time of picking, the chaff does not easily separate from the berry, and a second rubbing against coiled flat baskets made from the previous years' harvest is also undertaken.

Freekeh is mentioned in an early thirteenth-century Baghdad cookbook as farīkiyya. In that recipe, meat is fried in oil and braised with water, salt, and cinnamon bark. Then, dried coriander is stirred in with young wheat ("freekeh") and is cooked. Finally, the meal is served with cumin, cinnamon, and fresh lamb tail fat. This is a luxurious recipe with such cookbooks generally written to prepare dishes for the wealthy and royalty, whereas freekeh was most commonly consumed as a staple of the common people.

In his 1865 book The Land of Israel: A Journal of Travels in Palestine, British clergyman and scholar Henry Baker Tristram documented the preparation of freekeh near the Sea of Galilee:

Many fires were lighted on the shingle by the shores of the lake, fed by the clumps of papyrus roots torn up and washed ashore; and groups of Arabs who had laid aside their sickles, for the evening sun was setting, were clustered around them. We watched with interest the preparation of their evening meal. A few sheaves of wheat had been brought down from the fields above; these were tossed on the fire, and as soon as the straw was consumed, the charred heads were dexterously swept from the embers onto a cloak spread on the ground. The women of the party then beat the ears and tossed them into the air until they were thoroughly winnowed, when the wheat was eaten without further preparation ... the green ears had become half-charred by the roasting, and there was a pleasant mingling of milky wheat and a fresh crust flavour, as we chewed the parched corn. We were delighted to have seen the preparation, and to have partaken parched corn, so often mentioned in the Old Testament Scriptures.

Freekeh is harvested in Palestine in the late spring, sometimes early summer, when the wheat berries of durum are still green, and just before they become golden and dry, during a phase in their growth that only lasts about one to weeks. Wheat has long been a staple of fellahin and bedouin diets, along with wild foraged greens, with the consumption of meat generally reserved only for special occasions. It is not clear when or how the practice of producing freekeh began exactly, though local lore provides various explanations. One theory attributes it to accidental discovery following the burning of a village's wheat storage silos; another to a deliberate practice to harvest part of the wheat crop early, to have some insurance against drought or locusts spoiling the crop.

The texture of freekeh in cooking varies; if consumed immediately after roasting when they still retain some of their water content, there is a unique chewiness in the grains, absent from those left to dry out further for storage.

== Culinary ==
In Egyptian cuisine, freekeh is served as ḥamām bi’l-ferīk, which is pigeon stuffed with freekeh (ducks are also used). Freekeh is also prepared in Egypt with onion and tomato, and sometimes with chicken. Shūrbat farīk bi’l-mukh is a freekeh and bone marrow soup from Tunisia. Freeket lahma, a green wheat pilaf dish with roasted lamb, spring peas, and pine nuts, comes from Jordan, and shūrba al-farīk is a soup with green wheat and chicken. Chicken stuffed with freekeh is a traditional dish found in several Arab countries.

In Syria, freekeh usually is prepared with lamb, onion, butter, almonds, black pepper, cinnamon, cumin, and salt.

In Tunisia and Algeria, freekeh is usually prepared as a main ingredient in a tomato-based soup called Chorba frik and is considered a traditional food.

In Turkey, freekeh is known as firik, and a pilaf dish based on freekeh, called firik pilavı, is found in traditional Southern Anatolian cuisine. It may be combined with bulgur; legumes such as chickpeas and various herbs and spices, and sometimes meat, may be added. With the influx of millions of Syrian refugees since 2011, firik is available in markets all over Turkey.

In Palestine, a variety of freekeh pilaf is made with lamb, onion, olive oil, raisins, dried cherry plums, almonds, pine nuts, black pepper, cinnamon, cumin, and salt. Freekeh is also served in a soup along with chickpeas and meat (beef or chicken). In the Galilee region, freekeh and other wheats are a staple, especially among Druze and Bedouins, as opposed to rice.

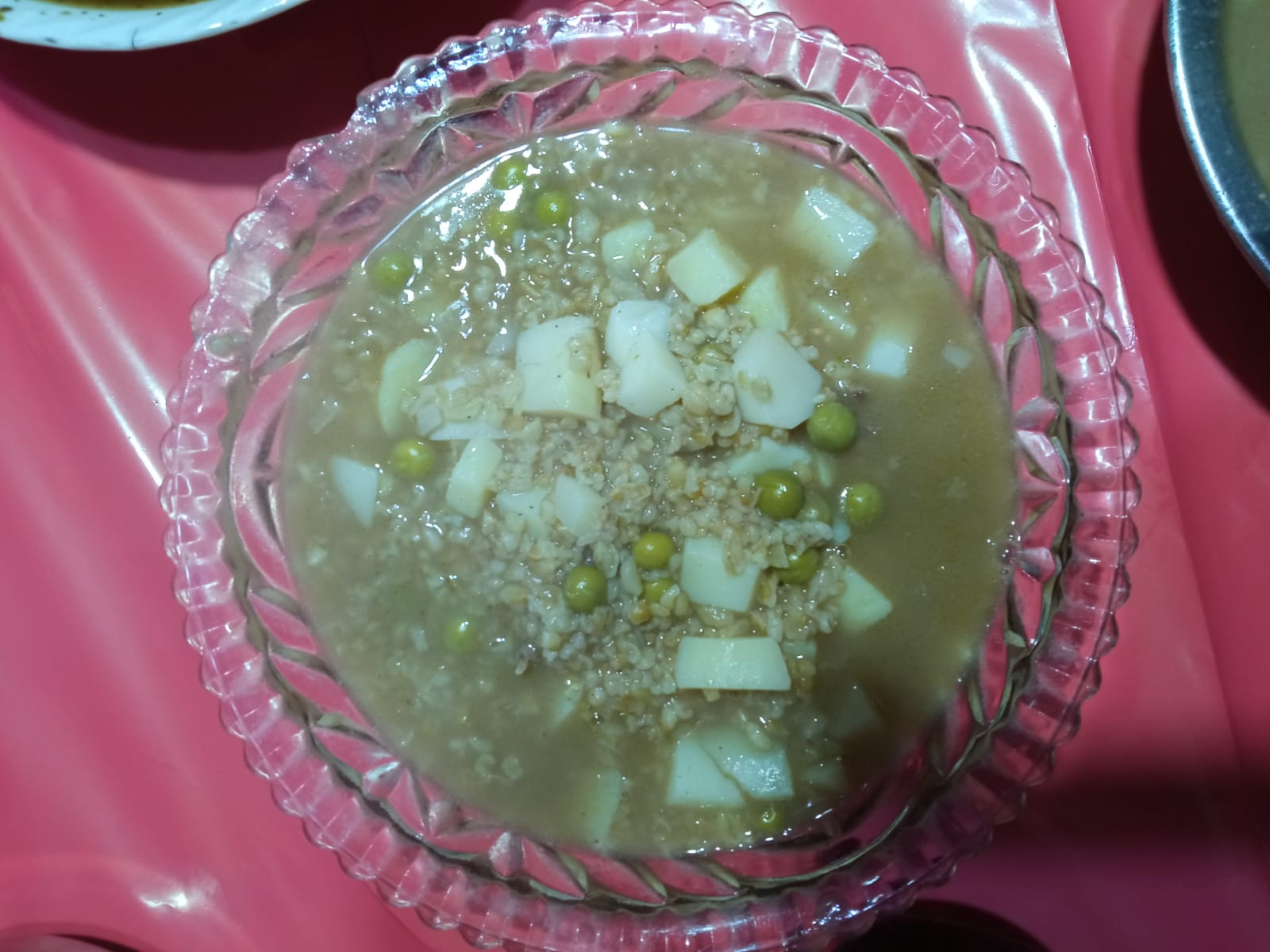
Freekeh soup from Palestine

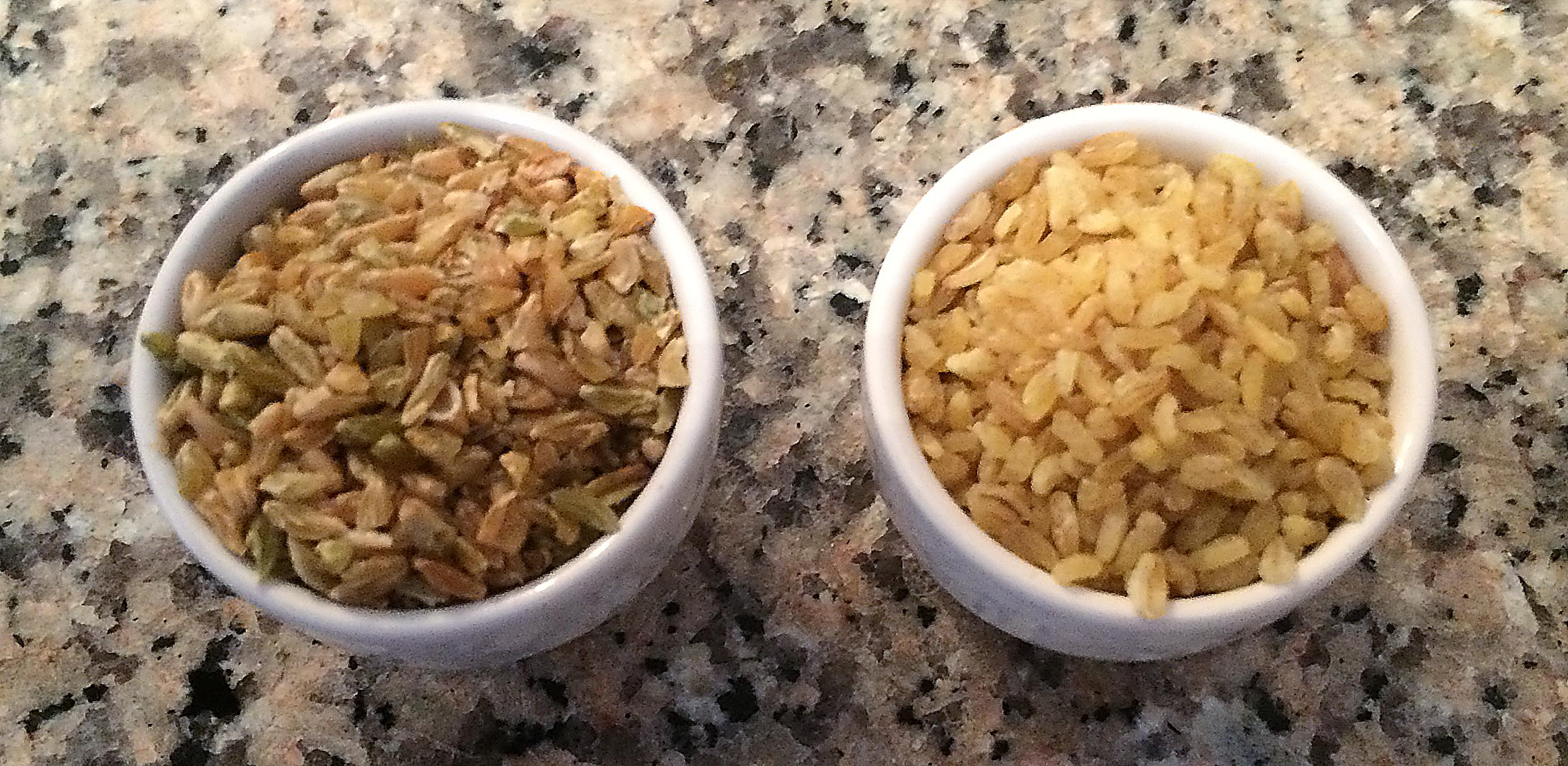
Turkish firik (left) and bulgur (right) before cooking

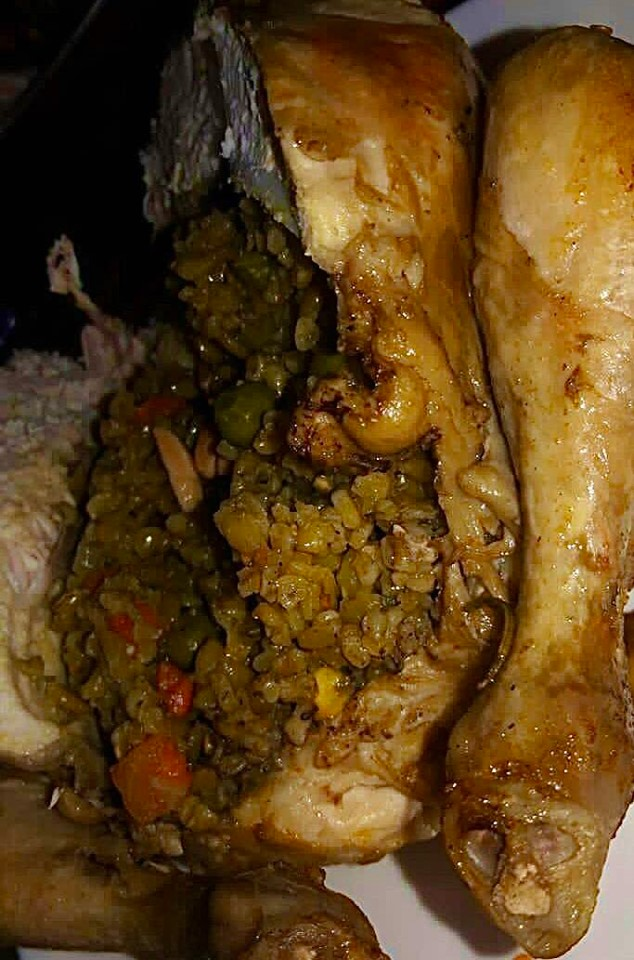
Chicken stuffed with freekeh from the Levant

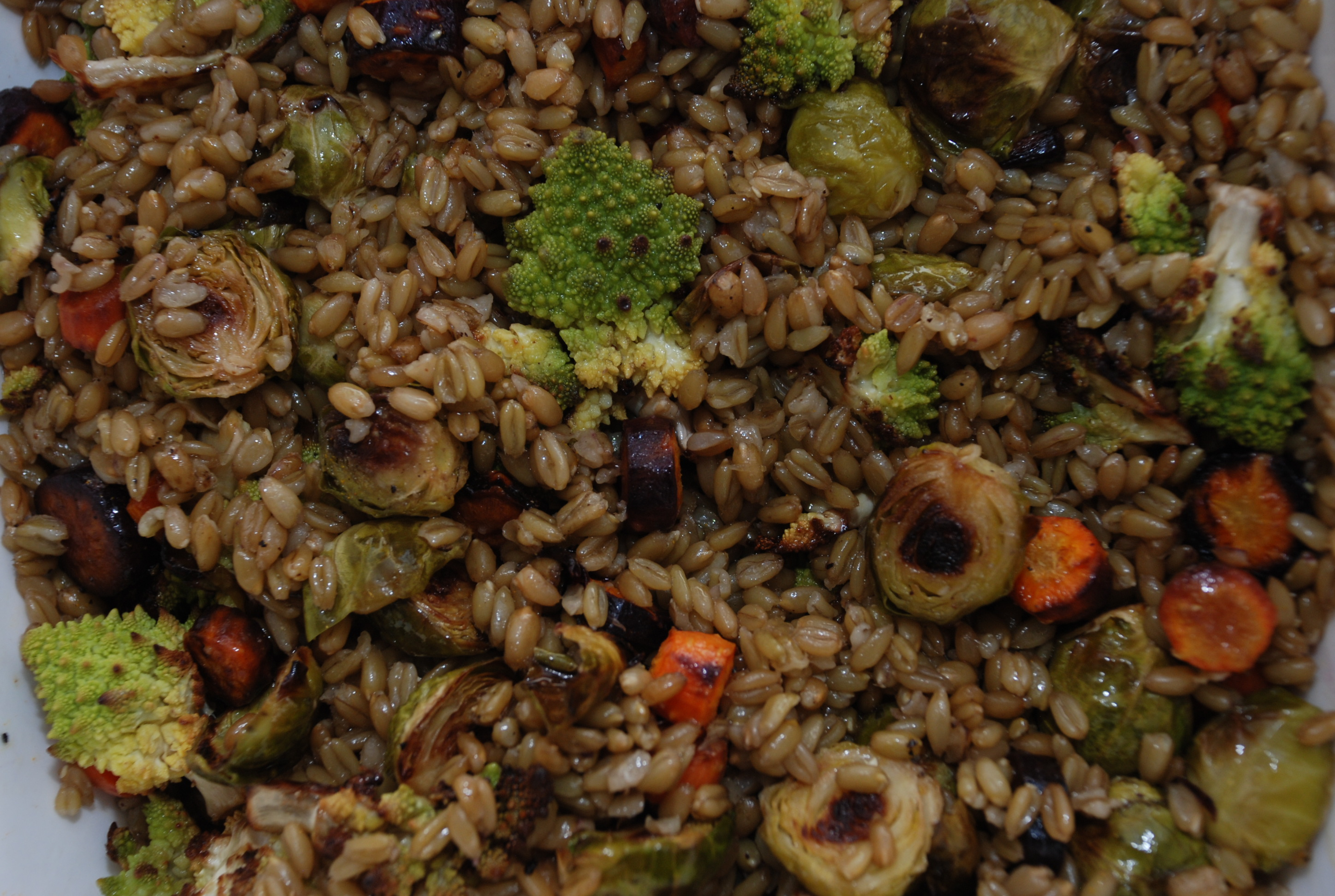
Freekeh with roasted vegetables

== Nutritional value ==
Freekeh (green durum wheat)
Nutritional value per 100 g (3.5 oz)
- Energy: 1,418 kJ (339 kcal)
- Carbohydrates: 71 g
- Fat: 2.5 g
- Protein: 14 g
Vitamins and minerals
Vitamins	Quantity %DV^{†}
Thiamine (B1)	35% 0.42 mg
Riboflavin (B2)	9% 0.12 mg
Niacin (B3)	42% 6.7 mg
Pantothenic acid (B5)	19% 0.94 mg
Vitamin B6	25% 0.42 mg
Folate (B9)	11% 43 μg
Minerals	Quantity %DV^{†}
Calcium	3% 34 mg
Iron	19% 3.5 mg
Magnesium	34% 144 mg
Manganese	130% 3.0 mg
Phosphorus	41% 508 mg
Potassium	14% 431 mg
Sodium	0% 2 mg
Zinc	38% 4.2 mg
- Other constituents: Quantity
- selenium: 89 ug
- water: 11 g
- Link to Full USDA Database
- ^{†}Percentages estimated using US recommendations for adults, except for potassium, which is estimated based on expert recommendation from the National Academies.

Freekeh is comparable in nutritional content to other cereal grains, especially durum wheat, from which it is derived, depending on the durum cultivar. Durum is notable for its high content of protein (20% or more of the Daily Value, DV), dietary fiber, B vitamins, and several dietary minerals, especially manganese (143% DV) (table). Before roasting, freekeh is 11% water, 71% carbohydrates, 2.5% fat, and 14% protein.

== See also ==
- Grünkern, a similar preparation made from spelt
- List of African dishes
- List of Middle Eastern dishes
