= Kirnau =

River in Germany

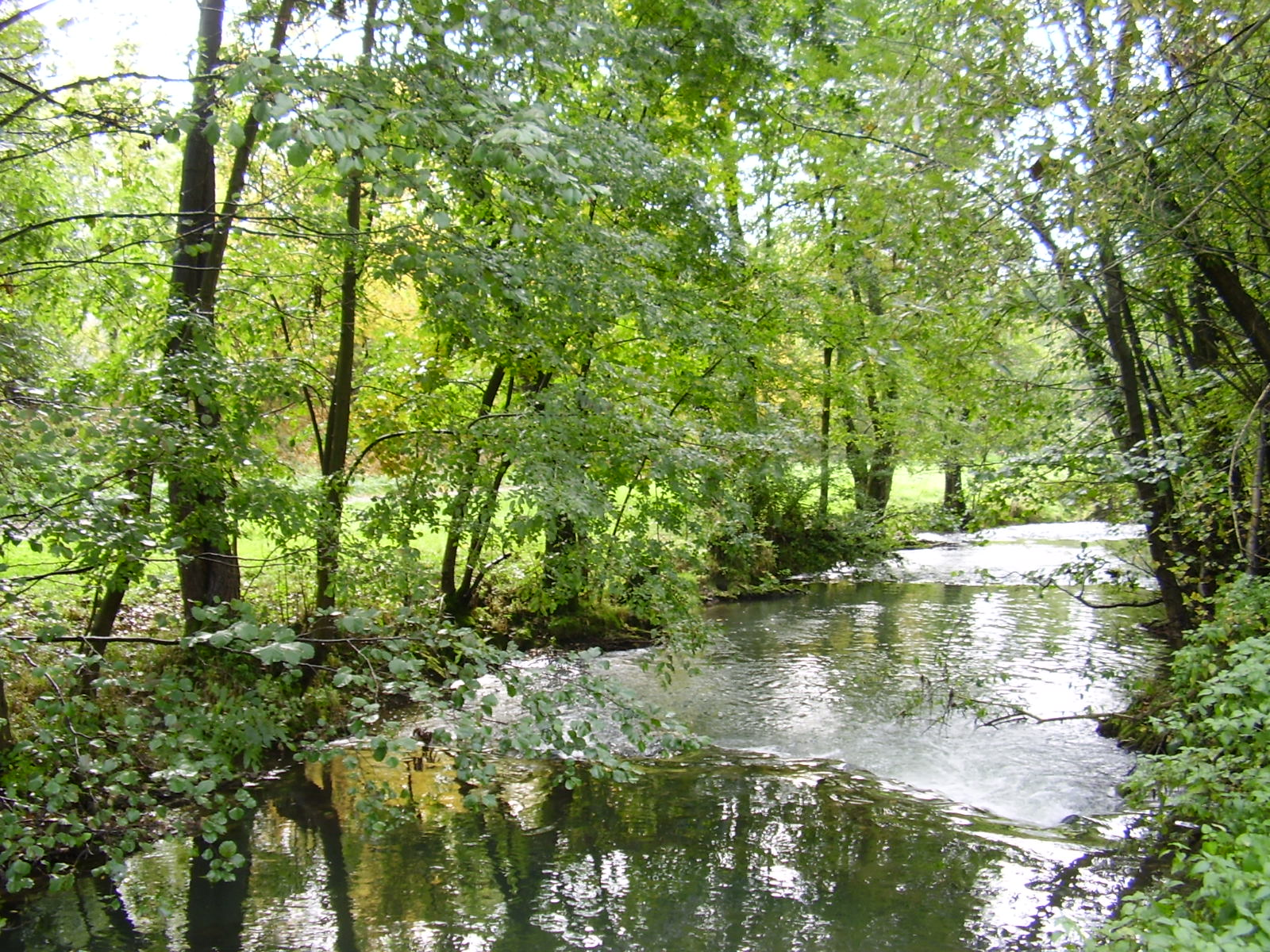

Location
- Country: Germany
- State: Baden-Württemberg

Physical characteristics
- Mouth
  - location: Seckach
  - coordinates: 49.4016°N 9.3903°E
- Length: 23.8 km (14.8 mi)

Basin features
- Progression: Seckach→ Jagst→ Neckar→ Rhine→ North Sea

Kirnau is a river in Baden-Württemberg, Germany. It passes through the town of Osterburken and flows into the Seckach in Adelsheim.

== See also ==
- List of rivers of Baden-Württemberg
