= Adelsheim =

- Town
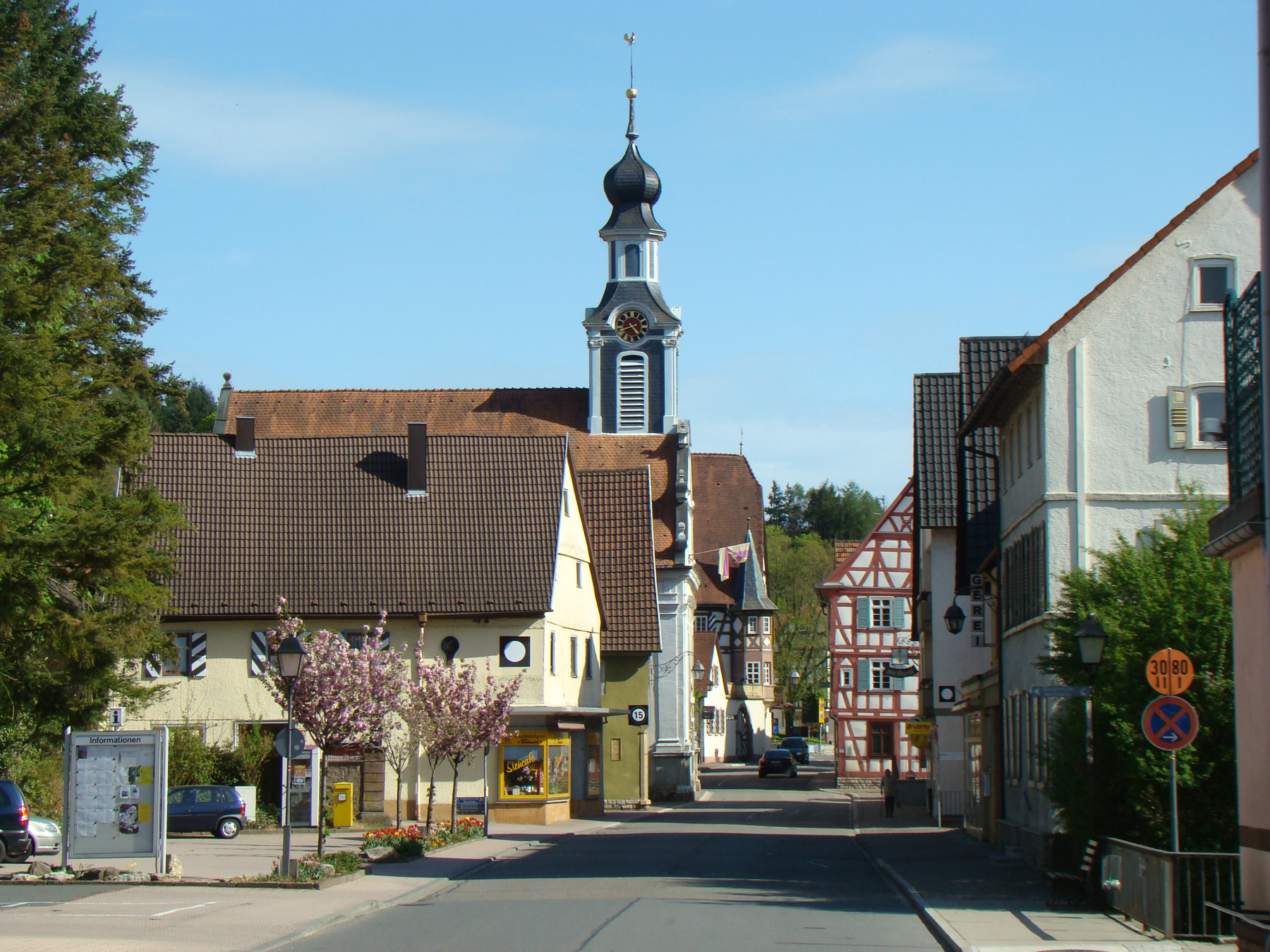
- Main street in Adelsheim

- Coat of arms

- Location of Adelsheim within Neckar-Odenwald-Kreis district
- Interactive map of Adelsheim
- Location within Germany Location within Baden-Württemberg
- Coordinates: 49°24′17″N 09°23′21″E
- Country: Germany
- State: Baden-Württemberg
- Admin. region: Karlsruhe
- District: Neckar-Odenwald-Kreis

Government
  - Mayor (2019–27): Wolfram Bernhardt

Area
  - Total: 43.84 km^{2} (16.93 sq mi)
- Elevation: 226 m (741 ft)

Population (2025-12-31)
  - Total: 5,112
  - Density: 116.6/km^{2} (302.0/sq mi)
- Time zone: UTC+01:00 (CET)
  - Summer (DST): UTC+02:00 (CEST)
- Postal codes: 74740
- Dialling codes: 06291
- Vehicle registration: MOS, BCH
- Website: www.adelsheim.de

Adelsheim (German pronunciation: [ˈaːdl̩sˌhaɪm]; South Franconian: Alleze) is a town in northern Baden-Württemberg, about 30 km north of Heilbronn. The state-recognized resort of Adelsheim in the Neckar-Odenwald-Kreis looks back on a 1,200-year heritage.

== Geography ==
Adelsheim lies at the mouth of the river Kirnau which comes from the west, emptying into the river Seckach coming from the north. The combined stream was used in building the town fortifications. Farther downstream, the Seckach flows by Möckmühl into the Jagst, thence into the Neckar, and thence into the Rhine.

The Adelsheim area is part of the greater geographical region known as the Bauland, a mountain range stretching from the Odenwald in the northwest to the Jagst valley in the south as well as to the Tauber valley in the east. Part of the municipality's area lies within the Neckartal-Odenwald Nature Park.

=== Communities within the town ===
==== Sennfeld (Baden) ====
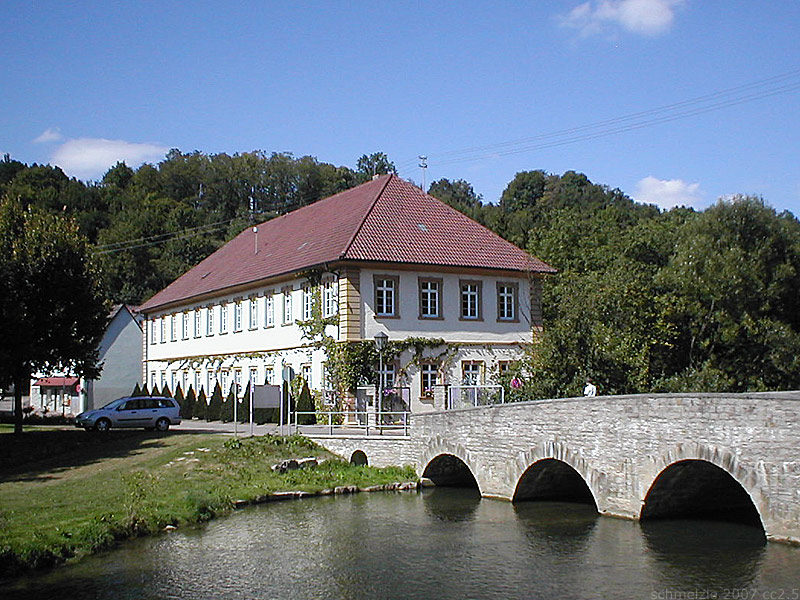
Schloss Sennfeld

Sennfeld lies about 3 km southwest along the Seckach valley and has about 1,250 inhabitants. The place was first mentioned in a document in 1110. In 1615, Margaretha von Carben, who was Götz von Berlichingen's granddaughter, endowed the Evangelical parish church. The Sennfeld Schloss (stately home), formerly owned by kin of the Barons of Berlichingen, was built in 1713 in a countrified Baroque style.

==== Leibenstadt ====
Leibenstadt, a former knightly village with about 320 inhabitants lying south of Adelsheim was first mentioned in a document in 1293, and has been part of Adelsheim since 1971. Website: http://www.leibenstadt.de

==== Wemmershof ====
The hamlet of Wemmershof, lying 3 km west of Adelsheim, saw the beginning of its village history in 1423. In the Middle Ages, the landlords relinquished the property to the farmers who lived there at the time. Today Wemmershof is now, as then, a community shaped by agriculture, and it has about 50 inhabitants.

==== Hergenstadt ====
Hergenstadt lies to the southeast. It is a hamlet with about 50 people, founded in 1500.

==== Adelsheim Business Park ====
The Adelsheim Business Park (called Business-Park Adelsheim in German) is located 1 km to the west, outside the Adelsheim municipal centre and 8 km from Autobahn A81, right on Federal Highway B 292. The B 292 connects the towns of Adelsheim and Schefflenz and leads to Osterburken.

== History ==
In 1374, Charles IV, Holy Roman Emperor raised Adelsheim to town. The landlords were the Imperial Knights (Reichsritter) of Adelsheim. The Reichsritters von Adelsheim were eventually elevated to the rank of Freiherr (Barons of the Holy Roman Empire).

Adelsheim was already home to some Jews in the Middle Ages. In 1338, Louis IV, Holy Roman Emperor had allowed the brothers Poppo and Berlinger von Adelsheim to "keep" four Jewish families in their lands. Also in 1690, there were four Jewish families resident in Adelsheim. The establishment of an actual community can be traced back to the seventeenth century. The highest number of Jewish inhabitants was reached in 1885 when the count was 70. Under an ordinance from 1690, the Jewish community yearly had to pay the Barons of Adelsheim four gulden for "school", that is to say, to be allowed to hold their religious services. The prayer room used at that time, according to oral tradition, was set up on the second floor of the house built by Melchior Keller in 1418 in the Torgasse ("Gate Lane"). This house was dismantled in 1952. Later, there was a prayer room in a likewise no longer standing building in the yard of the Oberschloss.

From the middle of the nineteenth century until 1889, a synagogue stood at Turmgasse 27.

A ritual bath and a Jewish school were housed at the old synagogue in the nineteenth century at Turmgasse 27, and as of 1889 at the new synagogue (Untere Austraße 1). When the new synagogue was being torn down in 1977, the ritual bath was rediscovered. Burials were performed in Buchen-Bödigheim and after 1884 in Sennfeld.

After the deportations during the Third Reich, at least ten of the 35 Jews living in town in 1933 lost their lives.

As a result of the Reformation, the people became Lutheran. Until 2000, Adelsheim was the seat of a deaconate of the Baden State Church, part of the Evangelical Church in Germany. In the course of deaconate reform, the deaconate moved to Hirschlanden in Rosenberg.

Catholics are a minority. After 1945 a rough balance between the two faiths was reached through the arrival of refugees from the east. After 1960, a further Catholic church was established, St. Mary's.

- The forerunner to the folk festival (Volksfest) was the Homeland Days (Heimattage) in 1948. The occasion for Adelsheim's second folk festival in 1949 was the celebration of the dedication of the new Kirnau Bridge, which replaced one destroyed in 1945.
- On 11 November 1948, the Adelsheim District Agricultural School (Kreislandwirtschaftschule Adelsheim) opened its doors under Dr. Leopold Wiswesser's leadership. In the years that were to come, Adelsheim's history was shaped by its schools: the Volksschule moved onto the Eckenberg in 1958, and farther into the forest a few years later, the Gymnasium with its boarding school was established.

== Politics ==
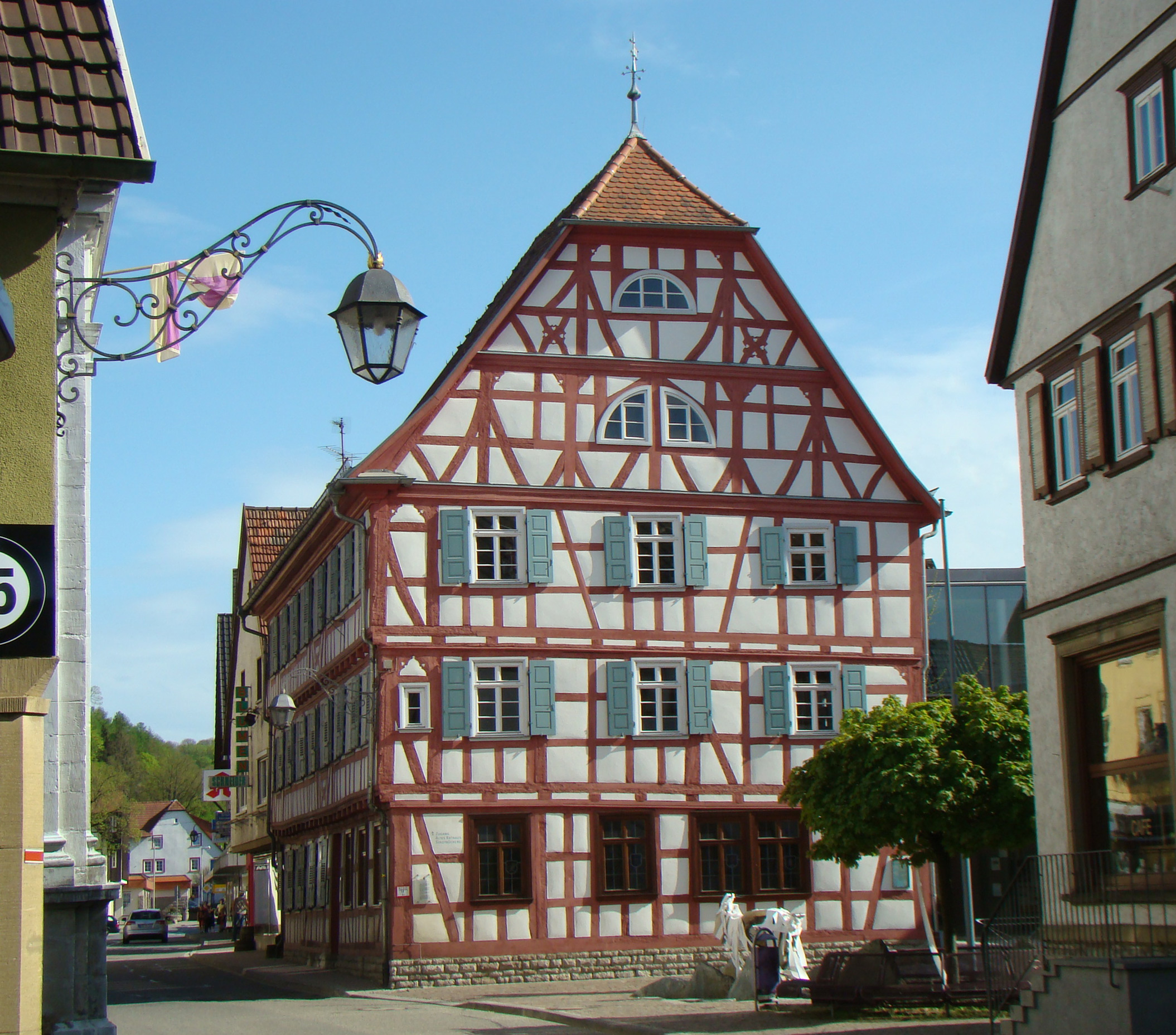
Rathaus

Mayors (Bürgermeister)

- Wolfram Walafried Bernhardt
- Klaus Gramlich
- Walter Muth
- Peter Hütt
- Günter Bauer
- Friedrich Gerner

Municipal council (after 2004 municipal election):

- CDU 8 seats
- SPD 6 seats
- FWV (citizens' coalition) 3 seats
- BLA 3 seats

=== Coat of arms and flag ===
The coat of arms, which might be described as "Argent an alpine ibex's horn sable", was bestowed upon the town by Kaiser Sigismund in 1422. Adelsheim's town colours are black and white. The town colours are to be seen at the Schildmännchen – an emblem depicting a little man behind an heraldic shield – near the centre of town at the Oberschloss-Erker (stately home).

== Economy and infrastructure ==
=== Transport ===
Adelsheim lies on the Frankenbahn railway (Adelsheim Ost or Sennfeld station) and the Neckartalbahn railway, and thereby also on the S-Bahn RheinNeckar (Adelsheim Nord station). Since December 2003 both hourly trains on S-Bahn line S1 (Kaiserslautern - Mannheim - Osterburken) and RegionalExpress trains every two hours (Mannheim - Eberbach - Heilbronn) run on this line. Goods trains run mainly evenings or nights. While line S2 ends in Eberbach, or every two hours in Mosbach-Neckarelz, S1 goes hourly through to Osterburken, giving Adelsheim optimal integration into the Frankenbahn (Stuttgart-Würzburg) timetable.

The town has a connection with Autobahn A 81 (Stuttgart - Würzburg) through an interchange lying only 8 km from the centre of town. Federal Highway B 292 also runs through Adelsheim (Sinsheim - Mosbach - Adelsheim - Osterburken - Lauda-Königshofen).

=== Court and institutions ===
Adelsheim, owing to the large nearby youth penal institution, still has at its disposal a small local court, which belongs to the state court region of Mosbach and the higher state court region of Karlsruhe.

=== Educational institutions ===
- Evangelical and Catholic kindergartens
- Primary school and Hauptschule with Werkrealschule
- Eckenberg-Gymnasium with boarding school and the State School Centre for Environmental Education
- Volkshochschule Adelsheim

=== Leisure ===
- Heated swimming pool, opening times: May–September 9–20 h
- Miniature golf
- Jugendhaus Adelsheim (youth centre), opening times: Thu-Sat 19-22:30 h (beyond the weekly opening times the centre also regularly organizes live band performances involving all kinds of musical styles, and various themed parties)
- Live-Factory

== Culture and sightseeing ==
- Gothic (old) Jakobskirche (church), built 1489 with many tombs on the inner and outer walls; great plague grave.
- Ober- and Unterschloss (stately homes)
- Town hall with fine half-timbering, 1619, completed and preserved by new building in contemporary style (about 1990).
- Evangelical town church, late Baroque.
- reconstructed town tower.
- Town garden with waterfall lit at night.
- Former synagogue in Sennfeld, built 1836.
- Old mill
- Bauländer Heimatmuseum Adelsheim – open May–September Sundays 14-16 h or by telephoning to make arrangements.
- For railway enthusiasts: Ostbahnhof (station) with outlying buildings, Nordbahnhof in late Gothic style with two waiting rooms.
- "Lookout Bench" at Alt-Stadtrat Schmitt (especially for lovers).
- Grand-Ducal Local Court with adjoining prison.
- Jugendhaus Adelsheim, inaugurated about 1969, earlier housed on a nineteenth-century estate, now in a renovated railway station building.
- Youth prison (block or box design from the early 1970s with distinctive "town wall"), built in a side valley off the Seckach valley.
- Kirnau valley with remains of the Grand-Ducal irrigation works for ambitious agricultural projects.
- Transmission tower at 49° 24' 38" N, 9° 23' 29" E (freestanding steel lattice construction, bearing until 1993 an SWR MW transmission antenna in the form of a long-wire antenna)

=== Clubs ===
Adelsheim: Since the war, there have been four clubs – a singing club, a sport club, a youth club, and the fire brigade – but a few others have come into being since then, although this traditional core is much the same as it always has been. Sennfeld: In Sennfeld many clubs were founded, or refounded, after the war. The clubs with the most members are the TV 1897 Sennfeld e.V. (athletic club with fistball, gymnastics), the SV Germania Adelsheim (sport club) and the VfB Sennfeld 1923 e.V. (football, table tennis, badminton). There are furthermore many smaller clubs catering to all interests. Leibenstadt: a sports club, SV Leibenstadt 1946 e.V. (http://www.sv-leibenstadt.de).

=== Regular events ===
- Fasenacht, a German carnival held in the leadup to Lent, with various events.
- Since 2005: "Adelsheim leuchtet" ("Adelsheim glows").
- The Volksfest (instituted after 1945) always on the first Sunday in July.
- The Sennfelder Dorffest (village festival held every three years in Sennfeld)
- The Adelsheimer Weihnachtsmarkt ("Christmas Market", held by various local clubs and coördinated by the Youth Centre)

== Personalities ==
=== People who were born in Adelsheim ===
- Maria Rigel, (born 1869 in Adelsheim, died 1937 in Ludwigshafen), politician, Member of Parliament
- Alex Lewin (born 1888 in Adelsheim, died 1942 in the extermination camp Auschwitz), the last chief rabbi of Oldenburg region's Birkenfeld

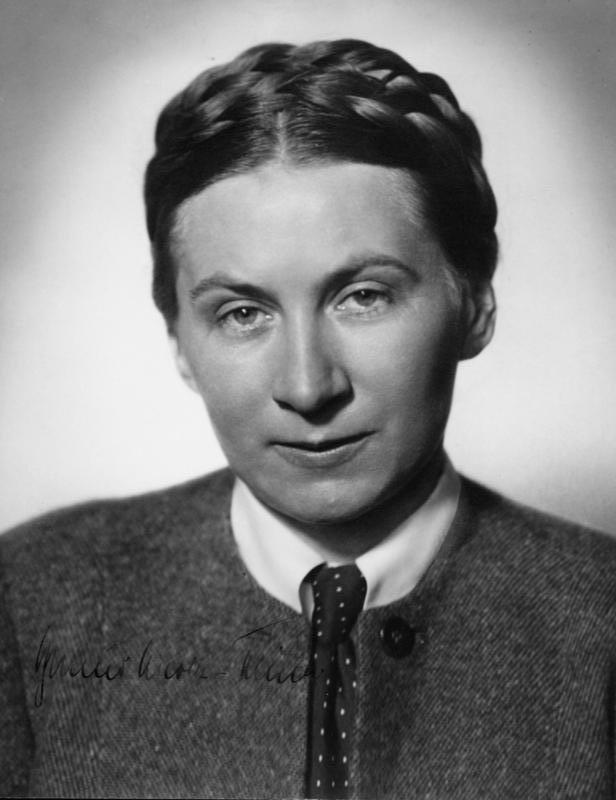
Gertrud Scholtz-Klink 1934

- Gertrud Scholtz-Klink (born 1902 in Adelsheim, resident there until 1904; died 1999 in Bebenhausen), NS woman leader from 1934

=== Personalities who have worked locally ===
- Rolf Rettich (born 1929 in Erfurt; died 2009 in Vordorf) Illustrator of children's books draftsman, cartoon and children's book author.
- Peter Hauk (born 1960 in Walldürn) MdL, Baden-Württemberg politician CDU, 2005-2010 Minister for Food and rural affairs Baden-Württemberg, since 2010 chairman of the CDU in the state parliament of Baden-Württemberg, since 2016 Minister for food and rural Affairs, lives in Adelsheim.
