= Seckach =

- Municipality
- Coat of arms

- Location of Seckach within Neckar-Odenwald-Kreis district
- Interactive map of Seckach
- Location within Germany Location within Baden-Württemberg
- Coordinates: 49°26′42″N 9°20′7″E
- Country: Germany
- State: Baden-Württemberg
- Admin. region: Karlsruhe
- District: Neckar-Odenwald-Kreis
- Subdivisions: 3

Government
  - Mayor (2018–26): Thomas Ludwig (FW)

Area
  - Total: 27.85 km^{2} (10.75 sq mi)
- Elevation: 300 m (980 ft)

Population (2025-12-31)
  - Total: 3,990
  - Density: 143/km^{2} (371/sq mi)
- Time zone: UTC+01:00 (CET)
  - Summer (DST): UTC+02:00 (CEST)
- Postal codes: 74743
- Dialling codes: 06292, 06291 (Zimmern), 06293 (Großeicholzheim)
- Vehicle registration: MOS, BCH
- Website: www.seckach.de

Seckach is a village and a municipality in the district of Neckar-Odenwald-Kreis, in Baden-Württemberg, Germany. The river Seckach passes through it.

== Twin towns ==
- Gazzada Schianno, Italy
