= Steinach (Neckarsteinach) =

River in Germany

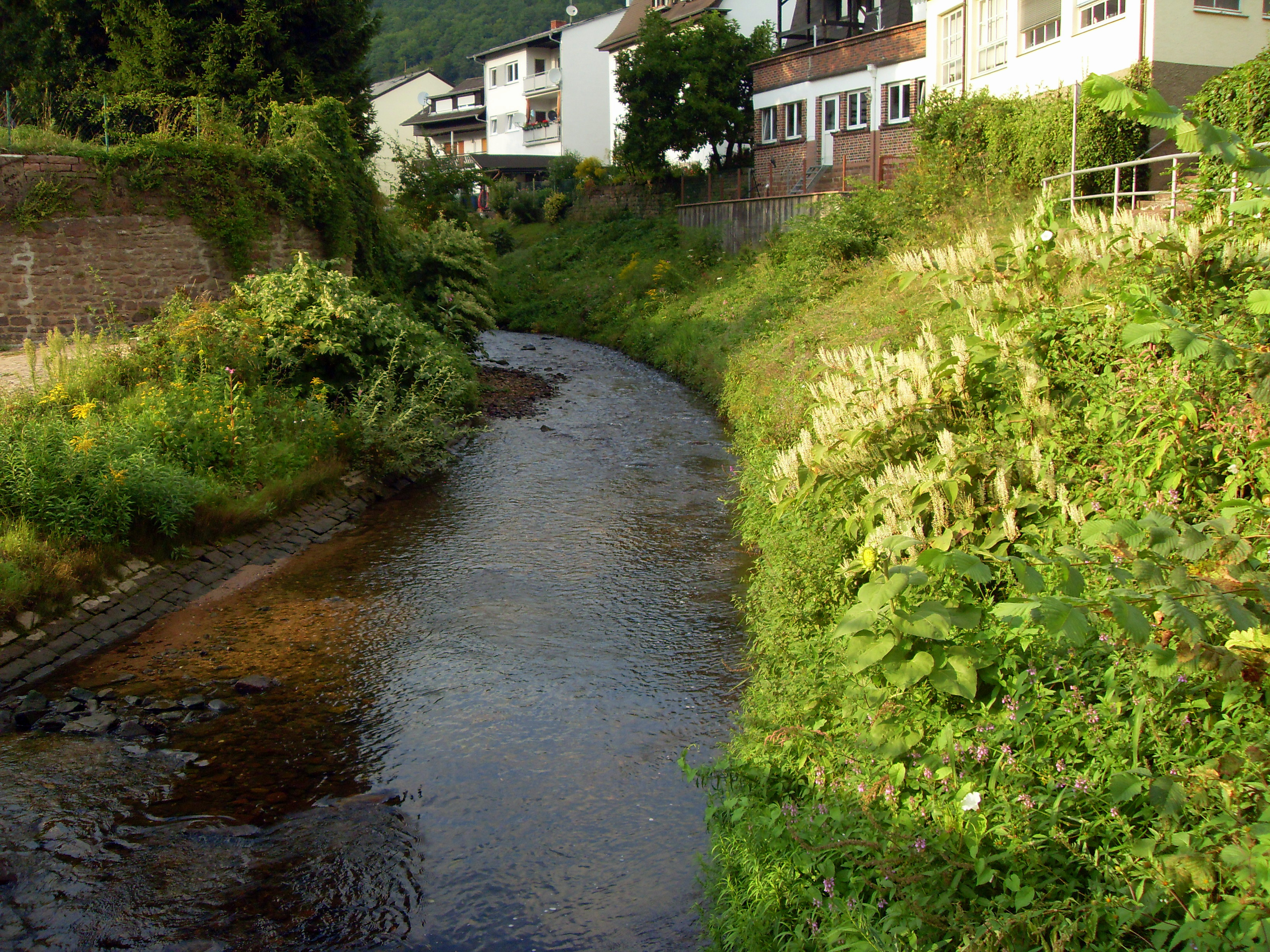

Location
- Country: Germany
- States: Hesse; Baden-Württemberg

Physical characteristics
- Mouth: Neckar
  - location: Neckarsteinach
  - coordinates: 49°24′21″N 8°50′21″E
- Length: 22.2 km (13.8 mi)

Basin features
- Progression: Neckar→ Rhine→ North Sea

Steinach (German pronunciation: [ˈʃtaɪnax]) is a river of Hesse and Baden-Württemberg, in the southwest of Germany. It passes through Abtsteinach, Heiligkreuzsteinach and Schönau and flows into the Neckar in Neckarsteinach.

== See also ==
- List of rivers of Baden-Württemberg
- List of rivers of Hesse
