= Arthur Hannequin =

- Born: October 27, 1856; Pargny-sur-Saulx
- Died: July 4, 1905 (aged 48)

Arthur Eduoard Hannequin (October 27, 1856 – July 4, 1905) was a French philosopher. He was a philosopher of science notable for Atomistic Intuitions.
