= Überwasserkirche =

- St. Marien Überwasser
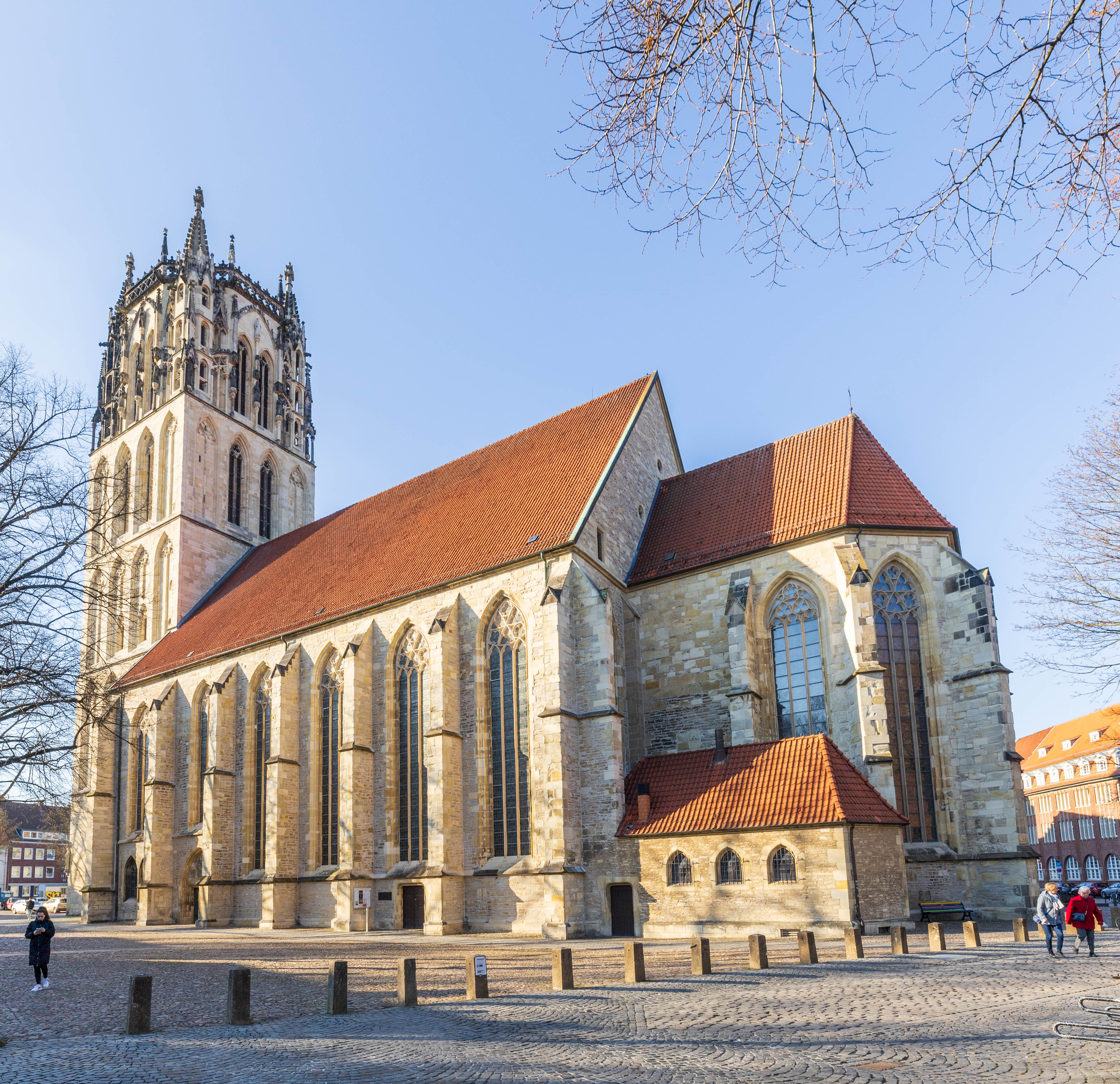
- Überwasserkirche
- 51°57′51″N 7°37′21″E
- Location: Münster, North Rhine-Westphalia, Germany
- Denomination: Catholic
- Website: www.liebfrauen-muenster.de

History
- Status: Monastery church (formerly); Parish church
- Dedication: Mary
- Consecrated: 1340

Architecture
- Style: Gothic hall church

Administration
- Diocese: Münster

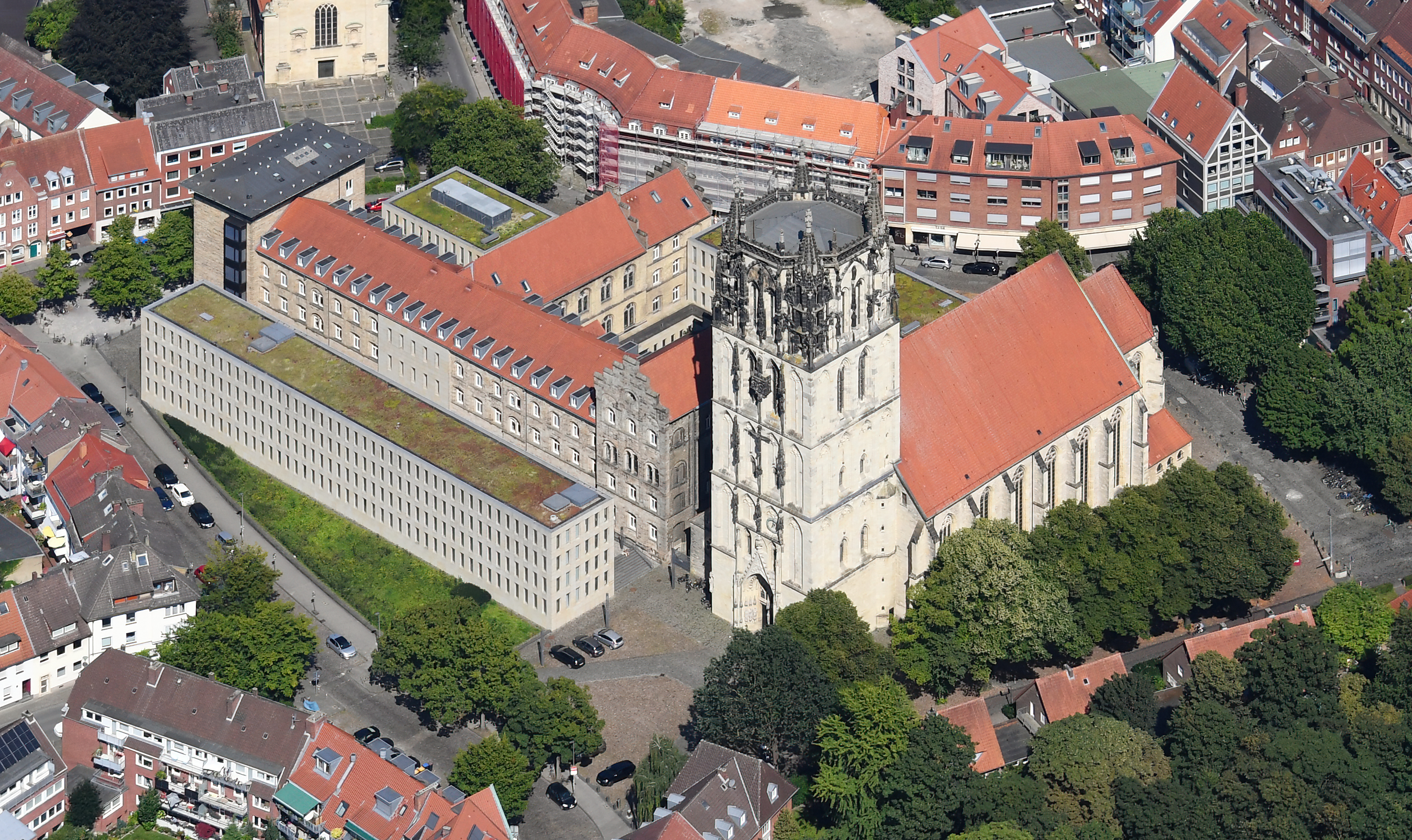
Aerial view of Überwasserkirche

Überwasserkirche (German pronunciation: [yːbɐˈvasɐˌkɪʁçə]) is the common name of a Gothic hall church in Münster, North Rhine-Westphalia, Germany. It is a Liebfrauenkirche (Church of Our Dear Lady), dedicated to St. Mary. Officially St. Marien Überwasser, it is also called Liebfrauen-Überwasser. The name literally means "church beyond the water" and describes the location as on the other side of the Aa river, looking from the Münster Cathedral. It was inaugurated as part of an educational Stift in 1040, which later became the University of Münster.

On 20 July 1941, Clemens August Graf von Galen delivered a famous sermon against the Nazi regime at the Überwasserkirche. The church was destroyed in World War II. It underwent a restoration that was completed in 1968 and another in 2016. It features two organs built in 1972 and 1985. It now serves as the parish church of a larger merged parish.

== History ==
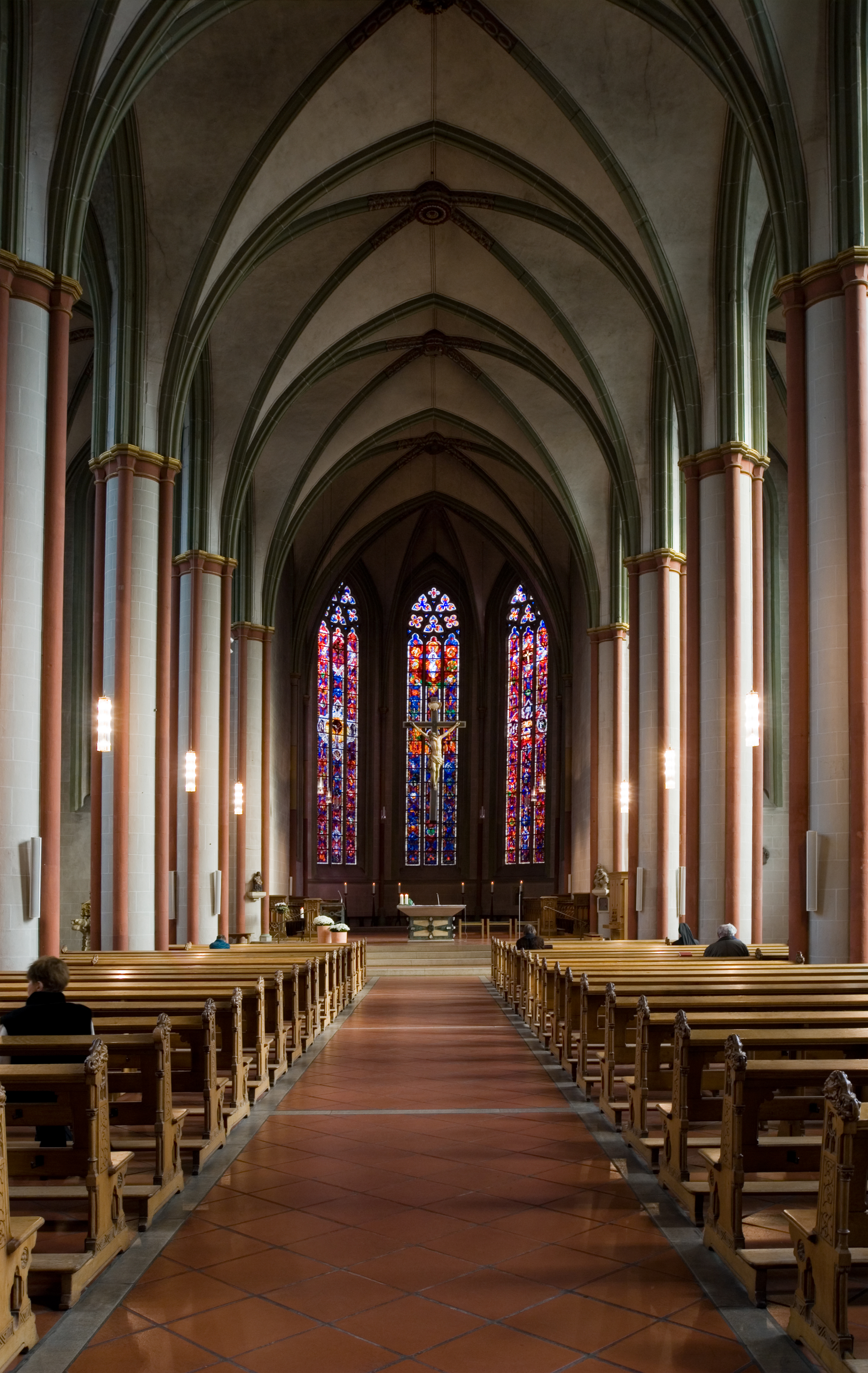
Interior

The first Überwasserkirche was dedicated on 29 December 1040, at Christmastide, to Mary, "ad Beatam Mariam Virginem sub Titulo Nativitatis" (to the Blessed Virgin Mary under the title of the nativity of Christ). The ceremony took place in the presence of King Heinrich III and several bishops. The church was part of a Stift for women founded by Bishop Hermann I of Münster which served the education of noble women. The church, which was also the parish church for the neighbourhood, burnt down in 1071. The exact date of a following building is not known, and it was damaged by fire in 1121 when Münster was attacked by Lothair III.

The present church, a hall church with three naves, was built from 1340. The steeple was built from 1363 to 1374. The steeple spire and also the baptismal font were destroyed during the Münster rebellion of Anabaptists in 1534/35. The steeple was restored, but again destroyed by a strong storm in 1704.

In 1773, the Stift was dissolved, and a seminary was founded which remained until 2005. It was the origin of the University of Münster, which still shows the "liebe Frau von Überwasser" in its seal. The church was the burial place of members of the Droste zu Hülshoff family and of the Baroque builder Johann Conrad Schlaun in 1773. The grave of Bernhard Heinrich Overberg, who was dean and pastor here, is located in the choir. Franz Friedrich Wilhelm von Furstenberg was buried at the Überwasserfriedhof; since 21 October 1929 his grave has been in the cemetery of the canons of St. Paul's Cathedral in Münster.

On 20 July 1941, Clemens August Graf von Galen, then bishop of Münster, delivered the second of his three famous sermons against the Nazi regime in the Überwasserkirche, titled "We are the anvil, not the hammer" ("Wir sind der Amboss, nicht der Hammer"). The church was badly damaged during bombings in World War II. Its restoration was completed in 1968, and it received a main organ in 1972. The windows were created by Valentin Peter Feuerstein. The church was closed for restoration again from 11 January 2016 until 11 November 2016.

Since 9 March 2014, the church has been the parish church of a merged parish, including St. Theresia (Sentruper Höhe), St. Sebastian (Nienberge) and St. Michael (Gievenbeck).

== Organs ==
The Überwasserkirche has two organs, a small one in the choir, built in 1985 by Oberlinger, and a main organ built in 1972 by Seifert from Kevelaer.
