= Teltschik =

The ethnically German Teltschik family forms an uninterrupted lineage which dates back to 1301 and which for nearly six hundred years held a hereditary judgeship in their historic homestead of Zauchtel. Formerly part of the Austrian Empire, Zauchtel is in the Sudetenland and is now part the Province of Moravia in the Czech Republic.

As a celebration of 700 years of family history, the Teltschik Tower was erected in 2001 near Wilhelmsfeld, Germany. There is also a memorial at the Masonic Cemetery in Weimar, Texas commemorating the immigration of three Teltschik brothers to the rolling hills of Central and Southeast Texas in the latter part of the nineteenth century, part of a greater wave of German and Czech immigration to that region.

== Notable Teltschiks ==
- Alfred Teltschik ( 1919-2009) and Herbert Teltschik ( 1918-2013), American duo pianists and teachers
- Dr. Walter Teltschik
- Hamm Teltschik
- Horst Teltschik (* 1940), German politician
- John Teltschik (* 1964), American Football player
- Wilhelm Teltschik (1863-1937), Austrian politician
