= Gorxheimertal =

- Municipality
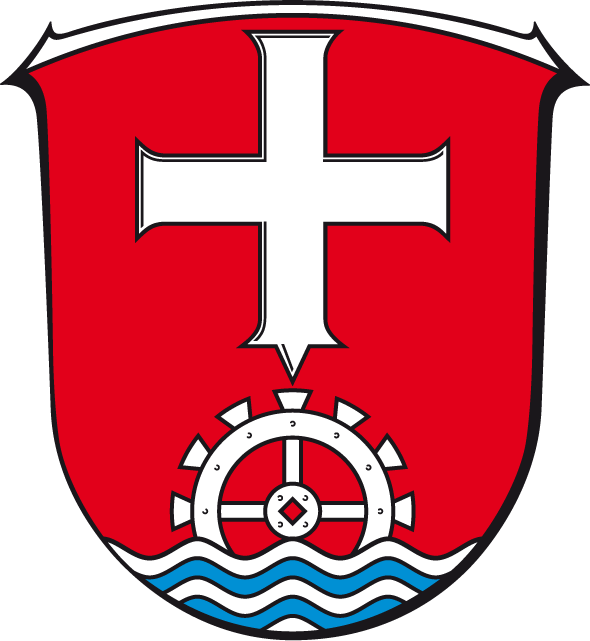
- Coat of arms

- Location of Gorxheimertal within Bergstraße district
- Interactive map of Gorxheimertal
- Location within Germany Location within Hesse
- Coordinates: 49°32′N 8°44′E
- Country: Germany
- State: Hesse
- Admin. region: Darmstadt
- District: Bergstraße
- Subdivisions: 3

Government
  - Mayor (2023–29): Frank Kohl

Area
  - Total: 10.46 km^{2} (4.04 sq mi)
- Elevation: 222 m (728 ft)

Population (2025-12-31)
  - Total: 4,165
  - Density: 398.2/km^{2} (1,031/sq mi)
- Time zone: UTC+01:00 (CET)
  - Summer (DST): UTC+02:00 (CEST)
- Postal codes: 69517
- Dialling codes: 06201
- Vehicle registration: HP
- Website: www.gorxheimertal.de

Gorxheimertal is a municipality in the Bergstraße district in Hesse, Germany. It is in the Odenwald and the Rhine Neckar Area.

== Geography ==
=== Location ===
The community lies along the length of the Grundelbach valley in the Odenwald. The nearest big town is Weinheim, and the way there also marks the division between the Odenwald and the Hessisches Ried (part of the Upper Rhine valley), as well as the boundary between Hesse and Baden-Württemberg.

Through the community’s namesake Gorxheim valley – it is called the Gorxheimertal in German – flows the Grundelbach. At the eastern point of the constituent community of Trösel rise the two mountains Waldskopf and Daumberg, which also mark the Gorxheim valley’s eastern limit.

=== Neighbouring communities ===
Gorxheimertal borders in the north on the community of Birkenau, in the east on the community of Abtsteinach, in the southeast on the community of Heiligkreuzsteinach and in the south and west on the town of Weinheim (both in the Rhein-Neckar-Kreis in Baden-Württemberg).

=== Constituent communities ===
The community’s Ortsteile are Gorxheim, Unter-Flockenbach and Trösel.

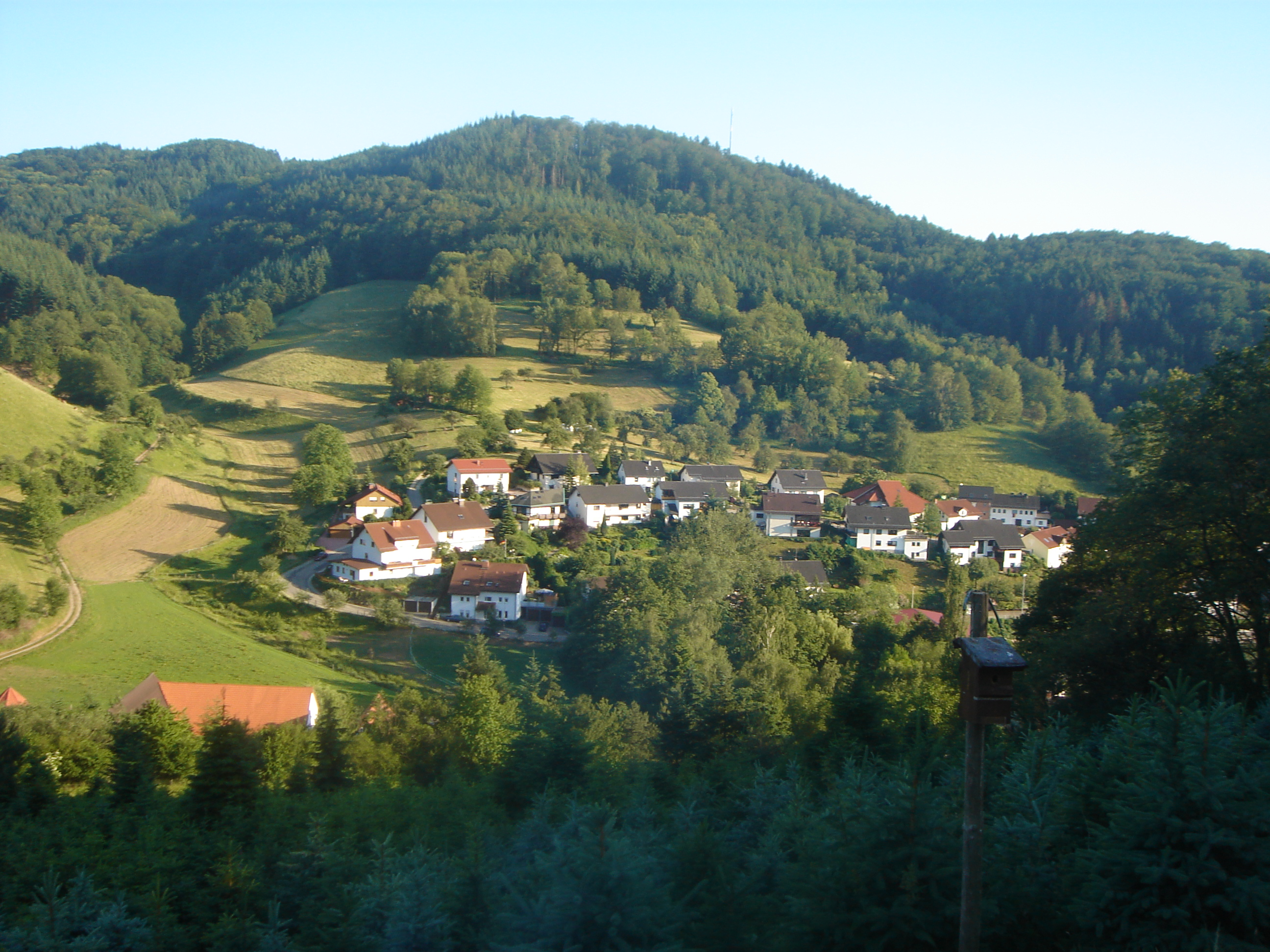
Daumberg in the Gorxheimertal

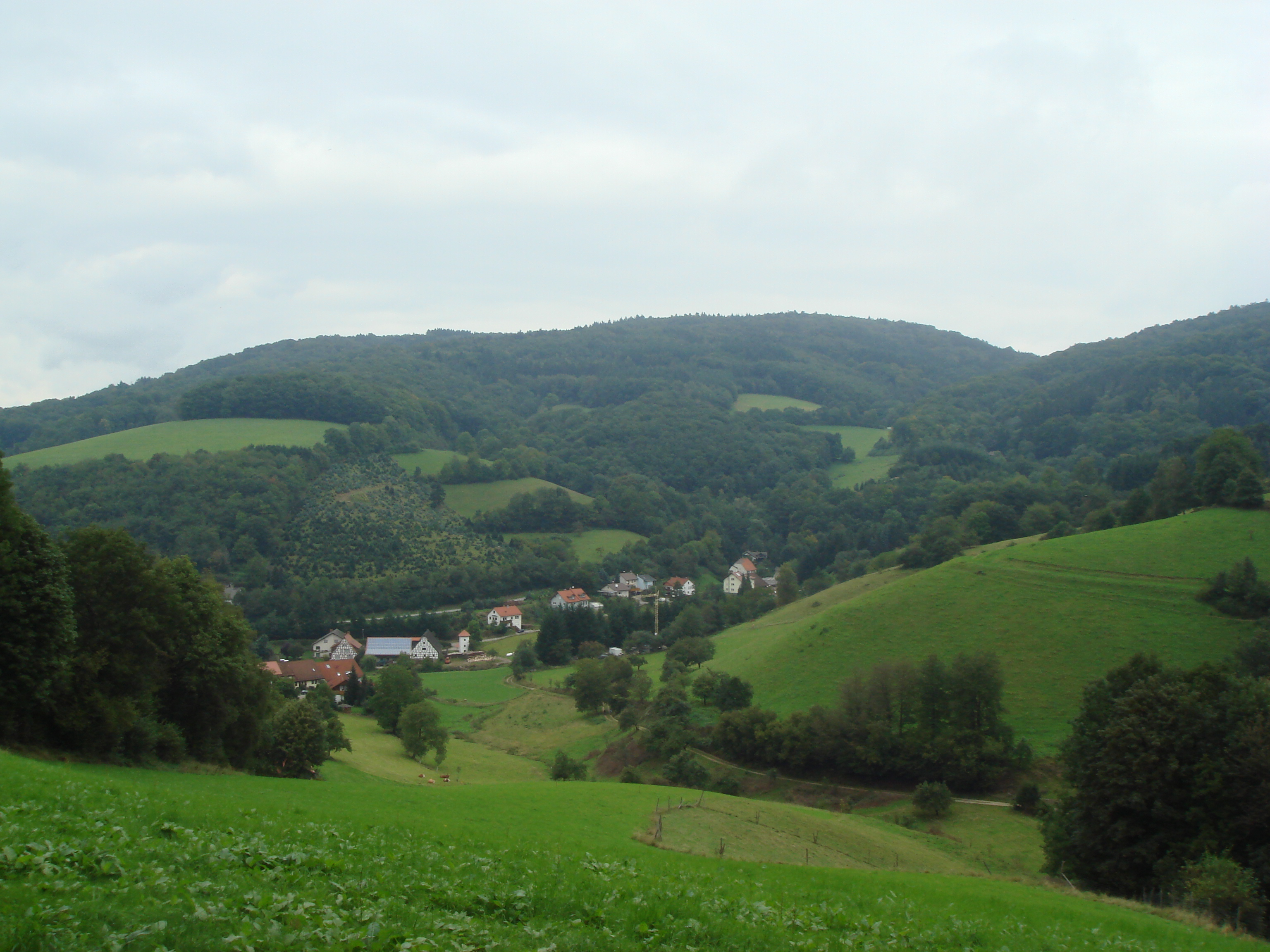
Waldskopf in the Gorxheimertal

== History ==
About 900, Unter-Flockenbach had its first documentary mention as a Waldhufendorf ("forest village"), followed by Trösel’s in 1071 as an offenes Reihen-Hufendorf (a similar concept). Gorxheim was first mentioned in 1486 in connection with a copper mine there. Originally the Lorsch Abbey’s holdings, the Archbishopric of Mainz acquired them in 1232, yielding them to Electoral Palatinate in 1463, which in 1623 passed them back to Mainz. In 1803, the valley became part of the Grand Duchy of Hesse, where it was administered within the Abtsteinach region (Bezirk).

=== Amalgamations ===
In 1971, the communities of Gorxheim and Unter-Flockenbach merged to form the community of Grundelbachtal, which itself then swallowed up the community of Trösel the next year to become today’s community of Gorxheimertal.

== Politics ==
=== Community council ===
The municipal election held on 26 March 2006 yielded the following results:

| Parties and voter communities | | % 2006 | Seats; 2006 | % 2001 | Seats; 2001 |
| CDU | Christian Democratic Union of Germany | 37.4 | 6 | 53.9 | 12 |
| SPD | Social Democratic Party of Germany | 33.3 | 6 | 46.1 | 11 |
| Pro-Tal | Pro-Gorxheimertal | 29.3 | 5 | – | – |
| Total | | 100.0 | 17 | 100.0 | 23 |
| Voter turnout in % | | 41.4 | | 46.7 | |
