= Wilhelmsfeld =

- Municipality
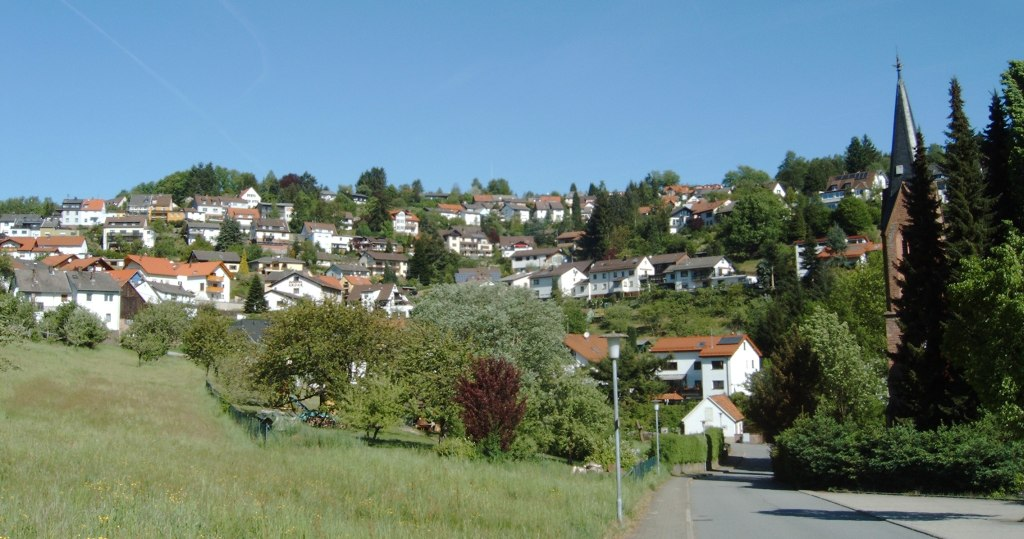
- View of the town

- Coat of arms

- Location of Wilhelmsfeld within Rhein-Neckar-Kreis district
- Interactive map of Wilhelmsfeld
- Location within Germany Location within Baden-Württemberg
- Coordinates: 49°28′18″N 08°45′20″E
- Country: Germany
- State: Baden-Württemberg
- Admin. region: Karlsruhe
- District: Rhein-Neckar-Kreis
- Founded: 1710

Government
  - Mayor (2022–30): Tobias Dangel

Area
  - Total: 4.75 km^{2} (1.83 sq mi)
- Elevation: 386 m (1,266 ft)

Population (2025-12-31)
  - Total: 3,365
  - Density: 708/km^{2} (1,830/sq mi)
- Time zone: UTC+01:00 (CET)
  - Summer (DST): UTC+02:00 (CEST)
- Postal codes: 69259
- Dialling codes: 06220
- Vehicle registration: HD
- Website: www.wilhelmsfeld.de

Wilhelmsfeld is a municipality in the Rhein-Neckar-Kreis of Baden-Württemberg in Germany.

== Geography ==
Wilhelmsfeld is a state-certified climatic health resort in the hills of the southern Odenwald, between 260 and 533m above sea-level. The surrounding communities are Heidelberg, Schriesheim, Heiligkreuzsteinach, and Schönau.

== History ==
Wilhelmsfeld was established in 1710, when Johann Wilhelm, prince-elector of the Electorate of the Palatinate, granted five farmers from the Steinach river valley the right to settle there. The settlement was named after the prince-elector, but it belonged to Heiligkreuzsteinach administratively. Wilhelmsfeld became independent in 1810, after the region was annexed by Baden.

== Government ==
=== Municipal council ===
The municipal council includes 14 councilors excluding the mayor (Bürgermeister).

Municipal Council 2004
| Party | Votes | Seats |
| Green | % | 4 |
| BGW | % | 3 |
| CDU | % | 3 |
| Independent (Freie Wähler Verein) | % | 3 |
| SPD | % | 1 |
Voter Participation: %

=== Coat of arms ===
The coat of arms is based on a seal from 1818. The coat of arms was created by the General State Archive in 1911 on basis of the seal. The sickle and the handaxe represent agriculture and forestry, the most important industries in Wilhelmsfeld in the 19th century.

The flag is white and blue and was awarded by the Ministry of the State in 1956.

== Culture and attractions ==
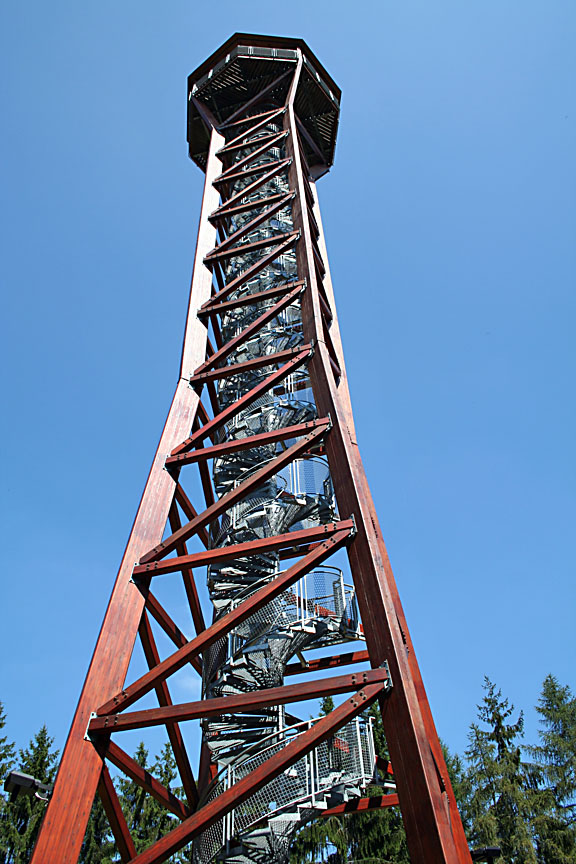
Teltschik Tower

The Teltschik Tower is a 41-meter-tall lookout tower, which stands on the mountain, Schriesheimer Kopf, at 530m above sea level. The tower was financed by a donation from the Teltschik family.

== Notable natives ==
The doctor, poet, and Philippine national hero, José Rizal, spent an important part of his life in Wilhelmsfeld. He stayed several months in 1886 with the Protestant pastor Ullmer's family, while he practiced medicine at the university eye clinic in Heidelberg. He finished the last chapters of his novel Noli Me Tángere while living under the pastor.

== Sister cities ==
- Calamba, Philippines
