= Bligger von Steinach =

Medieval German feudal lords of Steinach

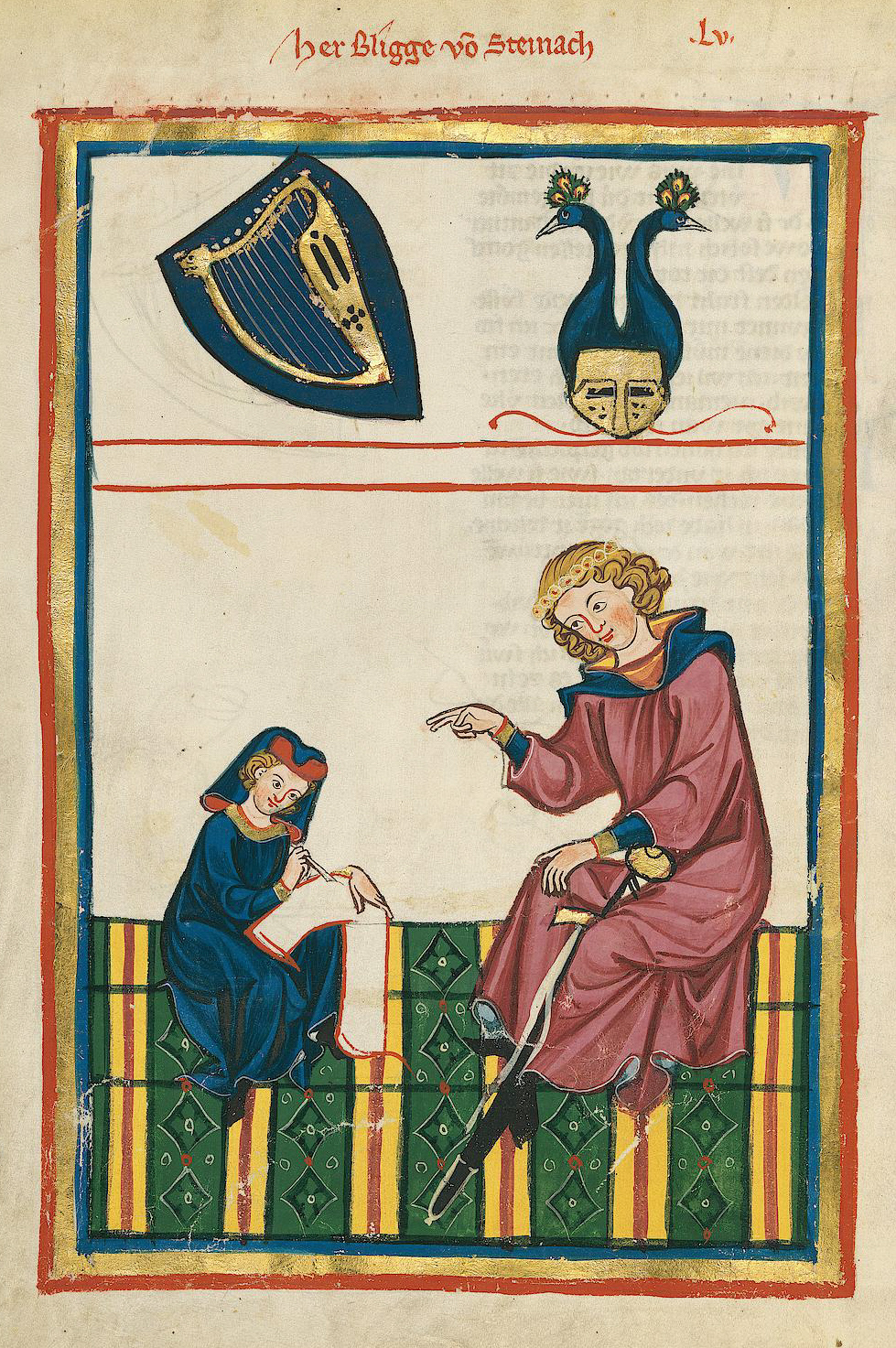
Bligger von Steinach depicted in the Codex Manesse (circa 1300)

Bligger von Steinach was the name of a series of feudal lords of Steinach, today Neckarsteinach in Hesse, Germany. Collectively the noble family was known as the Edelfreien von Steinach. The family was influential, having close connections to the Holy Roman Emperor and to the Bishopric of Worms. The family held Steinach in fief to Worms.

The name Bligger is of Germanic origin, meaning lightning spear.

Bligger I was first mentioned in a document from 1142 as bliggerus de steinahe. In 1150, Bligger's brother, was named Konrad I bishop of Worms. In 1171, Bligger was sent to Constantinople by Frederick I, Holy Roman Emperor to seek a bride for Frederick's son, Henry VI. There are indications that Bligger's son, Bligger II, and his brother Konrad accompanied him.

Bligger II (1152–1210) was a poet of the Minnesang and fief lord of Steinach. He was also a companion to two Staufer and contemporary of the Minnesinger Gottfried von Strassburg. Bligger's poems mention Damascus and Saladin and Bligger's homesickness, which some scholars take as an indication that Bligger either accompanied his father and uncle to Constantinople in 1171 or Bligger went on a crusade with Frederick I. Bligger was certainly a trustworthy companion to Henry IV and not just an entertainer. Bligger's signature appears on four imperial documents from 1193 to 1196 as Blikerus de Steinaha. A report of a Pentecostal festival from 1194 in Milano, in which the emperor Henry VI, Conrad II, Duke of Swabia, Philip of Swabia, Henry V, Count Palatine of the Rhine, and Bligger von Steinach. Bligger was also present when Henry VI was crowned king of Sicily in Palermo 1194. Two further imperial documents refer to the name Blikerus from the Toscana in 1194, but historians dispute whether this refers to Bligger II or his son Bligger III. Bligger appears from 1152 to 1208 in numerous documents of Schönau Abbey, Lorch Abbey, Eberbach Abbey, and in imperial documents.

As a poet, Bligger II was mentioned by Gottfried von Strassburg in his work Tristan und Isolt. There he praised his "sweet words and clever sensibilities musically entwined". Gottfried also praised Bligger's work der umbehanc (The Tapestry), which remains lost to this day. Some scholars argue that this work refers to the Nibelungenlied, but this remains in dispute. Bligger's work appears in the Codex Manesse. The codex also displays the coat-of-arms that he created. It is a harp, which is used today by the city of Neckarsteinach.
