= Schönau (Odenwald) =

- Town
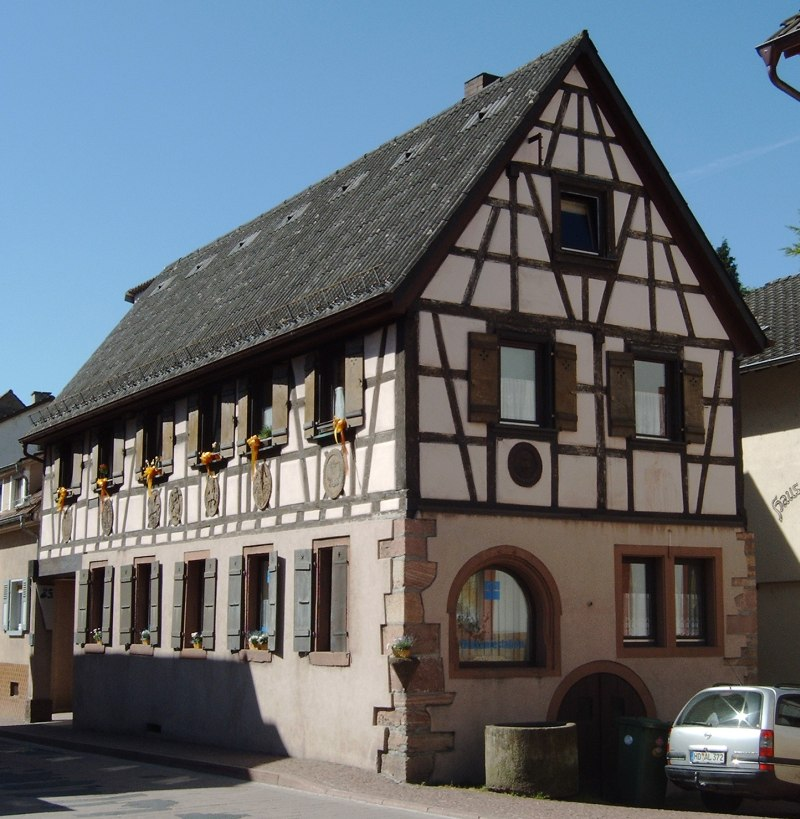
- Old post office

- Flag Coat of arms

- Location of Schönau within Rhein-Neckar-Kreis district
- Interactive map of Schönau
- Location within Germany Location within Baden-Württemberg
- Coordinates: 49°26′08″N 08°48′33″E
- Country: Germany
- State: Baden-Württemberg
- Admin. region: Karlsruhe
- District: Rhein-Neckar-Kreis

Government
  - Mayor (2019–27): Matthias Frick

Area
  - Total: 22.49 km^{2} (8.68 sq mi)
- Elevation: 180 m (590 ft)

Population (2025-12-31)
  - Total: 4,328
  - Density: 192.4/km^{2} (498.4/sq mi)
- Time zone: UTC+01:00 (CET)
  - Summer (DST): UTC+02:00 (CEST)
- Postal codes: 69250
- Dialling codes: 06228
- Vehicle registration: HD
- Website: www.stadt-schoenau.de

Schönau (German pronunciation: [ˈʃøːnaʊ]) is a city with approximately 4400 inhabitants in the district of Rhein-Neckar-Kreis, in Baden-Württemberg, Germany. It is situated in the Odenwald hills, 10 km northeast of Heidelberg. Schönau Abbey is located here.

== Geography ==
Schönau lies on the southern slope of the Odenwald hills, in the valley of the River Steinach, a tributary of the Neckar River.

=== Neighbouring Communities ===
The city is bordered to the north by Heiligkreuzsteinach, by Heddesbach to the northeast, by Hirschhorn to the east, Neckarsteinach and Neckargemünd to the south, and Wilhelmsfeld and Heidelberg to the west.

=== City structure ===
The city Schönau belongs to the former municipality Altneudorf (German: combination of the words "old", "new" and "village"), which was created by the conglomeration of the villages Oberdorf and Unterdorf. On 8 May 1975 when municipal reform updated the city's zoning, Schönau's borders came to include Bei Altneudorf, Landheim Lessingschule (Lochmühle), Lindenbach and the houses of Hasselbacherhof. Additionally, the deserted village Bauerländerhof lies within its designated limits.

== History ==
=== Schönau ===
Schönau was first historically documented with the founding of the Schönau Abbey by the Prince-Bishopric of Worms in 1142. The monastery came under the patronage of the Electoral Palatinate in the 12th century and became a House monastery, abode and burial place of the Counts Palatine of the Rhine. In the Reformation, the Palatinate converted to Protestantism, until 1558 when Elector Palatine Otto Henry was succeeded by a secular caretaker and the monks were expelled. In 1562 with the arrival of 35 Calvinism refugee families from Wallonia, the dwelling rights were passed on to Die Evangelische Stiftung Pflege Schonau (Evangelische_Stiftung_Pflege_Schönau) (German: The Evangelical Trust for the Care of Schönau) and the monastery grounds were converted to residential purposes. The immigrants brought their craft, mainly weaving and dyeing, into the rural environment.

Schönau was first designated a city in 1600. At the beginning of the 19th century, Schönau was part of Baden. In 1900, the city had approximately 2000 inhabitants. In 1935 Schönau's city designation was revoked, but reissued in 1956. After World War II the city took in 553 refugees, increasing the population to 3035 in 1947.

The ornithologist Christian Ludwig Brehm was born in Schönau in 1787.

=== Altneudorf ===
The first mention of Altneudorf appears in 1316 as "Nuendorf". The settlement was created by the Strahlenberg dynasty from Waldeck in approximately the 13th century. From 1357 it was associated with their castle's domain, until 1803 when the settlement was allocated to Baden upon dissolution. Beginning in the 18th century, the name "Neudorf" came into usage in order to differentiate the area as a separate entity to Wilhelmsfeld. Although the region had its own district and assets, it belonged politically to Heiligkreuzsteinach until independence in 1844.

=== Incorporation ===
The city in its present form was created as part of municipal reform in Baden-Württemberg (Gebietsreform in Baden-Württemberg) through the unification of Schönau and Altneudorf on 9 May 1975.

Population over time
Year	1727	1818	1852	1905	1939	1950	1961	1970	1975	1991	1995	2000	2005	2010	2015
Altneudorf	116	302	501	487	581	765	807	1163							
Schönau	470	1163	1974	2056	2104	3031	3271	3357							
Combined	586	1465	2475	2543	2685	3796	4078	4520	4381	4524	4619	4786	4793	4526	4370
