= Pargny-sur-Saulx =

- Commune
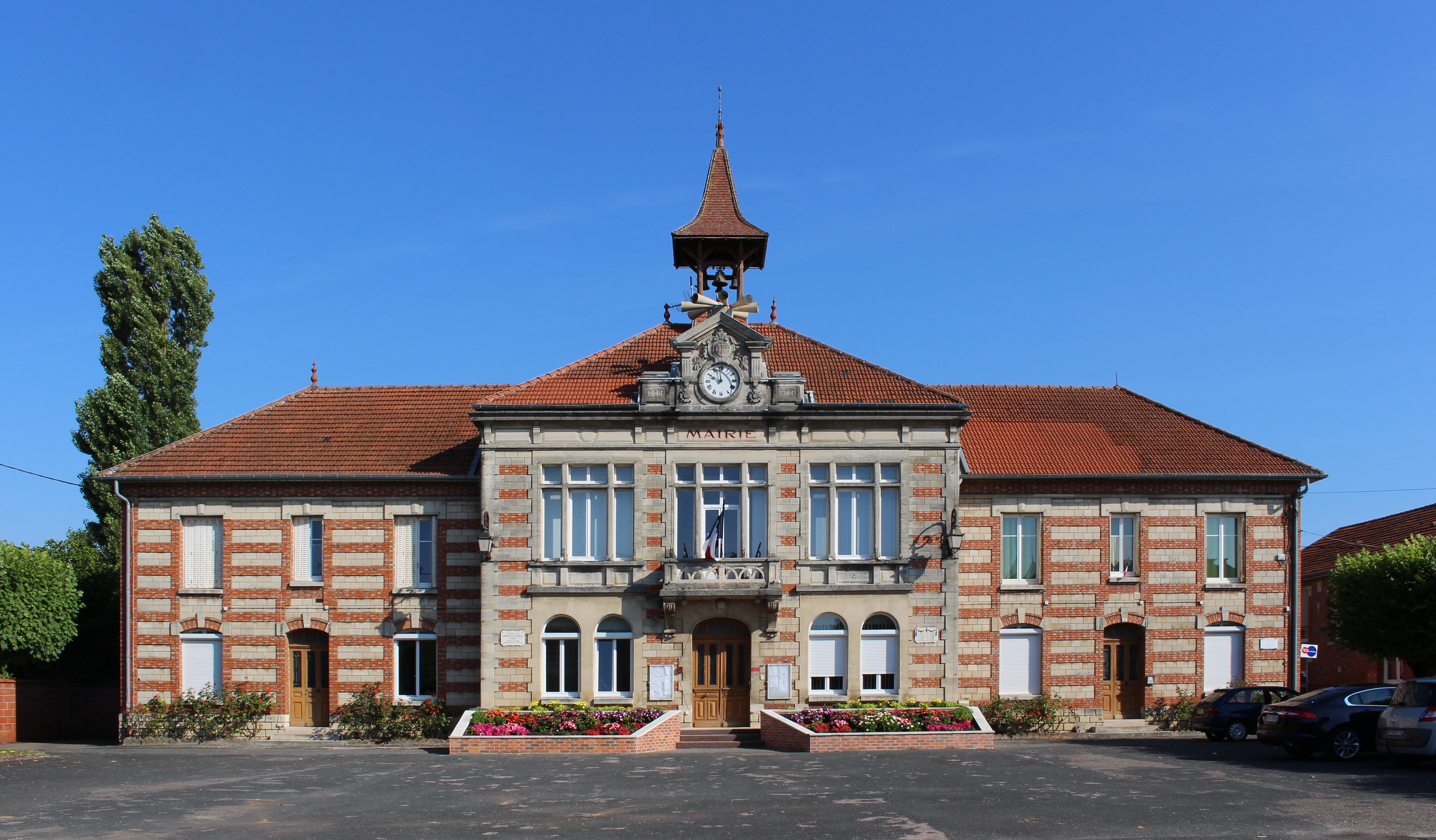
- The city hall

- Coat of arms
- Location of Pargny-sur-Saulx
- Location within France Location within Grand Est
- Coordinates: 48°46′12″N 4°50′19″E
- Country: France
- Region: Grand Est
- Department: Marne
- Arrondissement: Vitry-le-François
- Canton: Sermaize-les-Bains

Government
  - Mayor (2020–2026): Jean-Claude Cabart
- Area^{1}: 12.44 km^{2} (4.80 sq mi)
- Elevation: 130 m (430 ft)
- Highest elevation: 166 m (545 ft)
- Lowest elevation: 115 m (377 ft)
- Population (2023): 1,654
  - Density: 133.0/km^{2} (344.4/sq mi)
- Time zone: UTC+01:00 (CET)
  - Summer (DST): UTC+02:00 (CEST)
- INSEE/Postal code: 51423 /51340
- ^{1} French Land Register data, which excludes lakes, ponds, glaciers > 1 km^{2} (0.386 sq mi or 247 acres) and river estuaries.

Pargny-sur-Saulx (French pronunciation: [paʁɲi syʁ so], literally Pargny on Saulx) is a commune in the Marne department in north-eastern France.

Pargny-sur-Saulx is known for its tiles, which are exported sometimes to Singapore, giving it the nickname "the city of the tiles". In addition the town is situated about 18 kilometres from Lac du Der-Chantecoq.

== Names of the commune since its creation ==
In 1179 : Parni
In 1189 : Parneium
later : Parnenium
In 1232 : Pargneium
In 1240 : Pargny
In 1273 : Pargnei-sur-Saulx
In 1300 : Pargny
In 1397 : Parigny
In 1401 : Pargney
In 1508 : Parguy-sur-Saulx
In 1510 : Prygni
In 1546 : Perriguy
In 1571 : Parigny
In 1633 : Pargny-sur-saulx

== The Church of Assomption-de-Notre-Dame ==
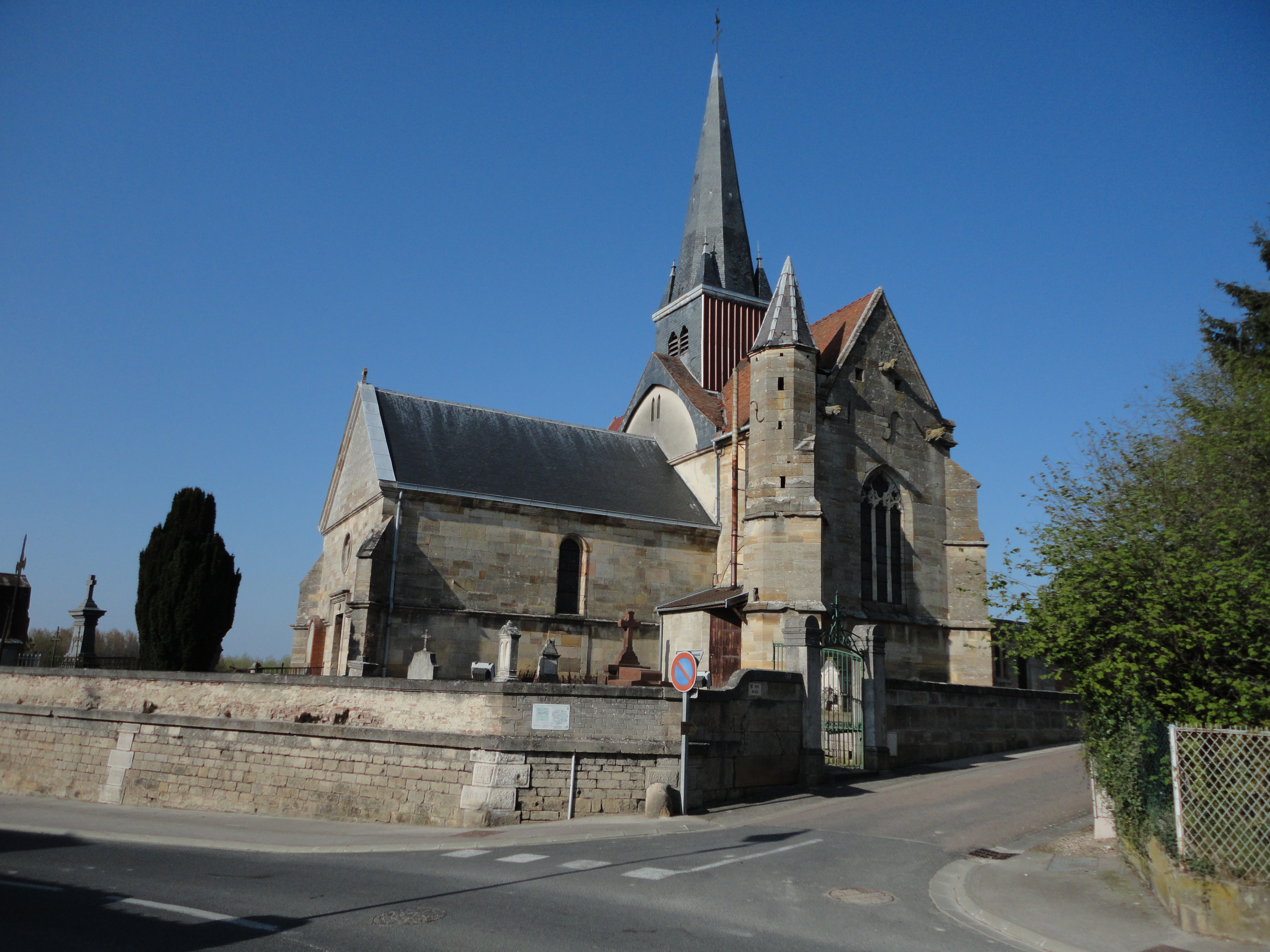
The church during spring

Apse and transept in a flamboyant style, with gargoyles to the south. 18th century nave.

== Twin towns ==
Pargny-sur-Saulx is twinned with:

- Neckarsteinach, Germany

== See also ==
- Champagne Riots
- Communes of the Marne department
- French wine
