= Nienberge =

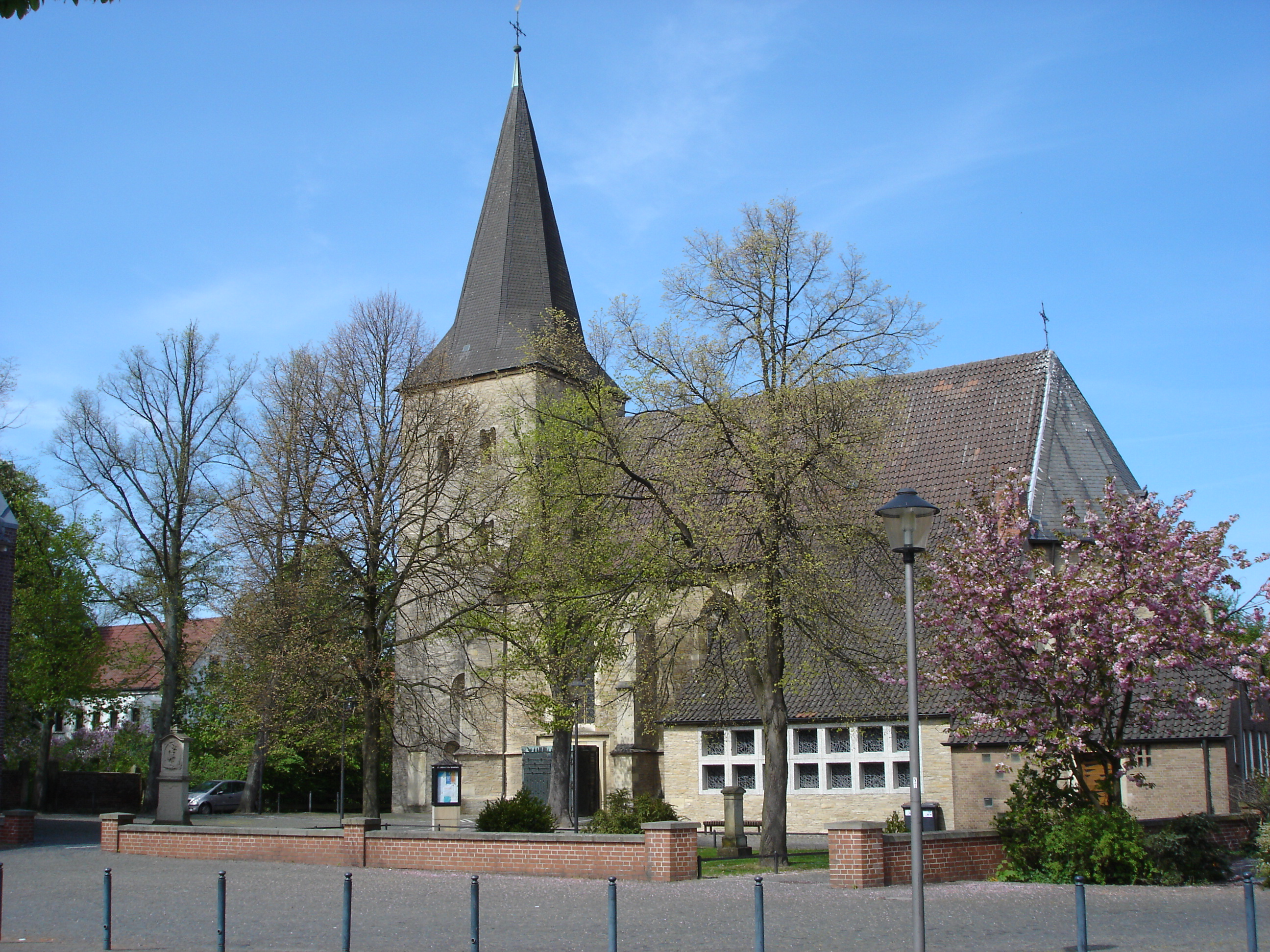
St. Sebastian in Nienberge

Nienberge is a German community. It was independent until 1975 and has been part of Münster, North Rhine-Westphalia, since, located in the north-west of the town. It houses around 7,000 people. The independent community became part of Münster on 1 January 1975.

== Sights ==
- St. Sebastian, Catholic parish church with late-Romanesque steeple (c. 1200) and late-Gothic nave (1499)
- Rüschhaus, built by Johann Conrad Schlaun in Baroque style, later home of Annette von Droste-Hülshoff
- Orgelmuseum Fleiter

== People from Nienberge ==
- Annette von Droste-Hülshoff (1797–1848), poet and composer, her mother Therese, née von Haxthausen (1772–1853), her sister Jenny von Droste zu Hülshoff (1795–1859) and Jenny's nephews Moritz and Friedrich von Droste zu Hülshoff (1833–1905)
- Rolf Krumsiek (1934–2009), politician (SPD), Minister für Wissenschaft und Forschung and Justizminister of North Rhine-Westphalia
- Harald Sievers (born 1975), politician (CDU), Landrat of Landkreis Ravensburg
- Christian Pander (born 1983), footballer

== Literature ==
- Karl Moritz (ed.): Chronik von Nienberge. Heimatverein Nienberge 1983.
