= Neckarsteinach =

- Town
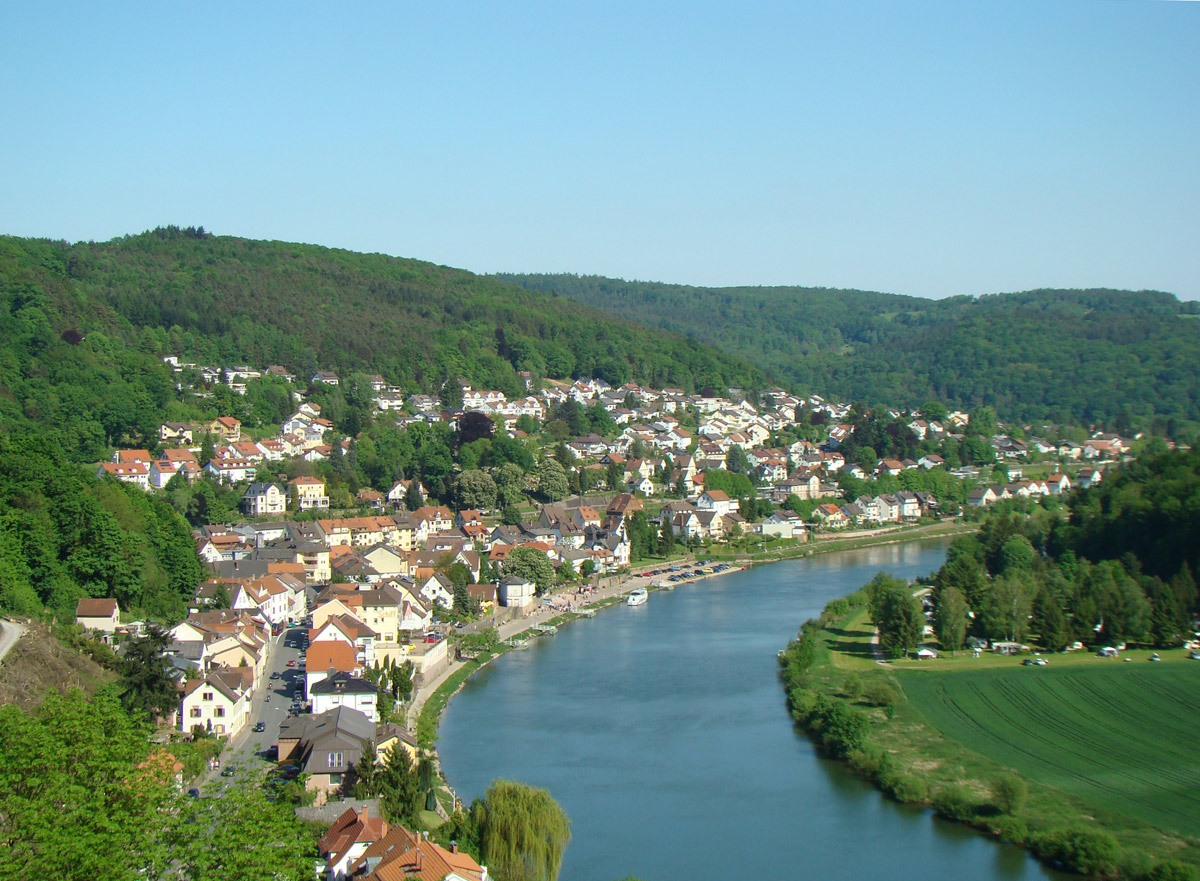
- View from the Hinterburg

- Coat of arms

- Location of Neckarsteinach within Bergstraße district
- Interactive map of Neckarsteinach
- Location within Germany Location within Hesse
- Coordinates: 49°24′N 8°50′E
- Country: Germany
- State: Hesse
- Admin. region: Darmstadt
- District: Bergstraße

Government
  - Mayor (2024–30): Lutz Spitzner

Area
  - Total: 17.24 km^{2} (6.66 sq mi)
- Elevation: 120 m (390 ft)

Population (2025-12-31)
  - Total: 3,782
  - Density: 219.4/km^{2} (568.2/sq mi)
- Time zone: UTC+01:00 (CET)
  - Summer (DST): UTC+02:00 (CEST)
- Postal codes: 69239
- Dialling codes: 06229
- Vehicle registration: HD
- Website: www.neckarsteinach.de

The four-castle town of Neckarsteinach (German pronunciation: [nɛkaʁˈʃtaɪnax]) lies on the Neckar in the Bergstraße district in the southernmost part of Hesse, Germany, 15 km east of Heidelberg.

== Geography ==
=== Location ===
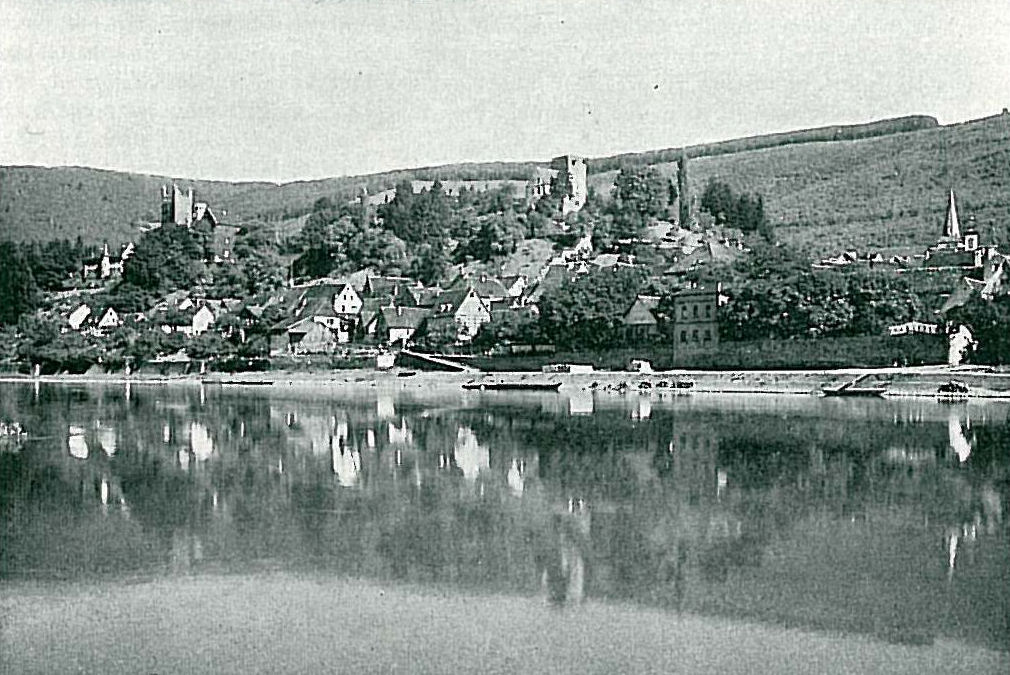
Old view of Neckarsteinach in 1896 with Mittelburg (left) and Vorderburg (right)

Both by way of transport and culture, Neckarsteinach's location in the Neckar valley more tightly links it with the North Baden area around Heidelberg than with the rest of Hesse. It is furthermore one of the municipalities belonging, like the ones in the surrounding districts, to the Rhine Neckar Area. It lies mainly on the Neckar's north bank along the B 37 and the Neckartalbahn (railway) and is Hesse's and the Bergstraße district's southernmost town, 15 km east of Heidelberg. Along the former railway spur line to Schönau, a further population centre was built to the northwest, that is to say, behind the Burgberg (“Castle Mountain”). In the east of town lies a smaller industrial area, a shipyard that arose out of shipbuilding, south of the B 37 on the Neckar marsh.

Neckarsteinach's core lies southeast of and below the Vorderburg – one of four castles in town – and beginning in the 14th century it and the castle were girded by the same wall with the current town centre serving as the castle hamlet. The community was bordered in the north and east by the river Steinach, in the south by the Neckar and in the west by the Burgberg. The landscape near Neckarsteinach is in particular characterized by the cone of the Bergfeste Dilsberg lying across the Neckar (in Neckargemünd, Baden-Württemberg), around which the Neckar flows in a broad bend.

=== Constituent communities ===
Neckarsteinach's outlying centres of Darsberg and Grein are old settlements uphill to the north in the Odenwald; the outlying centre of Neckarhausen lies 3 km upstream in the Neckar valley. It should not be confused with the like-named place, also in the Neckar valley, west of Heidelberg and across the river from Ladenburg; that Neckarhausen is a constituent community of Edingen-Neckarhausen.

Population: (as at: 31 December 2003)

Neckarsteinach: 3,160
Darsberg: 547
Grein: 142
Neckarhausen: 266
Total: 4,115

=== Neighbouring communities ===
Neckarsteinach borders in the north on the town of Hirschhorn and the unincorporated area of Michelbuch, in the east on the town of Hirschhorn and the community of Schönbrunn, in the south on the town of Neckargemünd, and in the west on the town of Schönau (all three in the Rhein-Neckar-Kreis in Baden-Württemberg).

== History ==
The earliest human habitation of what is now Neckarsteinach presumably took place in prehistoric times, for the water- and wood-rich area was ideal for hunting and fishing, and afforded a place sheltered from the cold north and east winds. In the 7th century, the area around Neckarsteinach belonged to the Lobdengau, and passed along with it to the high monastery at Worms, when its fiefholder Bligger von Steinach was first mentioned. Worms or Bligger and his sons and grandsons build the four Neckarsteinach castles, whose history is so tightly bound to the town's.

In the 14th century, the town was surrounded with defensive walls by the Landschad family of Steinach, turning the Vorderburg (one of the castles) and the town together into an enclosed fortification. Nevertheless, the town itself was only half owned by the keepers of the Vorderburg, while those of the Hinterburg (another of the castles) owned the other half. In 1377, Neckarsteinach was mentioned as a town for the first time, and at the same time it became an “open house” of Count Palatine Ruprecht, who could then use it in case of a feud against anyone other than the Bishop of Worms as though he were the town's fiefholder. In 1381 the first town hall was built, and in the early 15th century, Neckarsteinach received a town charter, which in the years that followed was changed and expanded. The oldest preserved town charter dates from 1537.

Since Hans III Landschad von Steinach became Lutheran in 1522, the Reformation was already fully in place in Neckarsteinach quite early on. In 1526, the Lutheran preacher Jakob Otter was working in town.

In the Thirty Years' War, the town suffered heavily. The Catholic League under Tilly, after conquering Ladenburg in the autumn of 1621 also took Neckarsteinach, whence the Dilsberg mountain fortress across the river was besieged in April 1622. After retreating for a short while to Sinsheim, the Catholic troops came back for the Battle of Wimpfen and quartered themselves in the town, where the Plague then broke out. In 1631, the Bavarian occupation troops were driven out by Swedish troops, before, in 1634, there were Imperial troops in town. Then once more came another wave of the Plague.

After the Landschad family of Steinach died out in 1653, the Bishoprics of Worms and Speyer at first oversaw the fief, with the latter living at the Hinterburg. In 1657, the episcopal fief was given to Wolf Heinrich Metternich von Burscheid, who had kinship with the Archbishop of Mainz, and who also acquired the allodial properties from the Landschads’ legacy. Metternich was old-school – that is to say, Catholic – and encouraged other Catholics to come and settle in town. The Evangelical church in Neckarsteinach therefore ended up housing up to three denominations from 1662 to 1908. In the Nine Years' War (1688–1697), French, Saxon, Brandenburgish and Bavarian troops passed through the Neckar valley and quartered there and are said to have made contributions.

After 1685, many Huguenots – known locally as Welsche – who had been driven out of France for their beliefs, came to settle in Neckarsteinach. They were clothmakers and tanners, and with their skills, the town underwent an upswing offsetting some of the losses from the wars that had taken their toll.

In the early 18th century, Neckarsteinach was quarters and a field hospital site in the War of the Spanish Succession (1701–1714), the War of the Polish Succession (1733–1738) and the War of the Austrian Succession (1740–48) for troops engaged in these wars.

In 1699, ownership of Neckarsteinach passed by matrilineal inheritance to Caspar Hugo von Metternich zu Müllenark. His heirs later pledged the ownership of Neckarsteinach in 1738 to the baronial von Hundheim heirs, who were likewise set up as local lords once it became clear that the Metternichs could no longer redeem their pledge. Each lord then hired his own Schultheiß (roughly, “sheriff”), resulting in bitter quarrels, not only between the lords, but also among the townsfolk, over just who was in charge. Only in 1750 did Hugo Franz Wolfgang Metternich manage to allay the town's concerns by uniting lordly authority in himself. He, however, died only four years later, whereupon both the Electorate of the Palatinate and the Bishopric of Worms laid claim to the town, each taking palpable measures to ensure its claim. The town passed first to the Electorate of the Palatinate, though through Imperial mandate it was given to the monasteries at Worms and Speyer in 1763. With mediatization in 1803, Neckarsteinach became part of Hesse.

In 1842 and 1843, the state road from Eberbach to Heidelberg was built, for which the town wall had to be breached. In 1878 chain-driven shipping began on the Neckar, and the next year, the Neckartalbahn (railway) reached town.

== Politics ==
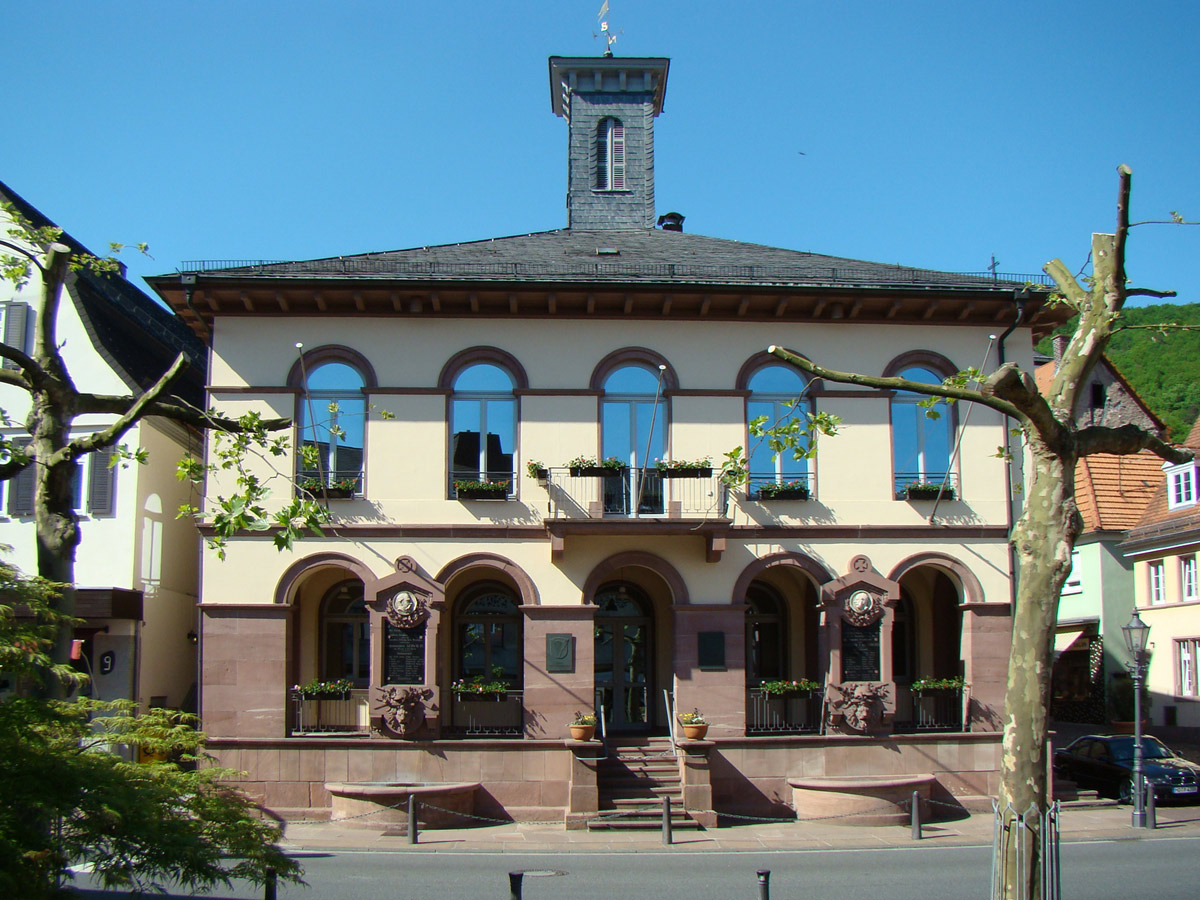
Neckarsteinach Town Hall

=== Town council ===
The municipal election held on 26 March 2006 yielded the following results:

Parties and voter communities		% 2006	Seats; 2006	% 2001	Seats; 2001
CDU	Christian Democratic Union of Germany	25.8	5	31.2	7
SPD	Social Democratic Party of Germany	42.8	8	46.4	11
FWG	Freie Wählergemeinschaft	31.4	6	22.4	5
Total		100.0	19	100.0	23
Voter turnout in %		55.4		57.9	

The town executive (Magistrat) is made up of 6 councillors. Two seats each are allotted to the SPD, the FWG and the CDU.

=== Mayor ===
Mayor Eberhard Petri was reelected on 26 March 2006 with 73.8% of the vote. Herold Pfeifer, (SPD) was elected in March 2012, and re-elected in 2018.

The chief councillor and deputy mayor is Elisabeth Hinz (FWG).

=== Name and coat of arms ===
The town draws its name from a feature in the local geography. It is here that the Steinach, a brook from the Odenwald, empties into the Neckar, and the town's name is simply a compound of those two names.

The town's arms refer to the Minnesänger Bligger von Steinach (fl. 1200), who was also a local nobleman, and even at the time bore arms with the harp as a charge.

=== Town partnerships ===
- Pargny-sur-Saulx, Marne, France
- Grein an der Donau, Perg, Austria

== Culture and sightseeing ==
=== Four castles ===
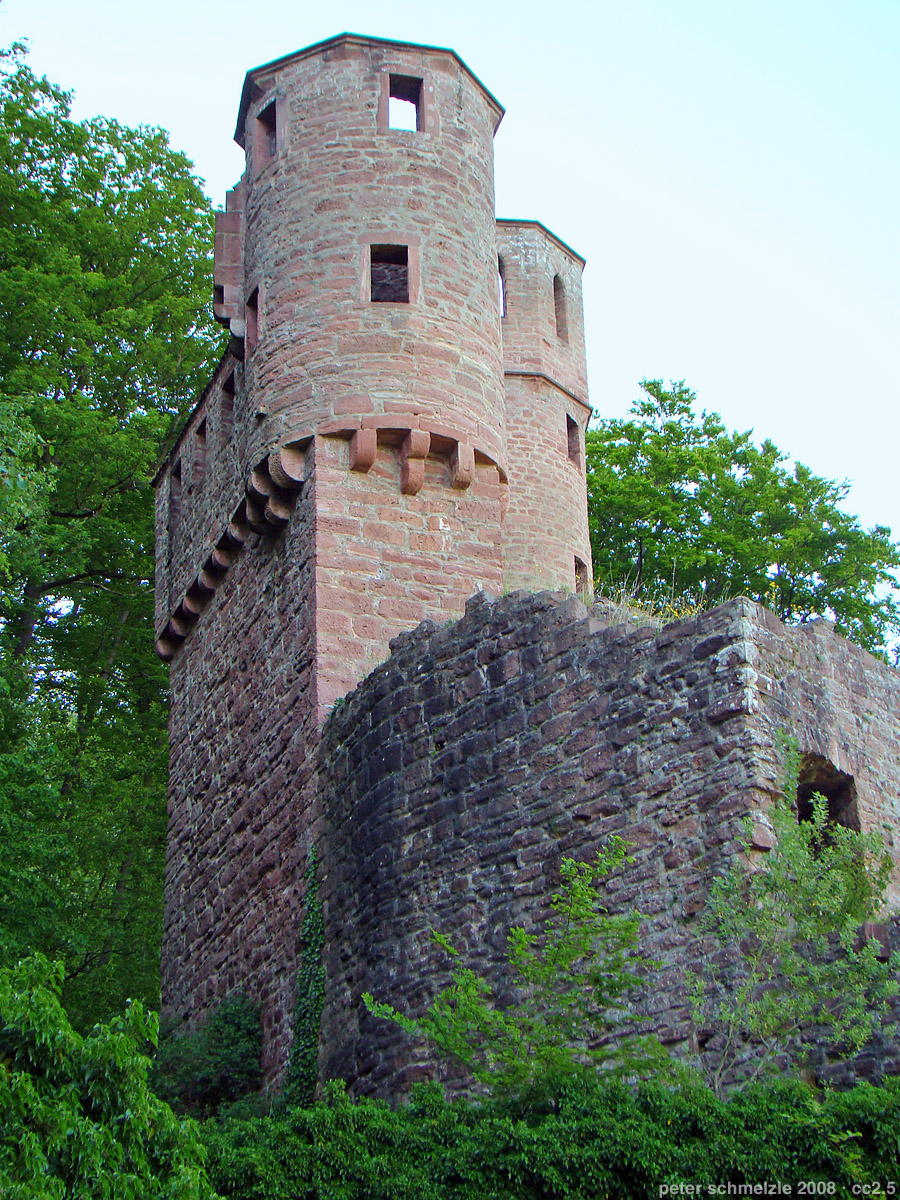
Schwalbennest

Neckarsteinach's foremost sights are its four castles, which stand on crags or the slope leading down to the Neckar. They are the Vorderburg (“Fore-castle” or “Further Castle”), the Mittelburg (“Middle Castle”), the Hinterburg (“Hind-castle” or “Hinder Castle”) and the Schadeck (also called the Schwalbennest, or “Swallows’ Nest”). The castles were built between 1100 and 1230 by the Landschad von Steinach family, partly as a Worms or Speyer fief, partly as an allodial holding. In the Late Middle Ages, some were owned by various other lords of the lower nobility. In the 16th century, they all found themselves back in the Landschads’ ownership. After the family died out in 1653, they were owned by a line of the von Metternichs, and after they, too, died out in 1753, the castles were held by the Bishoprics of Worms and Speyer. Eventually, with mediatization in 1803, they passed to Hesse, which sold the Vorderburg into private ownership and relinquished the Mittelburg along with the now ruined Hinterburg to those who had inherited the allodial property, the Barons of Dorth, who later also acquired the Vorderburg, whereas they chose to give the Hinterburg ruin back to the state. The Mittelburg, which was built into a Renaissance palace in the 16th century and Gothicized in the 19th century, is nowadays home to the von Warsberg-Dorth family; the Vorderburg is the Warsberg forest administration's seat. The Hinterburg and Schadeck are freely visitable to the public. Particularly worth seeing at the Schadeck is the view over the bow in the Neckar and the Dilsberg mountain fortress over on the other side.

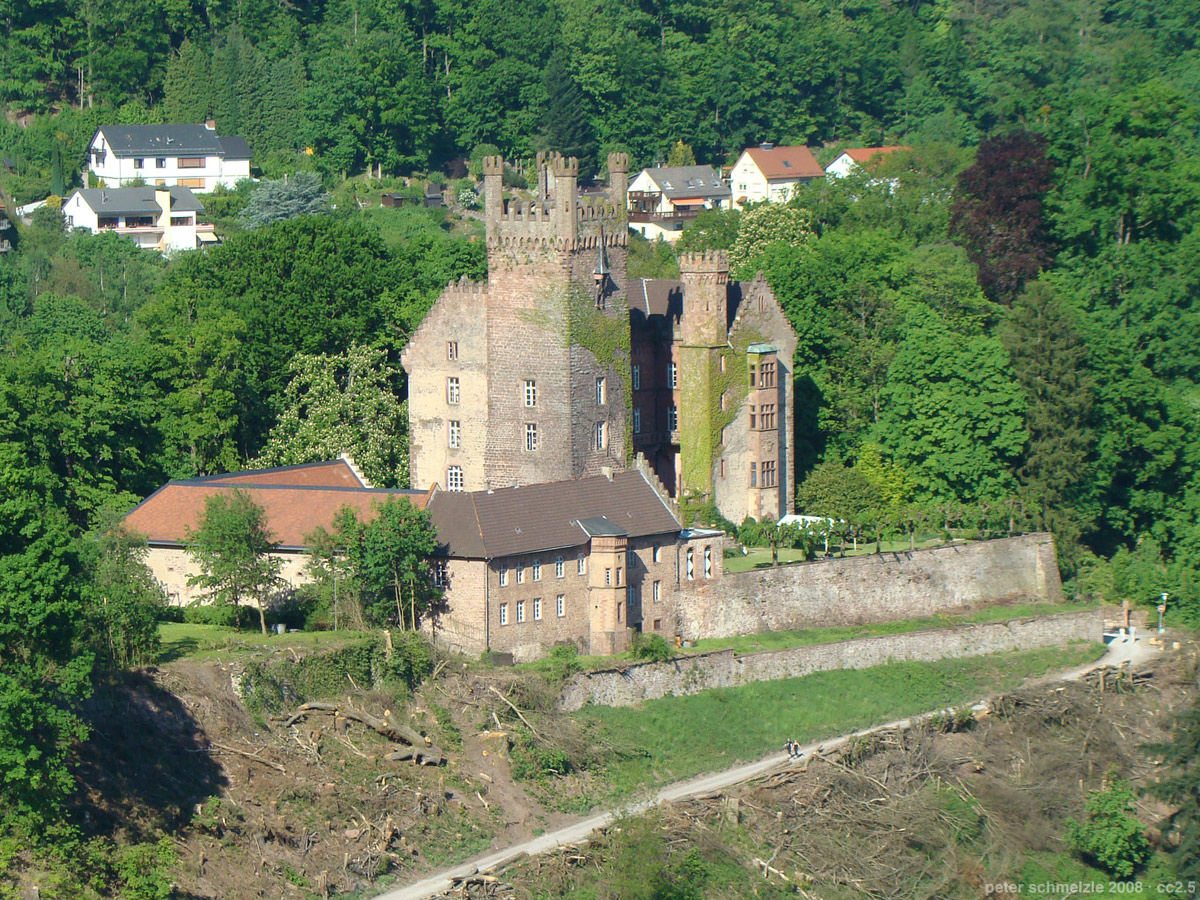
Mittelburg

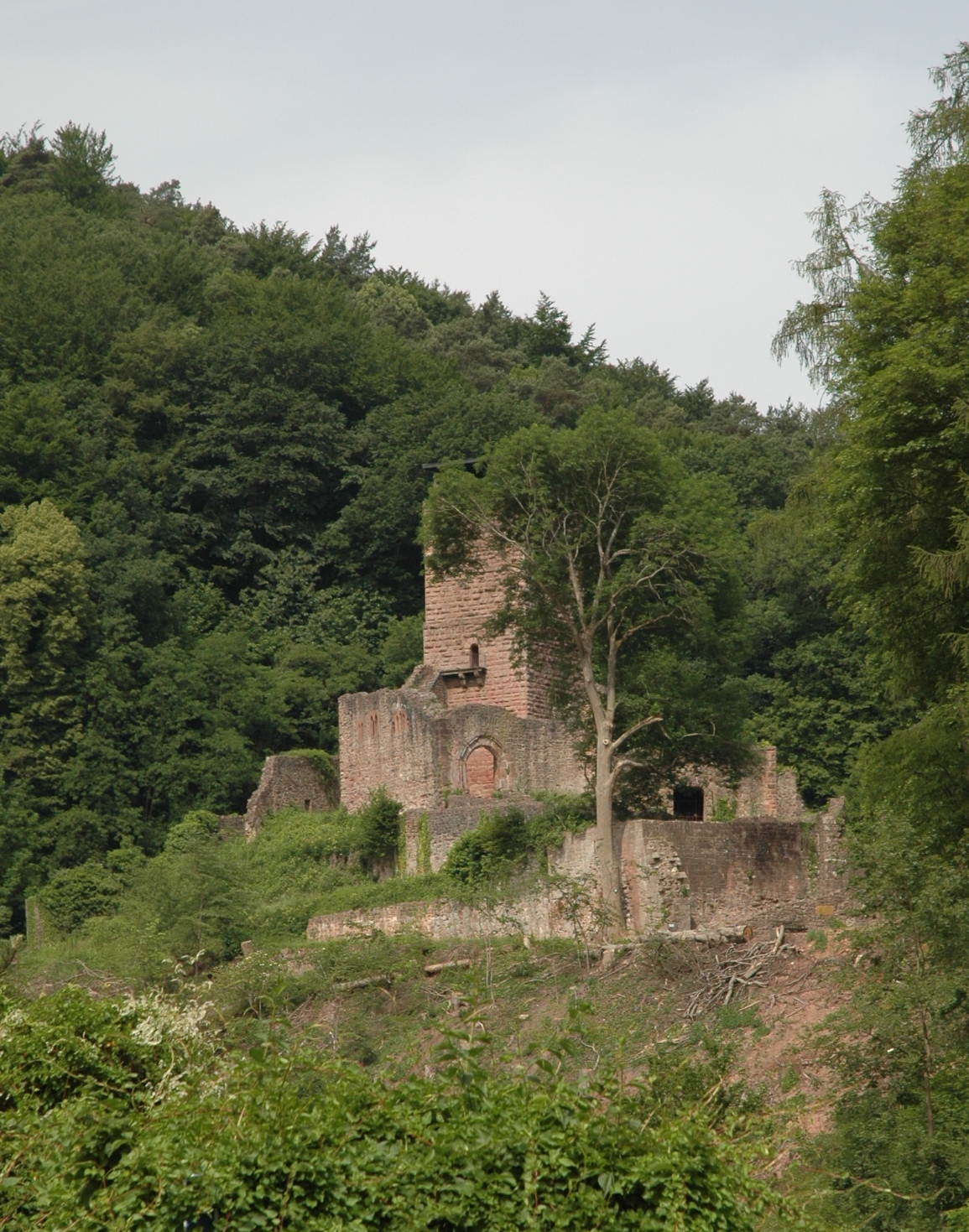
Hinterburg

=== Other buildings ===
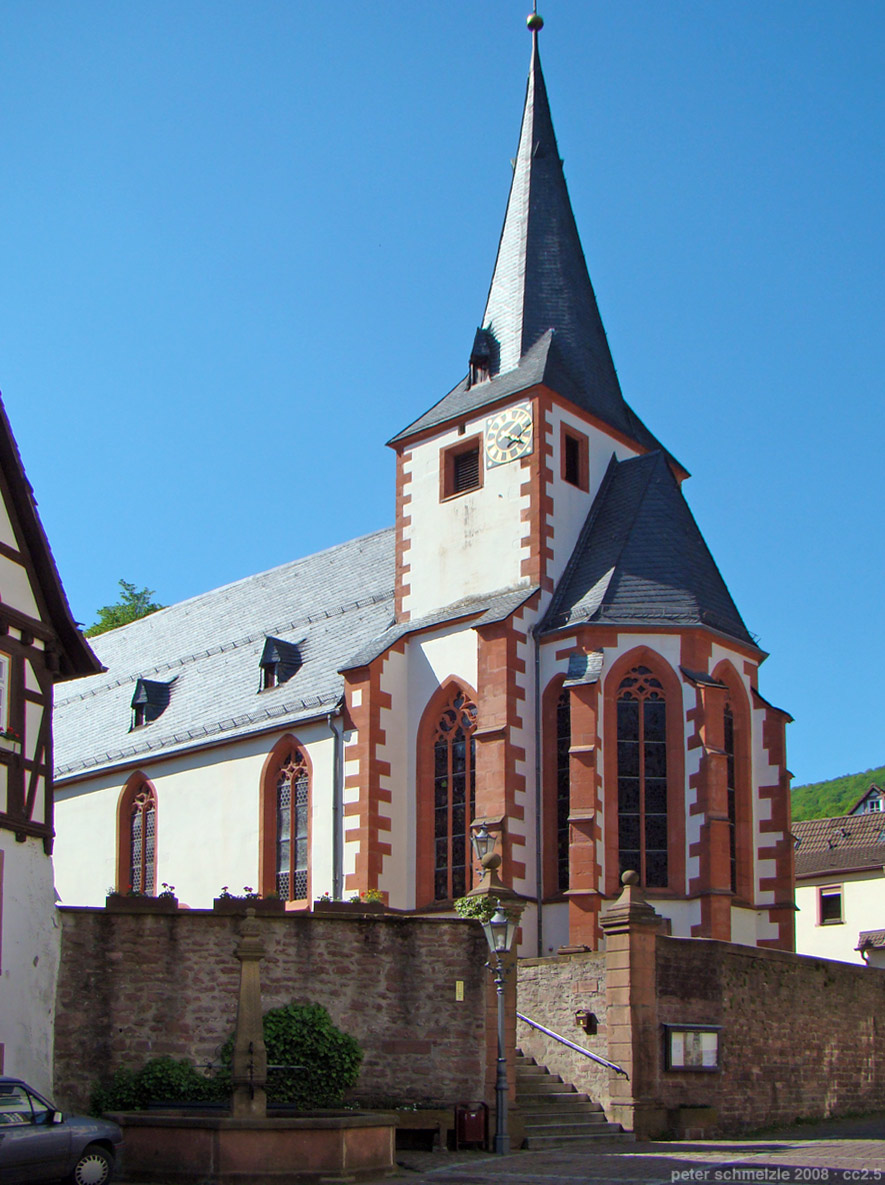
Evangelical church

- The Neckarsteinach Evangelical Church goes back to the town's original church and was newly built in 1483 in the Late Gothic style by Blicker XIV Landschad von Steinach. The church was reformed in the early 16th century, but then from 1662 to 1908 it was used as an interdenominational church for up to three denominations. Among the church's most important art treasures are many epitaphs of the Landschad von Steinach family and replicas of the stained glass windows from 1483.
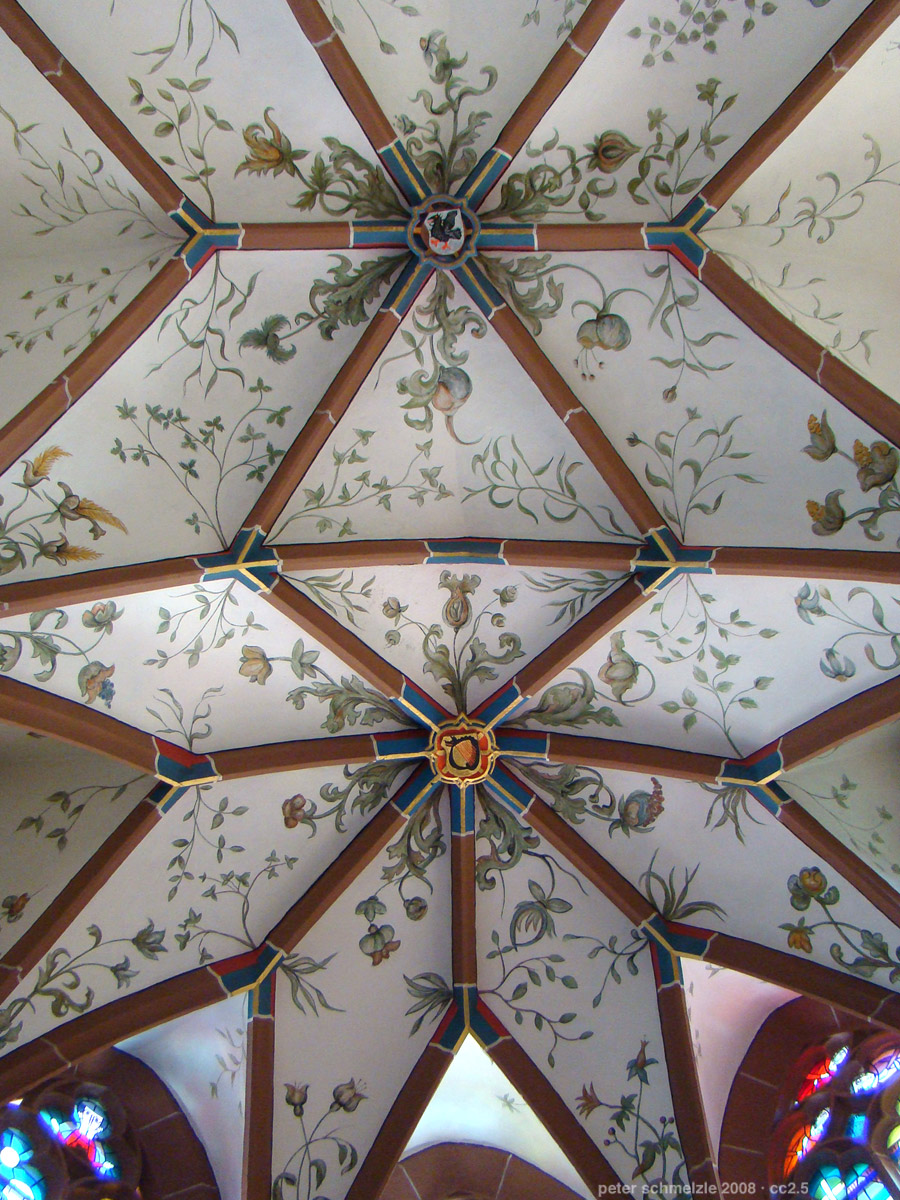
Quire vaulting

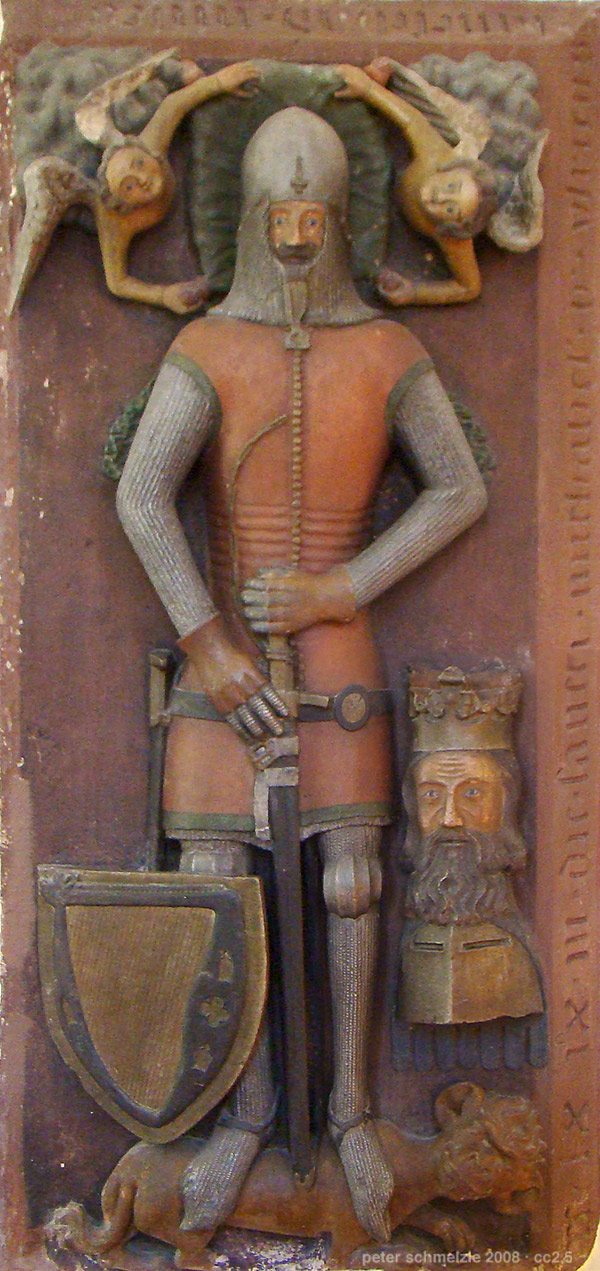
Landschad von Steinach grave marker

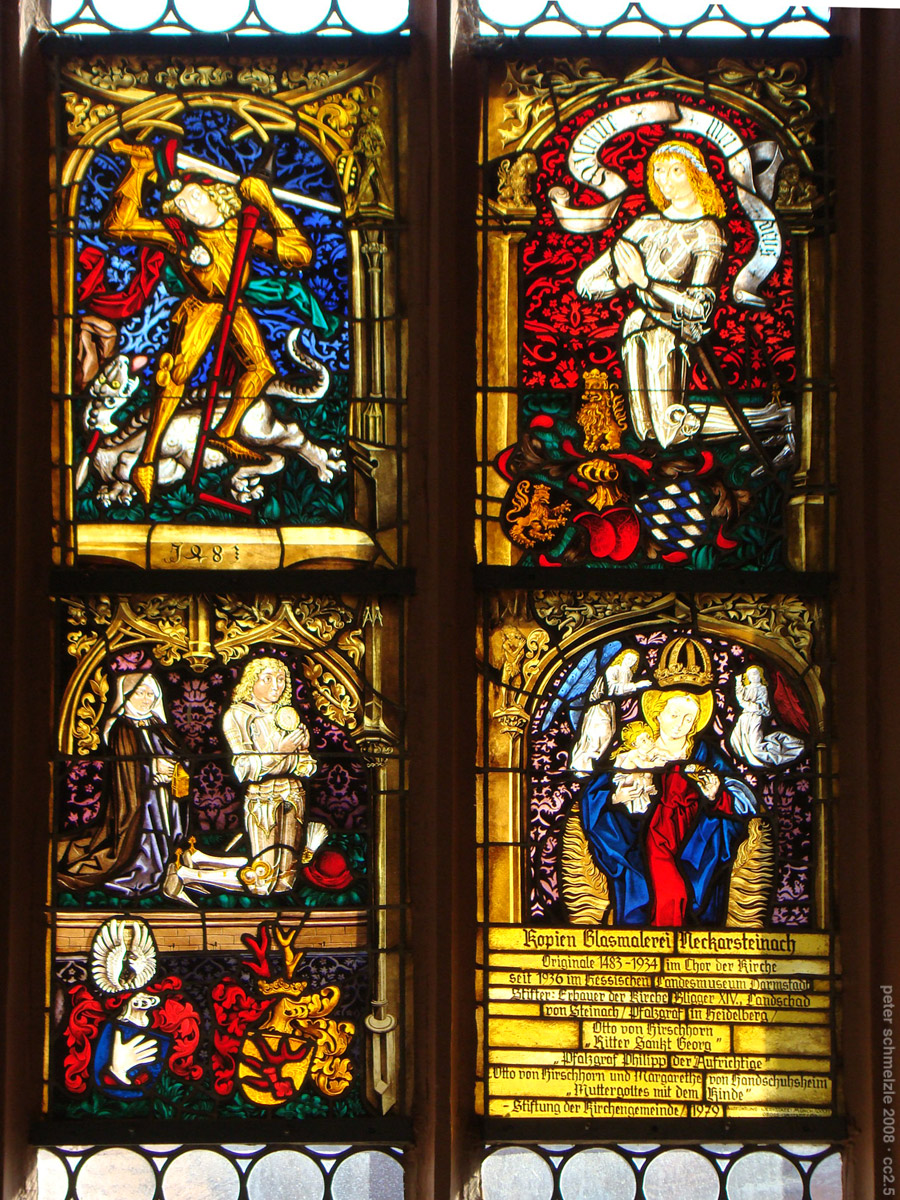
Window from 1483

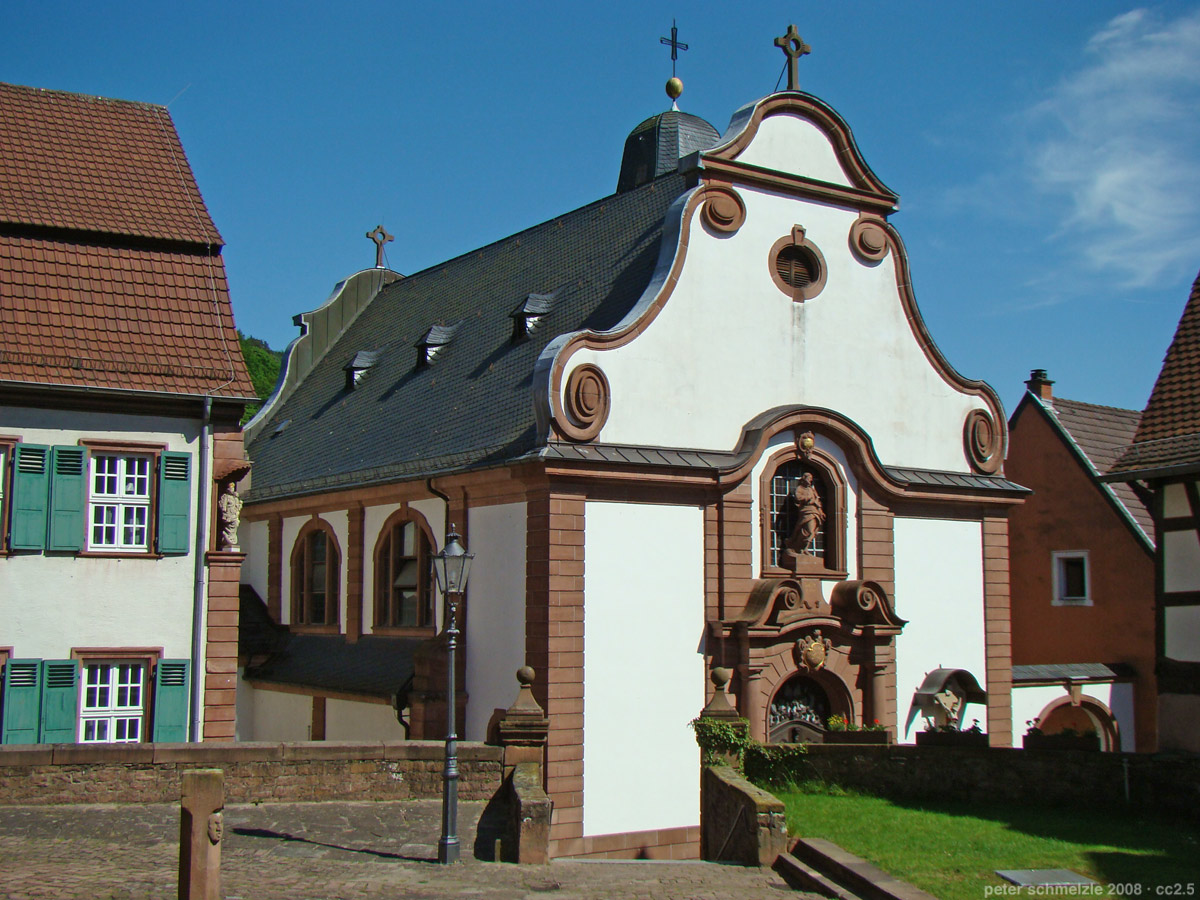
Catholic Herz-Jesu-Kirche

- The Catholic Herz-Jesu-Kirche (“Jesus’s Heart Church”) was built in Neo-Baroque style between 1906 and 1908 by Prof. Friedrich Pützer. The main altar from 1750 shows Saint Stephen in the middle and came originally from Saint Stephen's Church (Catholic) in Mainz-Gonsenheim. The side altars were originally in the church now used as an Evangelical church, but formerly as an interdenominational church before the Catholic Church was built, and date from 1711.
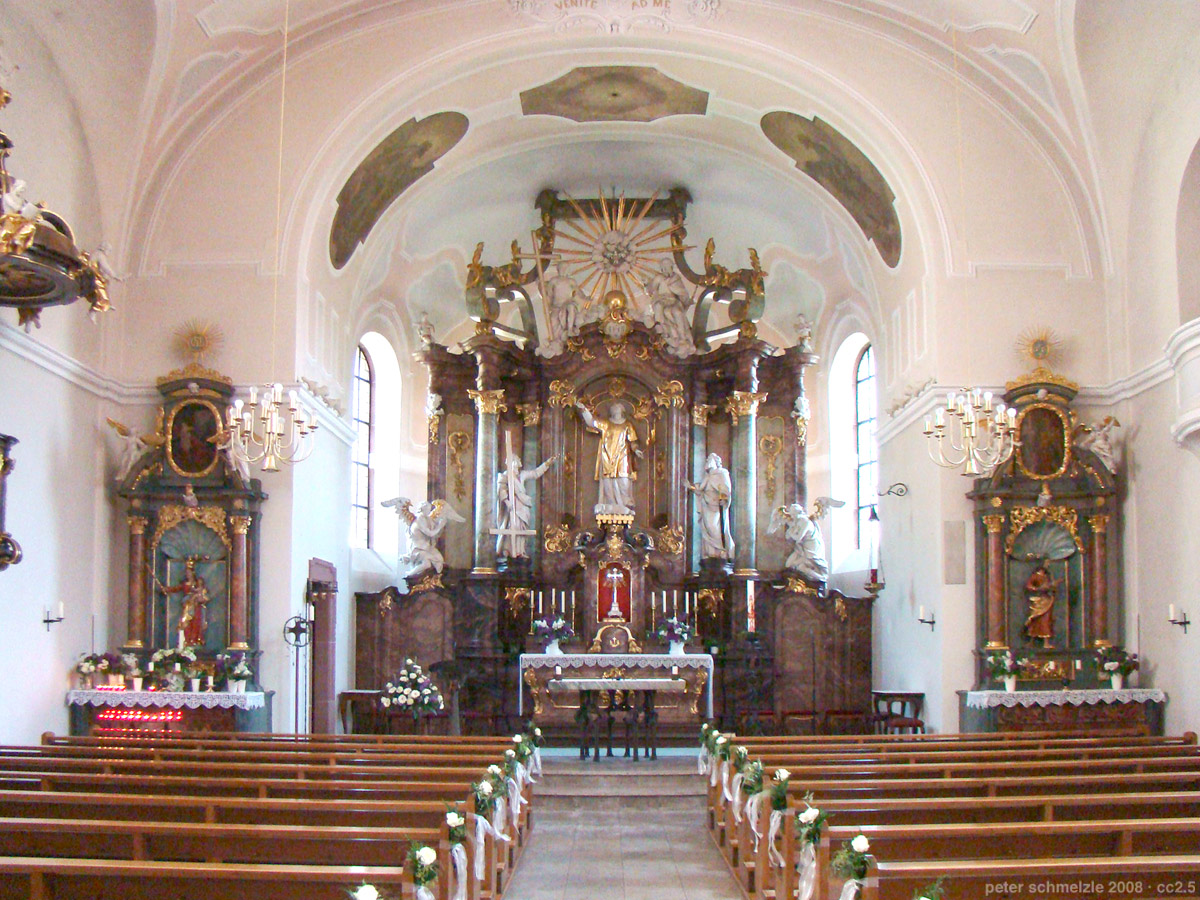
Inside view

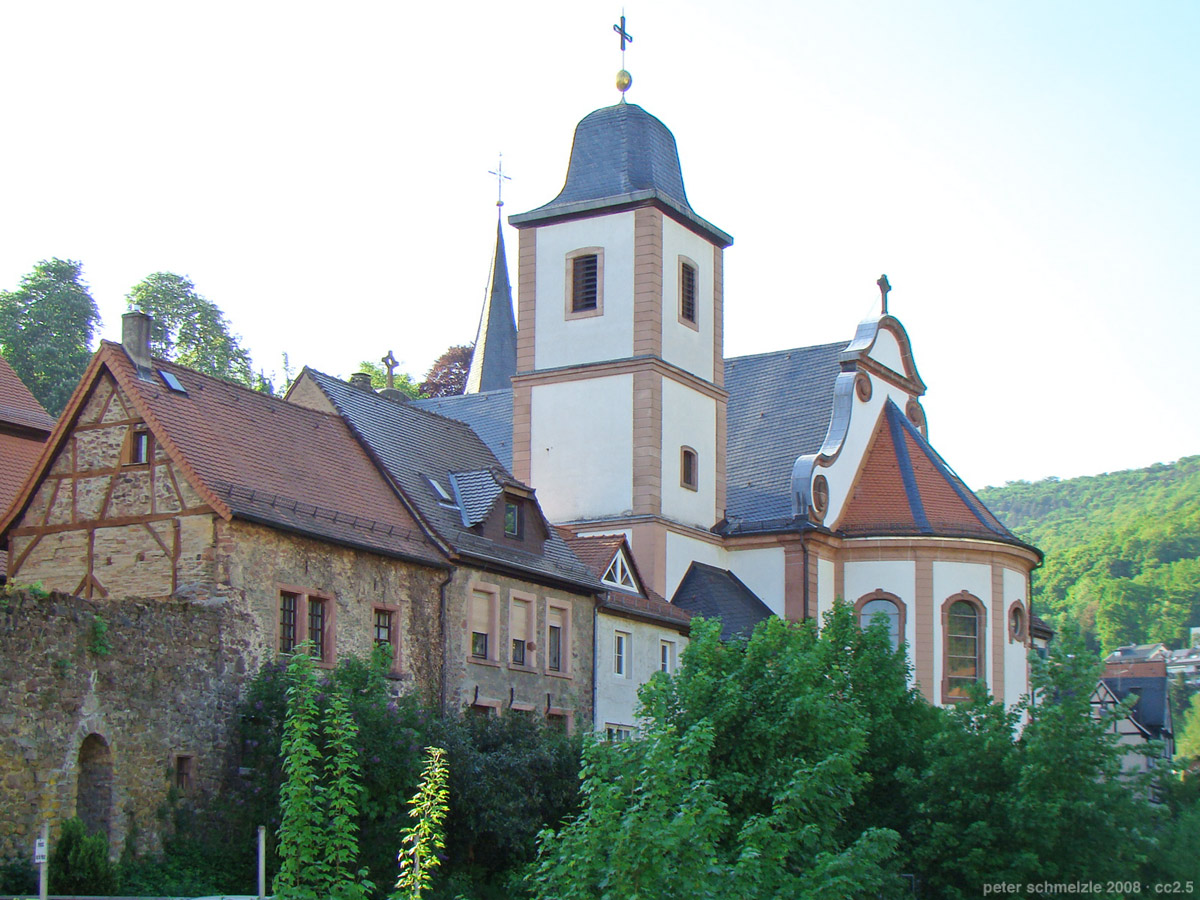
Herz-Jesu-Kirche from the southeast

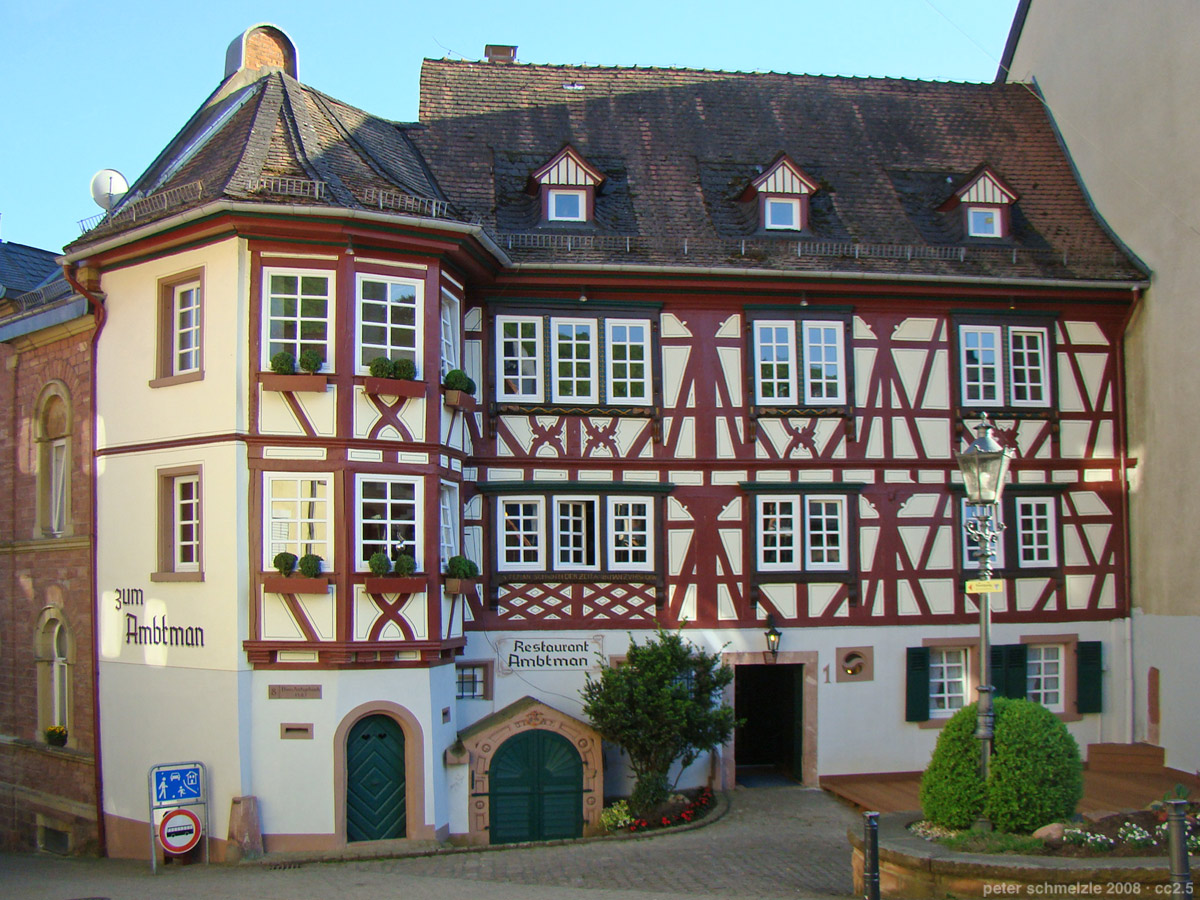
Old Amtshaus

- The town hall was built in 1861 and 1862 on the same site as the old one from the 16th century which had burnt down. The first town hall, from the 14th century, is believed to have stood elsewhere.
- Neckarsteinach has a wealth of historic buildings. Besides remains of the town wall from the 14th century, the mediaeval Bliggergasse (lane) can be named, as can the timber-frame house Ambtmann, the old synagogue on Hirschgasse and the historic timber-frame ensemble on Kirchenstraße. The lower town has been flooded many times, witnessing which are the high-water marks that can be seen on Hirschgasse. The highest flood came in 1824; the latest in 1993.
- In the outlying centre of Darsberg is found the historic Sebastianskapelle (“Sebastian’s chapel”).
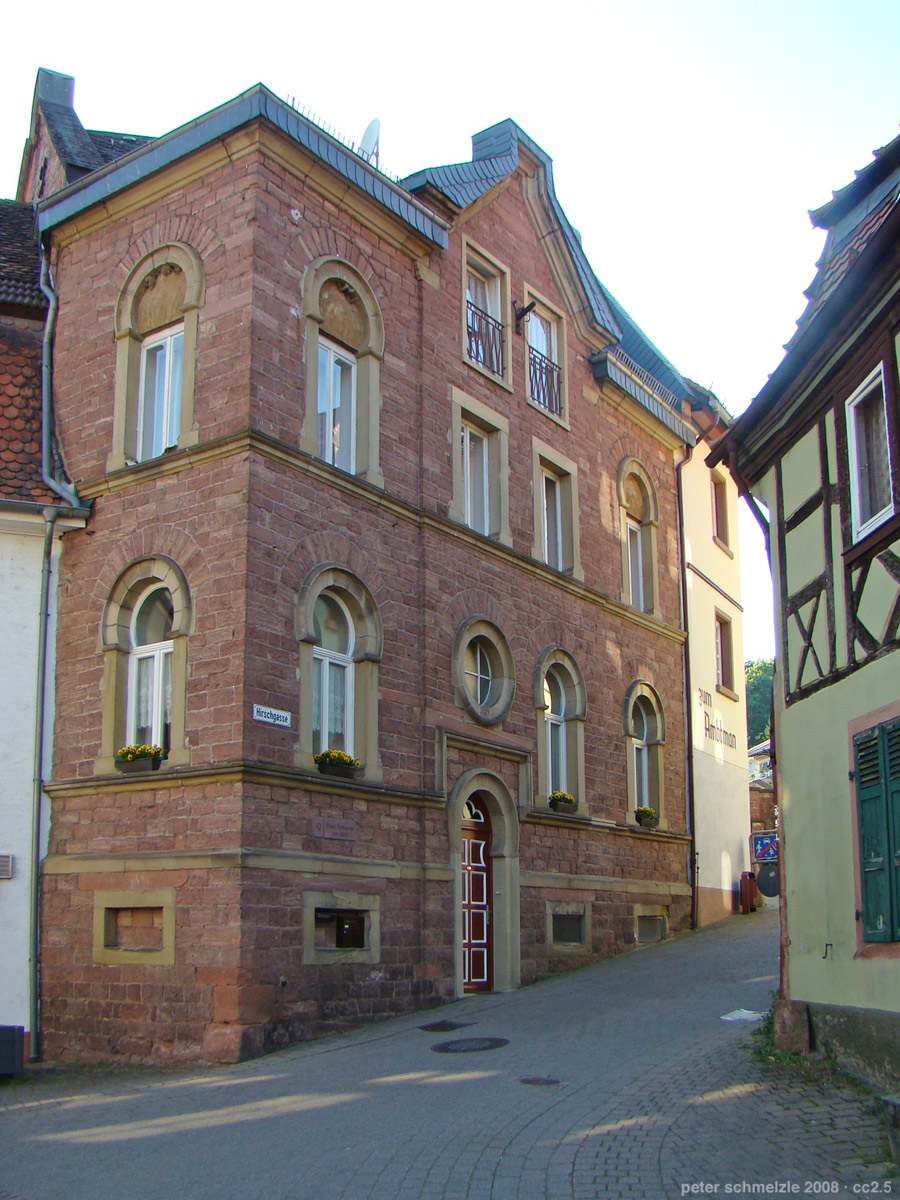
Old Synagogue

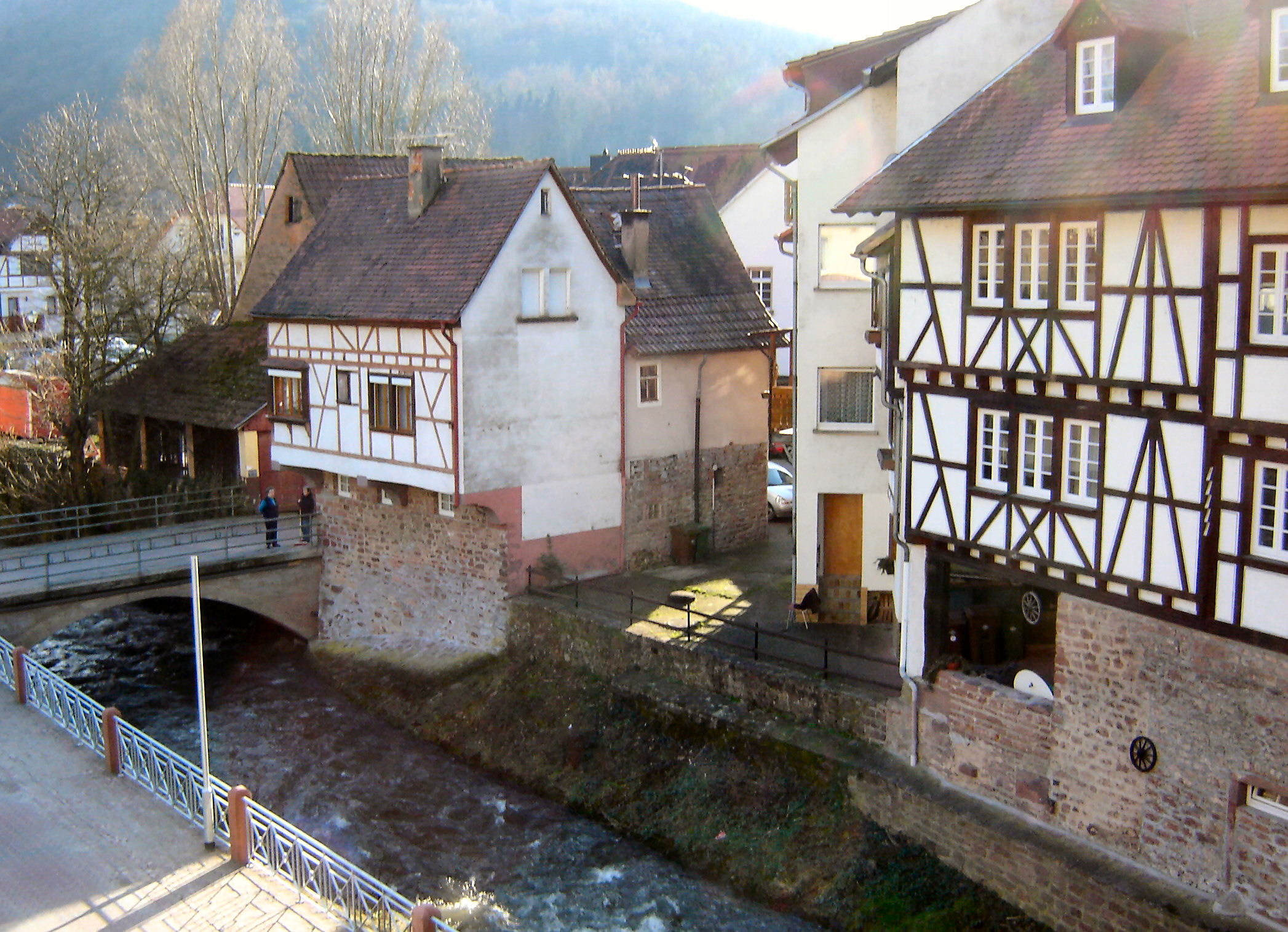
Section of the Steinach

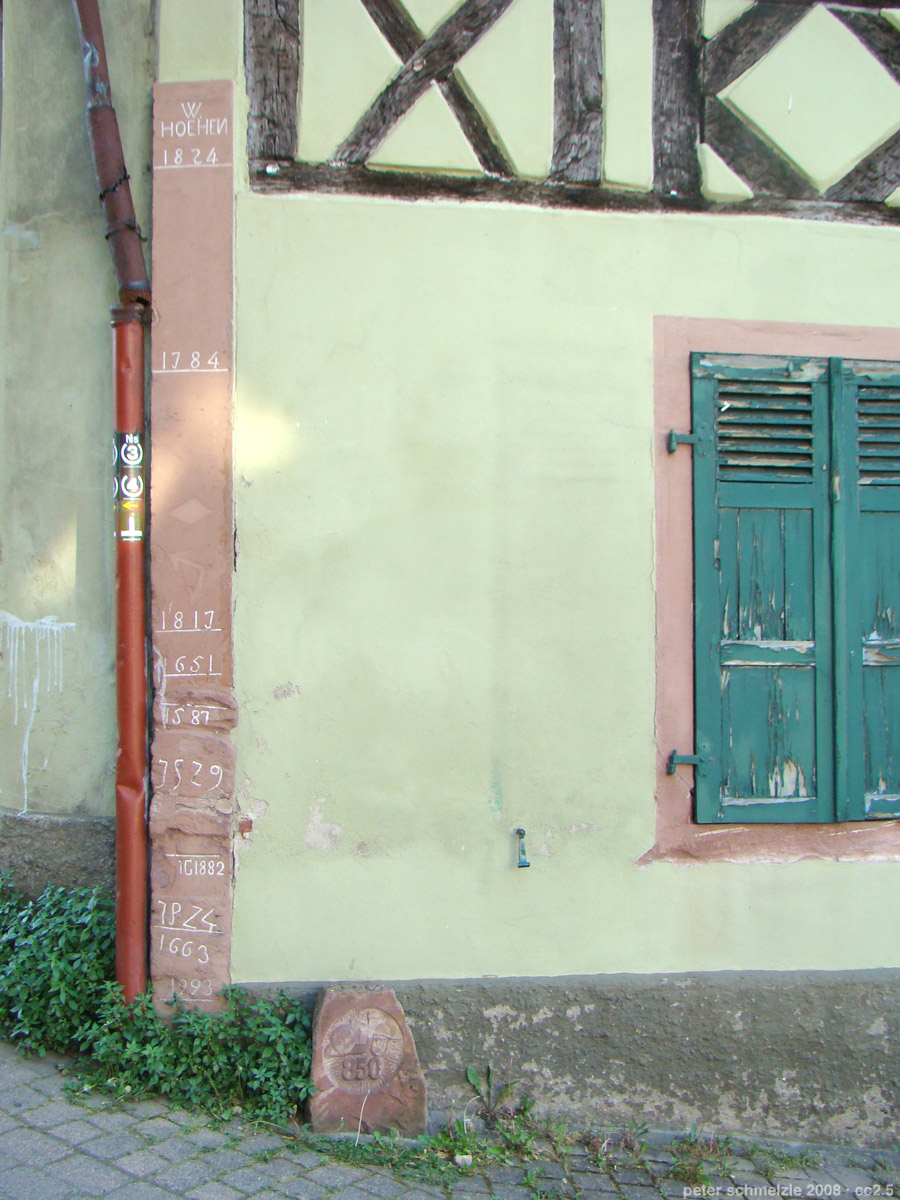
High-water marks

=== Park ===
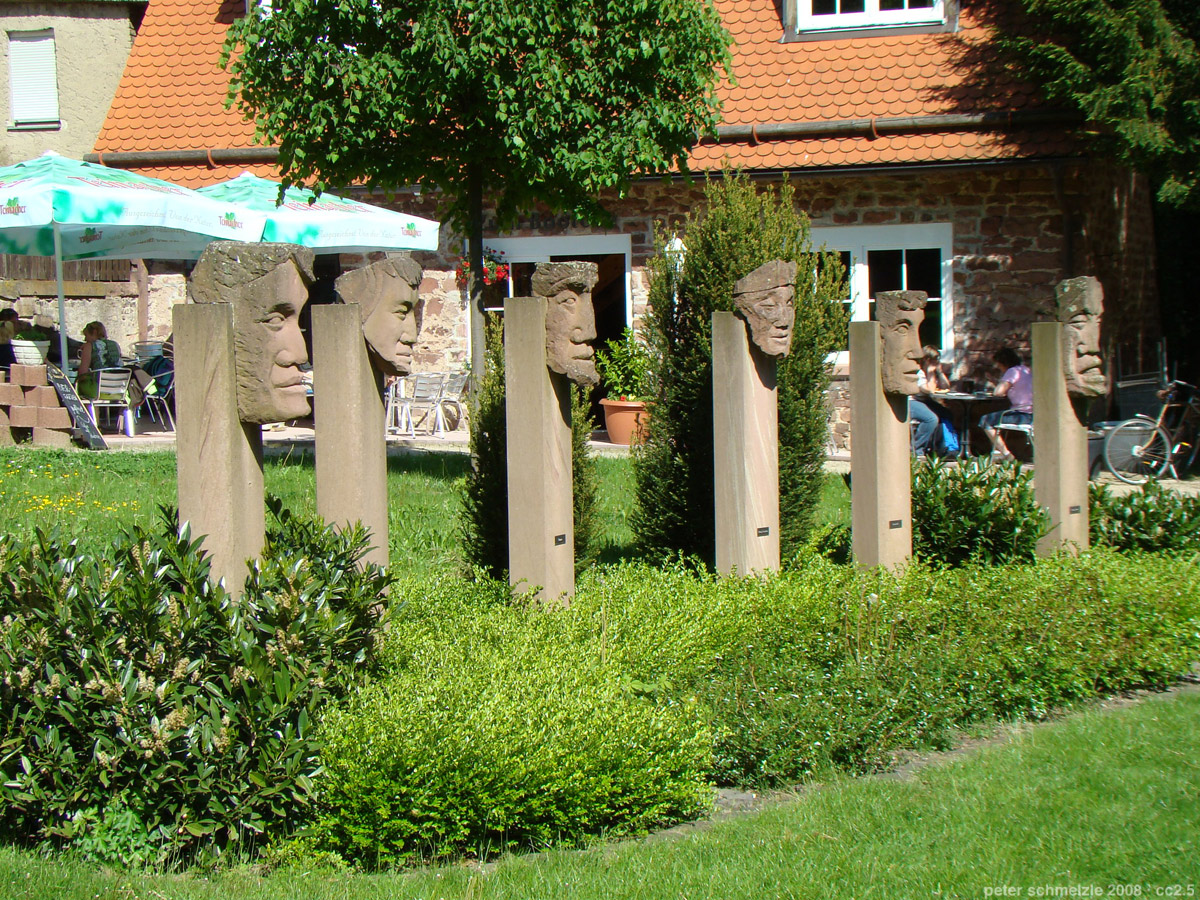
Sculptures in the Nibelungenpark

- Nibelungen-Park, remodelled in 1998 with sandstone sculptures by sculptor Paul August Wagner from the Seckach Sculpture Park.

=== Regular events ===
- On the first weekend in March, the Kleine Buchmesse im Neckartal (book fair) is held at the Bürgerhaus zum Schwanen (community centre).
- In the outlying centre of Darsberg on the Thursday during Carnival – known locally as Fastnacht – a witches’ parade is staged. To a witches’ dance and Guggenmusik, a Feuerrad – a “firewheel” made of straw – is rolled.
- A fortnight before Easter, the traditional Sommertagszug (“Summer Day Parade”) is held.
- A fortnight after Whitsun (the first Sunday after Trinity Sunday) comes the Kerwe (church consecration festival) with a baked-fish festival.
- On the last Saturday in July, Tag des Gastes (“Guest’s Day”) is celebrated with floodlighting on the four castles.
- On the first weekend in Advent, the Christmas Market is held in the lower Old Town.

== Economy and infrastructure ==
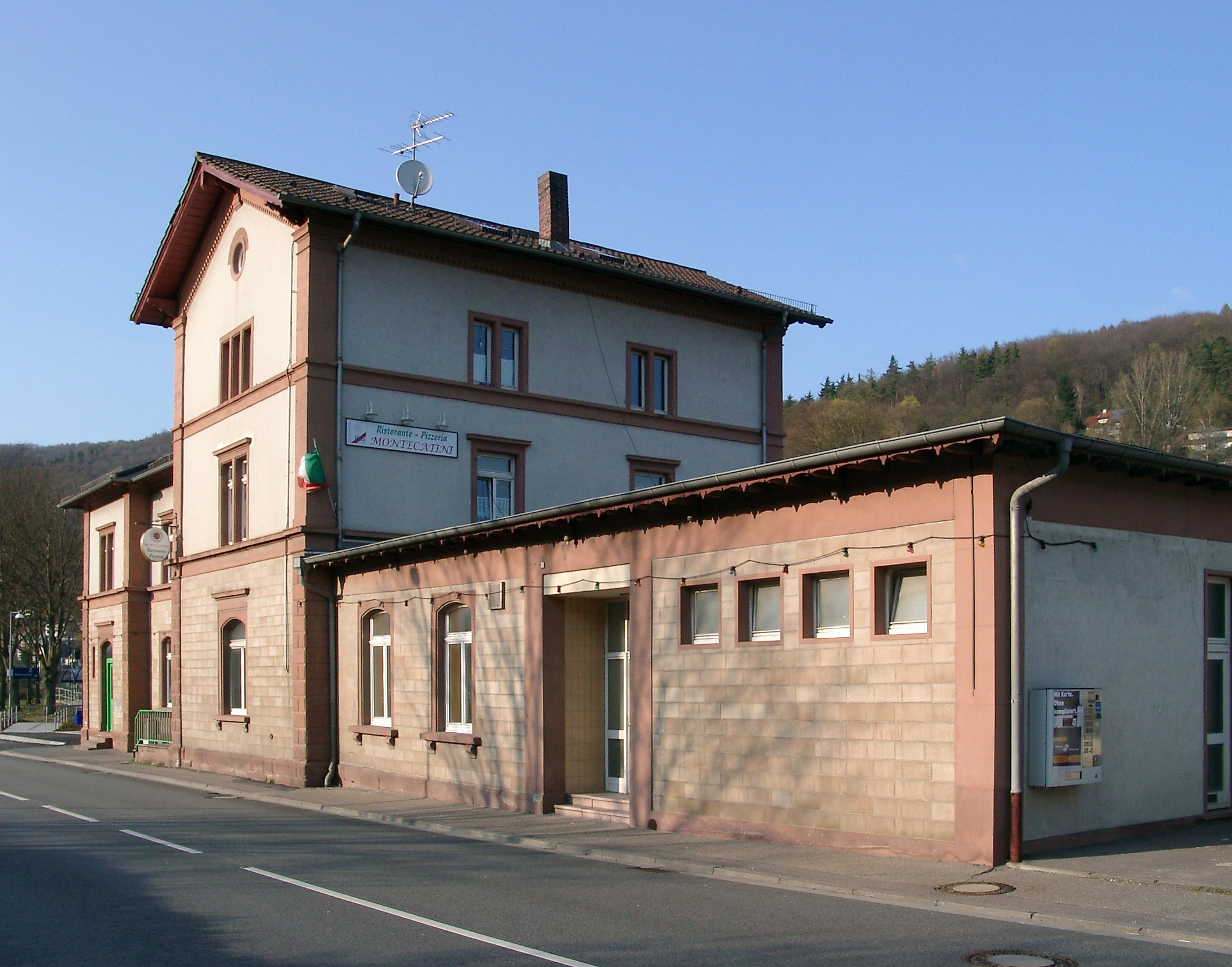
Railway station in Neckarsteinach

=== Transport ===
Neckarsteinach and the outlying centre of Neckarhausen lie on the Neckartalbahn opened in 1879 and running from Heidelberg by way of Mosbach to Bad Friedrichshall, and since 2003 also served half-hourly by the RheinNeckar S-Bahn’s Lines 1 and 2. Between 1928 and 1981 there was a spur running along the Steinach up to Schönau, but passenger service on it ended in 1969.

The predominant traffic artery today is Bundesstraße 37.

Route diagram of the RheinNeckar S-Bahn

=== Established businesses ===
Goods transport on the Neckar has a long tradition in town. There are still shipowner families.

Tourism is run on the Neckar between Heidelberg and Eberbach (and sometimes as far as Heilbronn). Many guesthouses and overnight operations earn a living this way.

=== Education ===
- Freiherr-vom-Stein-Schule, with primary school, Hauptschule and Realschule.

== Personalities ==
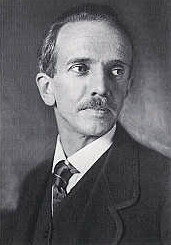
Otto Bartning 1920

- Bligger II of Steinach († after 1209), medieval minstrel
- Jakob Otter (1485-1547), Reformation theologian, first Lutheran priest of Neckarsteinach
- Otto Bartning (1883-1959), architect and church builder, lived for seven years in Neckarsteinach and planned the upper settlement for the expellees
- Valentin Peter Feuerstein (1917-1999), art painter and glass painter from Neckarsteinach
- Kai Herdling (born 1984), football player (TSG 1899 Hoffenheim, SV Waldhof Mannheim) grew up in Darsberg
