= Teltschik Tower =

Observation tower in Baden-Württemberg, Germany

Coordinates: 49°27′56″N 8°45′17″E

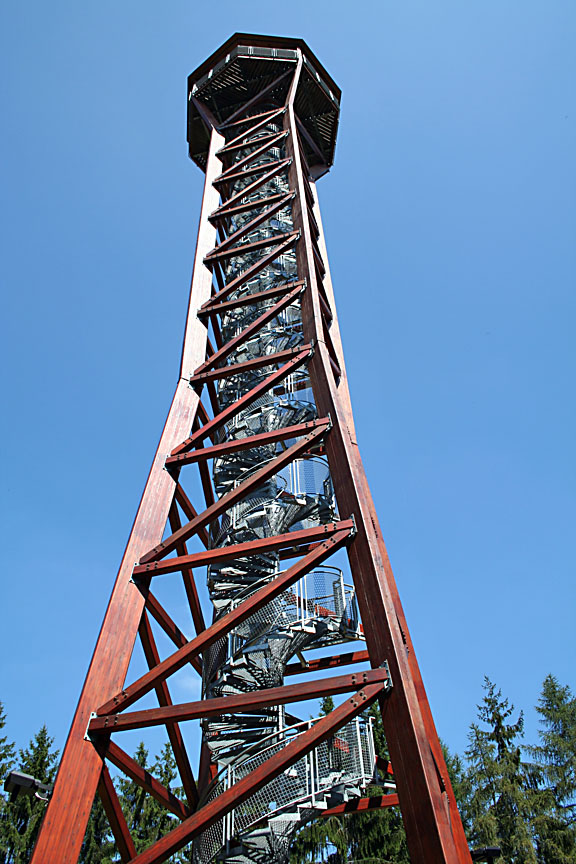
Teltschik Tower.

Teltschik Tower is a 41-metre-high observation tower built of wood in Wilhelmsfeld, Germany. There is a viewing platform at a height of 36 meters.

The tower was built by Walter Teltschik, a citizen of Wilhelmsfeld, in remembrance of his origins in the Kuhländchen near Brno, a part of the former Sudetenland (modern-day Czech Republic). From the top of the tower there is a view over the hills of the Odenwald (mountainous region in southern Germany) and as well to the Rhine Valley near Mannheim and the Black Forest.
