= Abtsteinach =

- Municipality
- Coat of arms

- Location of Abtsteinach within Bergstraße district
- Interactive map of Abtsteinach
- Location within Germany Location within Hesse
- Coordinates: 49°32′N 8°47′E
- Country: Germany
- State: Hesse
- Admin. region: Darmstadt
- District: Bergstraße

Government
  - Mayor (2017–23): Angelika Beckenbach

Area
  - Total: 11.03 km^{2} (4.26 sq mi)
- Elevation: 498 m (1,634 ft)

Population (2025-12-31)
  - Total: 2,393
  - Density: 217.0/km^{2} (561.9/sq mi)
- Time zone: UTC+01:00 (CET)
  - Summer (DST): UTC+02:00 (CEST)
- Postal codes: 69518
- Dialling codes: 06207
- Vehicle registration: HP
- Website: www.Absteinach.de

Abtsteinach is a municipality in the Bergstraße district in Hesse, Germany. The municipality calls itself “The Gateway to the Überwald”.

== Geography ==
=== Location ===
Ober-Abtsteinach lies among mountains in hilly country at 450 to 500 m above sea level. Unter-Abtsteinach and Mackenheim lie in neighbouring valleys going out from that.

In Abtsteinach rises the Steinach. The community lies among the mountains Hardberg, Waldskopf, Götzenstein and Hohberg.

=== Neighbouring communities ===
As part of the Überwald, Abtsteinach borders in the north on the community of Mörlenbach, in the east on the community of Wald-Michelbach, in the south on the community of Heiligkreuzsteinach (Rhein-Neckar-Kreis in Baden-Württemberg) and in the west on the communities of Gorxheimertal and Birkenau.

=== Constituent communities ===
Abtsteinach's Ortsteile are Mackenheim, Ober-Abtsteinach and Unter-Abtsteinach.

== History ==
In pre-Roman times, the Abtsteinach area was settled by Celts. In the Middle Ages, the area was held by the Lorsch Abbey. Expansion brought about by the second settlement drive led to the villages of Ober-Absteinach and Unter-Abtsteinach arising. In 1012, Abtsteinach had its first documentary mention as possesa steinah. In 1232, the Lorsch Abbey was dissolved by Emperor Friedrich II, and ownership of its holdings passed to the Archbishopric of Mainz.

In 1267, a Castle Count (Burggraf) at Starkenburg Castle (over Heppenheim), who also governed the Amt of Starkenburg, to which Abtsteinach belonged, is mentioned for the first time. As a result of the disastrous Mainz Episcopal Feud (Mainzer Stiftsfehde), the whole higher Amt of Starkenburg was pledged to Electoral Palatinate in 1461, and things remained so until 1623. From the year 1590 there comes a documentary mention that says that by then, Abtsteinach had long been a tithe court, giving it jurisdiction over several places, and obliging it to perform compulsory labour and military service. Through the abolition of the Electorate of Mainz in 1803, Abtsteinach passed to Hesse.

=== Religion ===
In each of Oberabtsteinach and Unterabtsteinach stands a Catholic church. There is moreover a chapel in Unterabtsteinach.

The church in Ober-Abtsteinach (St.Bonifatius) was built in the mid-17th century and a good hundred years later expanded. The high altar was built shortly after 1780.

St. Marien, the church in Unter-Abtsteinach, comes from the 20th century.

In the chapel in the middle of Unter-Abtsteinach stands a figure of Mary, which according to legend comes from the church ruins at Lichtenklingen.

Many houses in the greater community of Abtsteinach also have Muttergotteshäusel (“little Mother of God houses”), small niches in the houses’ outer walls with Mary or Christ figures.

== Politics ==
The municipal election held on 26 March 2006 yielded the following results:

Parties and voter communities		% 2006	Seats; 2006	% 2001	Seats; 2001
CDU	Christian Democratic Union of Germany	43.5	7	41.1	6
SPD	Social Democratic Party of Germany	19.9	3	24.5	4
FWV	Freie Wählervereinigung Abtsteinach	36.6	5	34.4	5
Total		100.0	15	100.0	15
Voter turnout in %		59.1		54.9	

=== Coat of arms ===
The community's arms might heraldically be described thus: Gules in base water wavy azure, thereupon a mount craggy argent, thereupon the crook of an abbot's staff with grape leaves of the last.

The arms are canting, with the abbot's staff suggesting the name Abtsteinach (Abt means “abbot” in German). Moreover, the abbot's staff refers to the community's link to the Lorsch Abbey, in whose ownership Abtsteinach once was (there was no abbey in Abtsteinach). The crag or mountain stands for the area's highest peak, the Hardberg, a defining landmark for Abtsteinach. The water symbolizes the local brook, the Steinach, which rises in Abtsteinach and flows down to the Neckar. The arms were conferred on the community on 21 December 1929, and since 1 January 1972, they have also been the greater community's arms.

== Public institutions ==
The town hall is to be found in Ober-Abtsteinach.

=== Education ===
The primary school is to be found in Unter-Abtsteinach and bears the name Steinachtal-Grundschule.

In Ober-Abtsteinach is found the St.Josef Catholic kindergarten.

=== Sport and leisure ===
A well groomed sporting ground can be found in Unter-Abtsteinach, and another in Ober-Abtsteinach.

A barbecue pavilion with an educational forest path can be found in Ober-Abtsteinach set among a meadow, a small wood and the community's graveyard.

== Culture and sightseeing ==
There is an artistic walk with eleven artworks leading from the FCO sporting ground by way of the barbecue pavilion to Götzensteinstraße.

== Economy and infrastructure ==
=== Transport ===
Abtsteinach lies off the greater Bundesstraßen, but is nevertheless easily reached over the linking roads from Weinheim to Wald-Michelbach.

=== Established businesses ===
- REIMOTEC Maschinen- und Anlagenbau GmbH (machine and facility building)
- motech gmbh, technology + systems, switchgear manufacturer
