= Sinsheim (electoral district) =

State electoral district of Germany

41: Sinsheim
- Electoral district for the Landtag of Baden-Württemberg
- Sinsheim in 2026
- District: Rhein-Neckar-Kreis
- Electorate: 98,052 (2026)
- Major settlements: Angelbachtal, Bammental, Eberbach, Epfenbach, Eschelbronn, Gaiberg, Heddesbach, Heiligkreuzsteinach, Helmstadt-Bargen, Lobbach, Mauer, Meckesheim, Neckarbischofsheim, Neckargemünd, Neidenstein, Reichartshausen, Schönau, Schönbrunn, Sinsheim, Spechbach, Waibstadt, Wiesenbach, Wilhelmsfeld, and Zuzenhausen

Current electoral district
- Party: CDU
- Member: Albrecht Schütte

Sinsheim is an electoral constituency (German: Wahlkreis) represented in the Landtag of Baden-Württemberg.

Since 2026, it has elected one member via first-past-the-post voting. Voters cast a second vote under which additional seats are allocated proportionally state-wide. Under the constituency numbering system, it is designated as constituency 41.

It is wholly within the district of Rhein-Neckar-Kreis.

== Geography ==
The constituency includes the municipalities of Angelbachtal, Bammental, Eberbach, Epfenbach, Eschelbronn, Gaiberg, Heddesbach, Heiligkreuzsteinach, Helmstadt-Bargen, Lobbach, Mauer, Meckesheim, Neckarbischofsheim, Neckargemünd, Neidenstein, Reichartshausen, Schönau, Schönbrunn, Sinsheim, Spechbach, Waibstadt, Wiesenbach, Wilhelmsfeld, and Zuzenhausen, within the district of Rhein-Neckar-Kreis.

There were 98,052 eligible voters in 2026.

== Members ==
=== First mandate ===
Both prior to and since the electoral reforms for the 2026 election, the winner of the plurality of the vote (first-past-the-post) in every constituency won the first mandate.

Election	Member	Party	%
1976	Gerhard Weiser	CDU	
1980	Gerhard Weiser	CDU	
1984	Gerhard Weiser	CDU	
1988	Gerhard Weiser	CDU	
1992	Gerhard Weiser	CDU	
1996	Gerhard Weiser	CDU	
2001	Elke Brunnemer	CDU	44.2
2006	Elke Brunnemer	CDU	43.6
2011	Elke Brunnemer	CDU	38.3
2016	Hermann Katzenstein	Grüne	26.8
2021	Hermann Katzenstein	Grüne	29.3
2026	Albrecht Schütte	CDU	33.2

=== Second mandate ===
Prior to the electoral reforms for the 2026 election, the seats in the state parliament were allocated proportionately amongst parties which received more than 5% of valid votes across the state. The seats that were won proportionally for parties that did not win as many first mandates as seats they were entitled to, were allocated to their candidates which received the highest proportion of the vote in their respective constituencies. This meant that following some elections, a constituency would have one or more members elected under a second mandate.

Prior to 2011, these second mandates were allocated to the party candidates who got the greatest number of votes, whilst from 2011-2021, these were allocated according to percentage share of the vote.

Election	Member	Party	Member	Party
1976	Udo Kraus	SPD		
1980	Brigitte Adler	SPD		
1984	Brigitte Adler	SPD		
Fen 1987	Helmut Göschel	SPD		
1988	Helmut Göschel	SPD		
1992	Helmut Göschel	SPD		
1996	Helmut Göschel	SPD		
2001	Helmut Göschel	SPD		
2006				
2011	Thomas Funk	SPD	Charlotte Schneiderwind-Hartnagel	Grüne
2016			Albrecht Schütte	CDU
2021	Jan-Peter Röderer	SPD	Albrecht Schütte	CDU

== Election results ==
=== 2026 election ===
State election (2026): Sinsheim
Notes:	Blue background denotes the winner of the electorate vote. Pink background denotes a candidate elected from their party list. Yellow background denotes an electorate win by a list member, or other incumbent. A ✓ or ✗ denotes status of any incumbent, win or lose respectively.						
Party	Candidate	Votes	%	±%	Party votes	%	±%
CDU	Albrecht Schütte	22,807	33.2	▲7.4	20,013	29.1	▲3.2
Greens	✗ Hermann Katzenstein	13,888	20.2	▼9.1	18,188	26.4	▼2.8
AfD	Patrick Bauer	13,840	20.2	▲9.2	14,041	20.4	9.4
SPD	Jan-Peter Röderer	8,436	12.3	▼1.5	5,886	8.6	▼5.2
FW	Alexander Speer	3,374	4.9	▲1.8	1,841	2.7	▼0.4
Left	Nicola Vallon	3,033	4.4	▲1.6	2,708	3.9	▲1.1
FDP	Olaf Hautzinger	2,094	3.0	▼6.1	2,510	3.6	▼5.5
BSW					901	1.3	
APT					717	1.0	
Volt	Lion Budraß	813	1.2	▲0.4	674	1.0	▲0.1
PARTEI					321	0.5	
Bündnis C	Ralf Maier	387	0.6	Steady	260	0.4	▼0.2
dieBasis					150	0.2	▼0.6
Pensioners					128	0.2	
Values					120	0.2	
ÖDP					76	0.1	▼0.8
Team Todenhöfer					71	0.1	
Verjüngungsforschung					52	0.1	
PdF					48	0.1	
KlimalisteBW					39	0.1	▼0.7
Humanists					33	0.0	
Informal votes		613			508		
Total valid votes		68,672			68,777		
Turnout		69,285	70.7	▲7.2			
CDU gain from Greens	Majority	8,919	13.0				

=== 2021 election ===
State election (2021): Sinsheim
Party	Candidate	Votes	%	±%
Greens	Hermann Katzenstein	17,754	29.3	▲2.5
CDU	Albrecht Schütte	15,682	25.9	▼0.7
SPD	Jan-Peter Röderer	8,369	13.8	▼1.2
AfD	Dieter Amann	6,662	11.0	▼7.0
FDP	Michael Westram	5,536	9.1	▲1.4
FW	Kay-Olaf Ballerstädt	1,891	3.1	
Left	Marco La Licata	1,733	2.9	▲0.2
WiR2020	Marcus Müller	636	1.0	
ÖDP	Denis Maier	543	0.9	Steady
dieBasis	Xenia Pompe	518	0.9	
Volt	Leon Wollmann	505	0.8	
KlimalisteBW	Johanna Legnar	443	0.7	
Bündnis C	Angelika Matscheko	368	0.6	
Majority		2,072	3.4	
Rejected ballots		567	0.9	▼0.2
Turnout		61,207	63.4	▼7.7
Registered electors		96,488		
Greens hold		Swing		

== See also ==
- Politics of Baden-Württemberg
- Landtag of Baden-Württemberg
