= Volksbank Neckartal =

German cooperative bank (e. 1856)

Coordinates: 49.46431°N 8.98464°E

Volksbank Neckartal eG
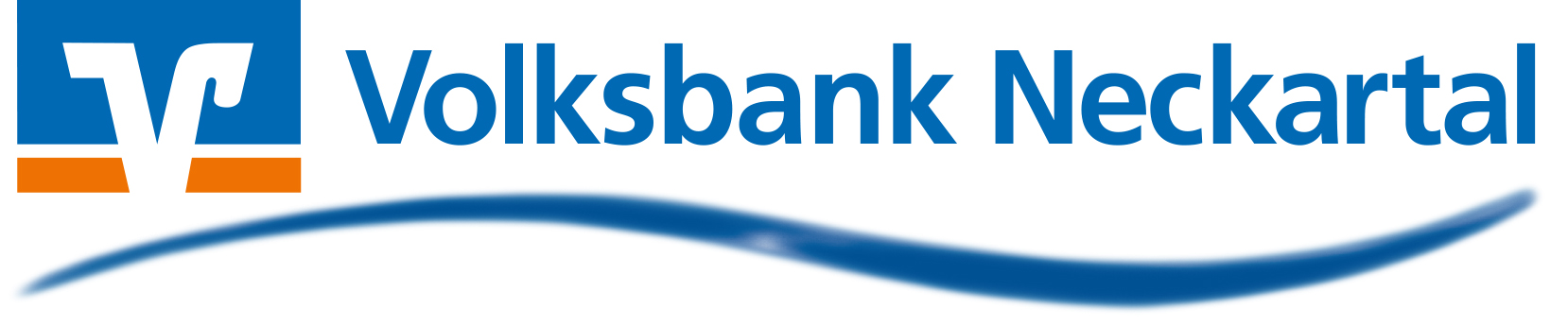
- Company type: Registered cooperative society
- Industry: Cooperative bank
- Founded: 1856
- Headquarters: Eberbach, Germany
- Total assets: €2.11 billion (2018)
- Members: 46,258 (2018)
- Number of employees: 360 (2018)
- Parent: Bundesverband der Deutschen Volksbanken und Raiffeisenbanken
- Website: www.volksbank-neckartal.de

The Volksbank Neckartal eG is a German cooperative bank headquartered in Eberbach.

== History ==
In 1865 a small circle of liberal thinking Eberbacher citizens who were connected to the idea of self-help founded the Vorschussverein Eberbach (advance association) based on the model of the co-operative founding fathers Friedrich Wilhelm Raiffeisen and Franz Hermann Schulze-Delitzsch. Three years later, the Vorschussverein Neckargemünd was founded. Both advance associations are predecessor institutions of today's Volksbank Neckartal.

In 2001, Volksbank Eberbach-Hessisches Neckartal merged with Volksbank Neckargemünd-Meckesheim, which emerged from the merger of Volksbank Neckargemünd and Volksbank Meckesheim in 1998, to form Volksbank Neckartal. In 2009, the merger took place between Volksbank Neckartal and Volksbank Schwarzbachtal.

== Structure ==
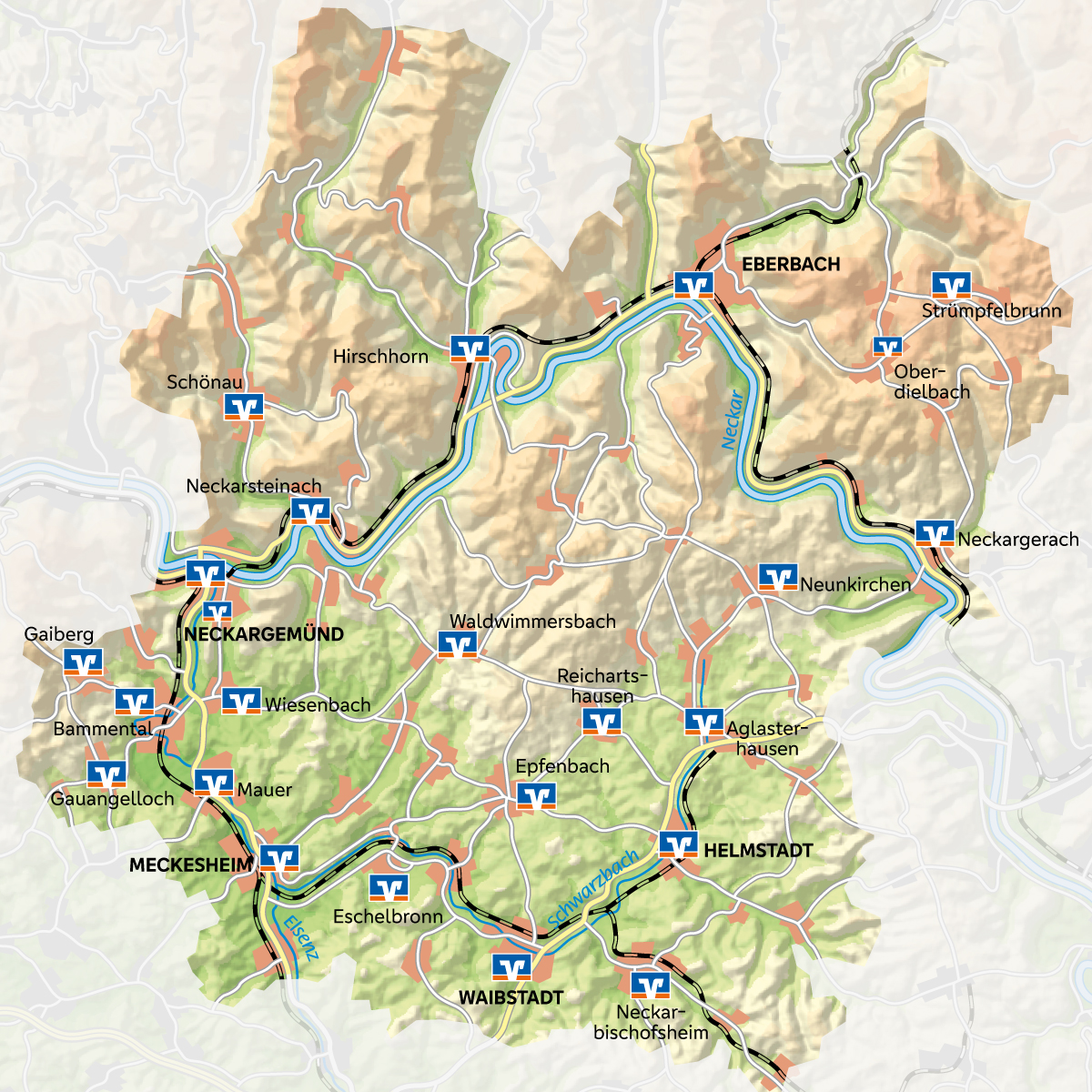
Servicemap of Volksbank Neckartal eG

Volksbank Neckartal eG has 34 offices in its business area and has 373 employees. With 46,015 members, Volksbank Neckartal eG is the largest association of individuals in the region. Via the Representatives' Meeting and Supervisory Board these members, in accordance with the Cooperatives Act and the Articles of Association, determine the bank's business policy. In addition to the bank's own products and services, the Volksbank Neckartal eG also offers services from the cooperative financial group (Bausparkasse Schwäbisch Hall, R+V Versicherung, Union Investment, DZ Bank, VR Leasing and the cooperative mortgage banks).

Main offices are in:

- Eberbach
- Helmstadt
- Meckenheim
- Neckargemünd
- Waibstadt

Business offices are located in:

- Aglasterhausen
- Bammental
- Dilsberg
- Eberbach-Nord
- Epfenbach
- Eschelbronn
- Gaiberg
- Gauangelloch
- Hirschhorn
- Lobenfeld
- Wall
- Mückenloch
- Münzenbach
- Neckarbischofsheim
- Neckargerach
- Neckarsteinach
- Neunkirchen
- Reichartshausen
- Schönau
- Schönbrunn
- Spechbach
- Strümpfelbrunn
- Waldwimmersbach
- Wiesenbach
- Zuzenhausen
- Self-Service Neidenstein
- Self-Service Eberbach Neuer Markt
- Self-Service Mönchzell
- Self-Service Oberdielbach

== See also ==
- List of banks in Germany
