= Waibstadt =

- Town
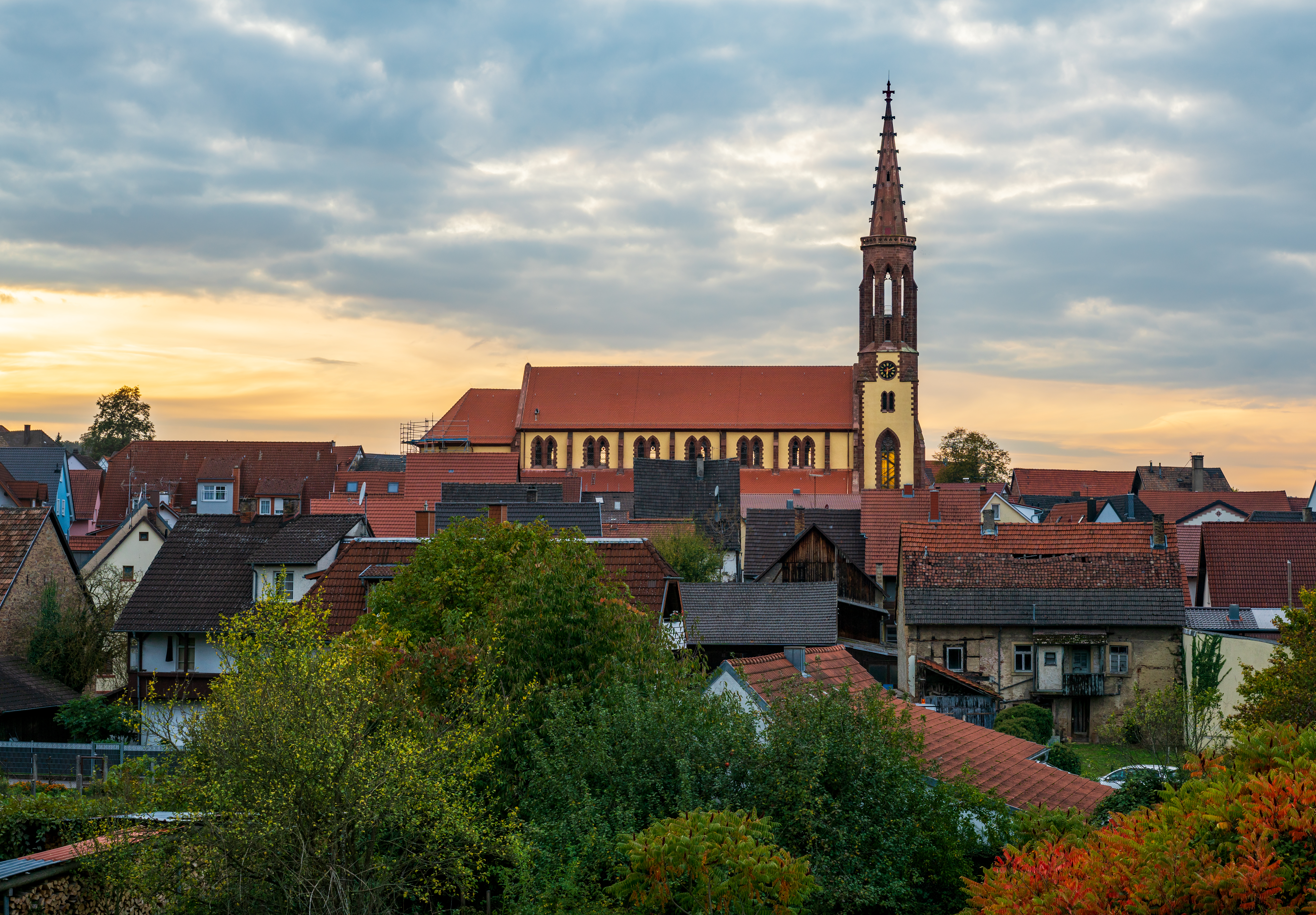
- Waibstadt at sunset

- Coat of arms

- Location of Waibstadt within Rhein-Neckar-Kreis district
- Interactive map of Waibstadt
- Location within Germany Location within Baden-Württemberg
- Coordinates: 49°17′51″N 08°55′12″E
- Country: Germany
- State: Baden-Württemberg
- Admin. region: Karlsruhe
- District: Rhein-Neckar-Kreis
- Subdivisions: 3: Waibstadt (Main Town), Daisbach, Bernau

Government
  - Mayor (2017–25): Joachim Locher

Area
  - Total: 25.57 km^{2} (9.87 sq mi)
- Elevation: 172 m (564 ft)

Population (2025-12-31)
  - Total: 5,849
  - Density: 228.7/km^{2} (592.4/sq mi)
- Time zone: UTC+01:00 (CET)
  - Summer (DST): UTC+02:00 (CEST)
- Postal codes: 74915
- Dialling codes: 07263
- Vehicle registration: HD
- Website: www.waibstadt.de

Waibstadt (German pronunciation: [ˈvaɪpʃtat]; Palatine German: Waibschd) is a town in the district of Rhein-Neckar-Kreis, in Baden-Württemberg, Germany.

It belongs to the municipal administration union "Waibstadt", which consists of Epfenbach, Helmstadt-Bargen, Neckarbischofsheim, Neidenstein, Reichartshausen and Waibstadt itself. Furthermore, it is part of the touristic region Brunnenregion.

== Geography ==
=== Geographic location ===
Waibstadt is located in the valley of the Schwarzbach in the northern Kraichgau, about 25 km southeast of Heidelberg and about 6 km north of Sinsheim.

=== Neighbour municipalities ===
The town is surrounded in the northwest by Neidenstein, in the north by Epfenbach, in the northeast by Helmstadt-Bargen, in the east by Neckarbischofsheim, in the south by Sinsheim and in the west by Zuzenhausen and Eschelbronn.

=== Parts of town ===
Besides the main town Waibstadt, the two villages Daisbach and Bernau are part of Waibstadt.

== History ==
The first documented mentioning date at 795 AD, but there are indications, that at the same place there was a Roman settlement.
