= Spechbach, Baden-Württemberg =

- Municipality
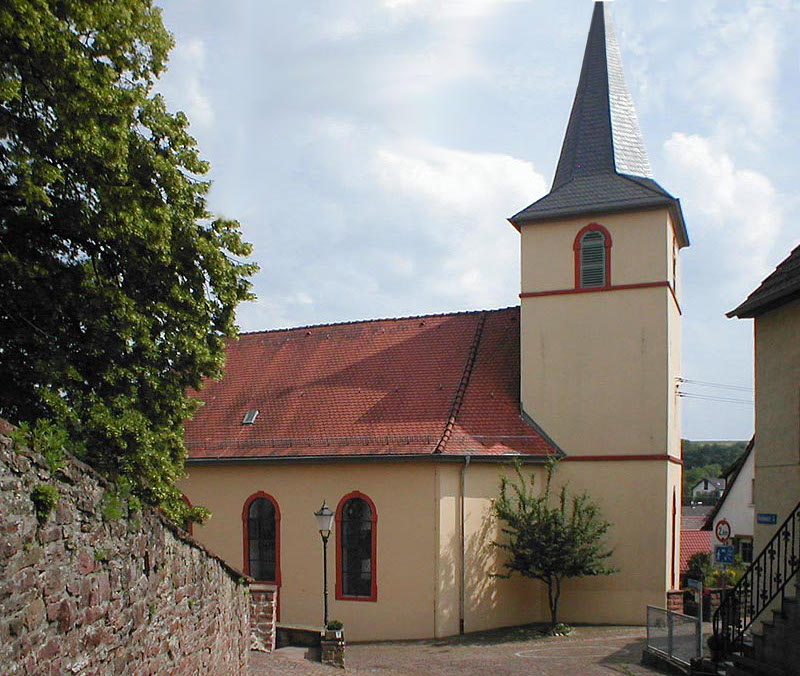
- Protestant Church

- Coat of arms

- Location of Spechbach, Baden-Württemberg within Rhein-Neckar-Kreis district
- Interactive map of Spechbach, Baden-Württemberg
- Location within Germany Location within Baden-Württemberg
- Coordinates: 49°20′46″N 08°53′04″E
- Country: Germany
- State: Baden-Württemberg
- Admin. region: Karlsruhe
- District: Rhein-Neckar-Kreis

Government
  - Mayor (2020–28): Werner Braun

Area
  - Total: 8.52 km^{2} (3.29 sq mi)
- Elevation: 197 m (646 ft)

Population (2025-12-31)
  - Total: 1,761
  - Density: 207/km^{2} (535/sq mi)
- Time zone: UTC+01:00 (CET)
  - Summer (DST): UTC+02:00 (CEST)
- Postal codes: 74937
- Dialling codes: 06226
- Vehicle registration: HD
- Website: www.spechbach.de

Spechbach is a town in the district of Rhein-Neckar in Baden-Württemberg in Germany.

== Geography ==
=== Geographical location ===
Spechbach is located on the border between the Kleiner Odenwald and Kraichgau, 21 km southeast of Heidelberg, between Heidelberg, Sinsheim and Mosbach. The district of Spechbach essentially comprises the Spechbachtal of the same name as well as the ridges on both sides and lies at an altitude of about 160 to 330 meters.

=== Neighboring communities ===
The community borders on Epfenbach in the east, on Neidenstein in the south-east, on Eschelbronn in the south, on Meckesheim in the south-west and on Lobbach in the west and north. The municipality is a member municipality in the municipality administration association Elsenztal, the seat of which is the municipality of Meckesheim.

== History ==
Under the Roman Empire, the area was occupied by a settlement, likely of Celtic origin, known as Vicus Nediensis, which served as a farmyard behind the Limes. There is no evidence of the Roman settlement after the Third Century, so the area was probably not resettled until the time of the Carolingian Empire.

The modern settlement of Spechbach developed on the lower right-hand slope of the Spechbach valley. The place was first mentioned in 1246 with the naming of a Heidelberg citizen "Conradus de Spehbach". The place name is probably derived from Specht. The place initially belonged to the Staufer empire around Wimpfen and came under Palatinate suzerainty with the Meckesheimer Zent in 1330. The Lords of Weinsberg, in 1401 the Neidenstein branch of the Lords of Venningen, and later also the Lords of Helmstatt, the Landschad von Steinach, appeared as local lords on the occasion of an inheritance division. the Freiherrn von Zandt, the family von Üxküll and others, whereby the Venningen had the dominant influence in the place until the mediatization of the imperial knighthood, although there were also several local lords at times.

In the 15th and 16th centuries, a distinction was made between Großspechbach and Kleinspechbach, the latter essentially consisting of a mill at Lobbach and was devastated in the Thirty Years War. Spechbach was initially a street village with farmsteads along the main street and the church with a walled cemetery above it. There were 33 Fallgüter in the village, but they were already severely divided by the late 18th century. The whole place was initially laid out on manorial land. From 1838 the Venningen house sites were released into rural property. The growth in the 19th century mainly led to a further densification of the town center, while only along the road to Lobenfeld was another residential area. The other new development areas of the place were not developed until after 1951.

Spechbach belonged to the Palatinate Amt Dilsberg until 1803, then to the Baden District Office Neckargemünd. The manor also had its own Amt in Eichtersheim from 1807 to 1813. In 1857 Spechbach came to the Baden District Office Eberbach, in 1863 to the District Office Heidelberg, with which it passed in 1938 to the District of Heidelberg and in 1973 to the Rhein-Neckar-Kreis.

== Politics ==
=== Administrative association ===
The community belongs to the local administration association Elsenztal with seat in Meckesheim.

=== Municipal Council ===
The local council in Spechbach has ten members. The local council consists of the elected voluntary councilors and the mayor as chairman. The mayor is entitled to vote in the municipal council.

=== Coat of arms ===
The blazon of the coat of arms reads: A black woodpecker sitting in silver on a blue wavy beam, above it two diagonally crossed red lilies.

The coat of arms goes back to a court seal from 1705. It was designed in 1921 by the Generallandesarchiv Karlsruhe. The woodpecker symbolizes the place name while speaking. The Lilienstaves come from the coat of arms of the Lords of Venningen, who had shares in the local government since 1401.

The flag is blue and white and was awarded by the Rhein-Neckar-Kreis district office in 1981.

== Tourist Attractions ==
The center of Spechbach is characterized by the neighboring Protestant and Catholic churches. The Catholic Church of St. Martin is the older of the two churches and goes back to a St. Martin's Church that already existed in the Middle Ages. The church was reformed in 1561, used from 1699 as a Simultankirche and in 1707 again given to the Catholics in the course of the Church division. A new nave was built in 1767 and extended to the west in 1828. On the outer wall is the ornate tombstone of Victor Kirchgessner (1830–1898), pastor in Weingarten and Walstetten, from 1880 in Spechbach. The Protestant church was built in 1776. In the town center, on the site of a previous building, there is also the historic town hall built in 1865 and renovated in 1964, the Catholic parish hall from 1912 as well as several half-timbered houses and historic inns such as the Gasthof Sonne from 1796. Spechbach also has a Roman fountain, reminiscent of the Römerstrasse from Ladenburg to the Roman Limes border town Osterburken. However, almost nothing of the actual ground monument can be seen without professional guidance.

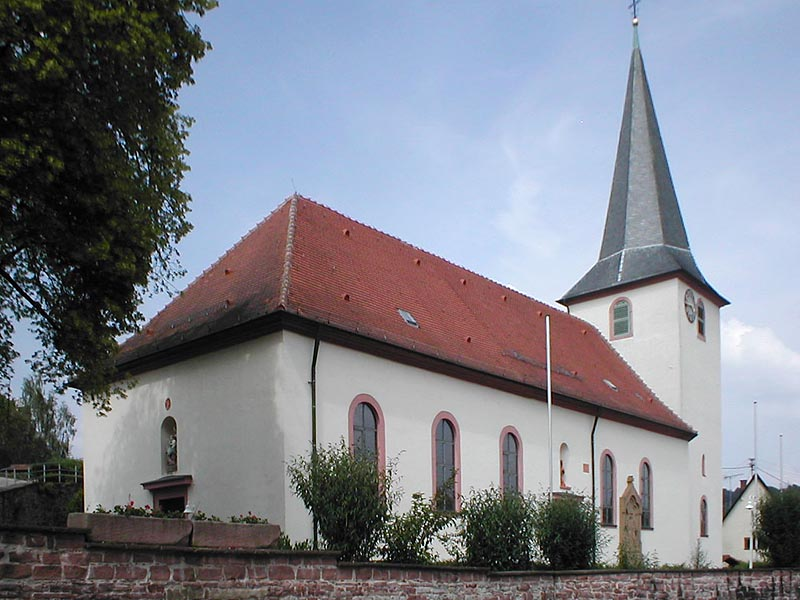
Kath. church

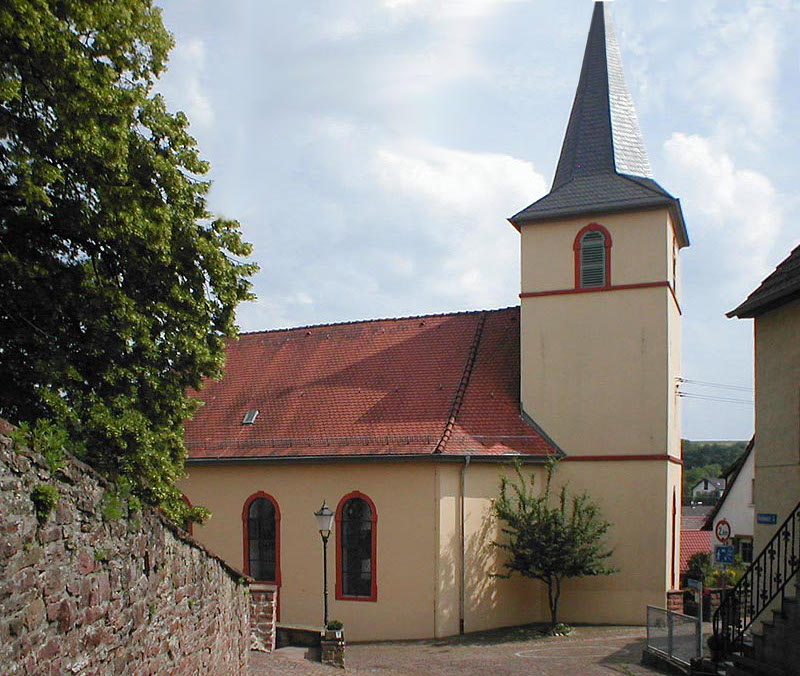
Evang. church

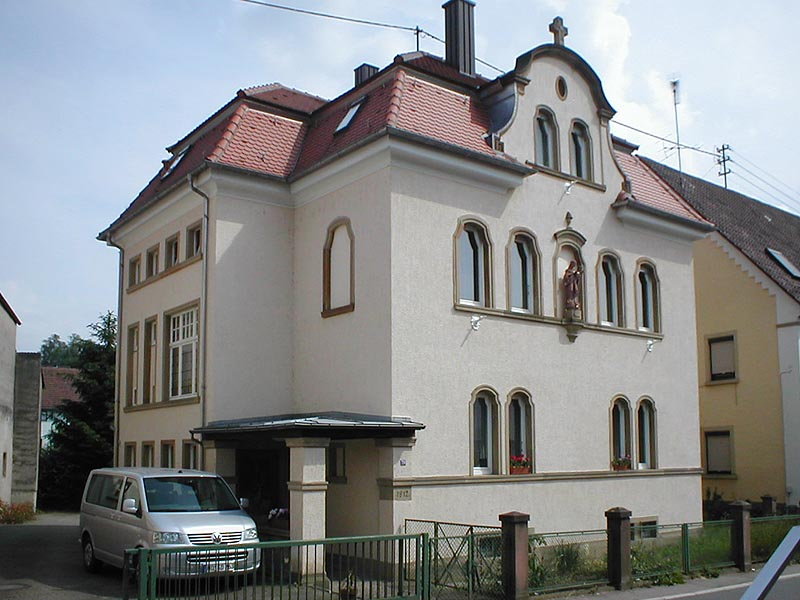
Kath. Parish hall

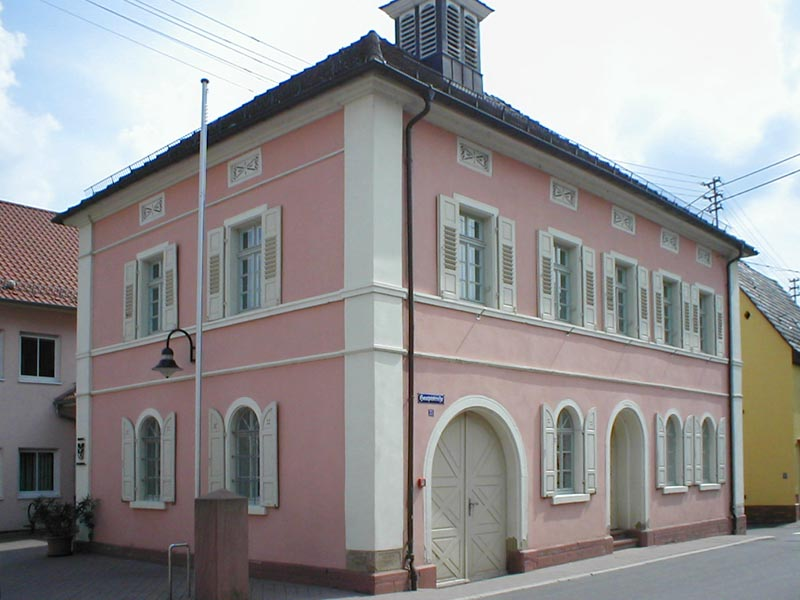
City Hall

== Economy and Infrastructure ==
=== Economy ===
Until the 1960s, the main source of income for the Spechbach family was agriculture. In 1960 there were 55 full-time farms of which only one still exists today. In 2007 there were still eight part-time businesses.

=== Infrastructure ===
Spechbach has been a federal pilot community since February 16, 2012. With its inclusion in the federal pilot project "Energy-efficient urban renovation - energy-efficient district supply" by the Federal Ministry for Transport, Building and Urban Development and the KfW Reconstruction Loan Corporation, the community and its project "BürgerEnergiedorf Spechbach" are among five pilot projects in Baden-Württemberg.

=== Education ===
Confessional schools have been documented in Spechbach since the 17th century, and a community schoolhouse from 1880. Since December 1966 there is only one primary school, all secondary schools are in the surrounding communities and cities.
