= Malsch (Rhein-Neckar) =

- Municipality
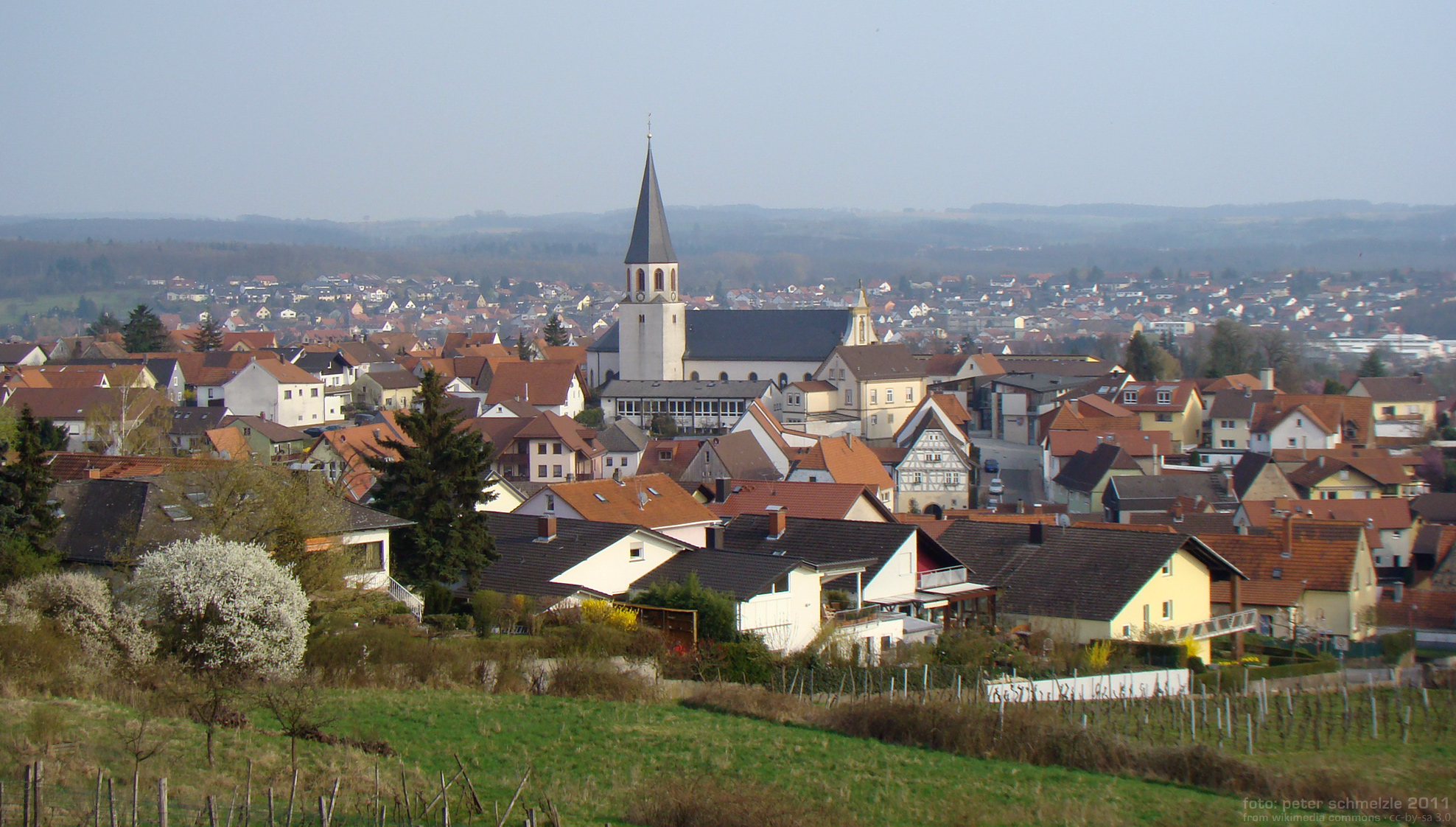
- Malsch as seen from Letzenberg hill

- Coat of arms

- Location of Malsch within Rhein-Neckar-Kreis district
- Interactive map of Malsch
- Location within Germany Location within Baden-Württemberg
- Coordinates: 49°14′47″N 08°40′59″E
- Country: Germany
- State: Baden-Württemberg
- Admin. region: Karlsruhe
- District: Rhein-Neckar-Kreis

Government
  - Mayor (2022–30): Tobias Greulich

Area
  - Total: 6.77 km^{2} (2.61 sq mi)
- Elevation: 171 m (561 ft)

Population (2025-12-31)
  - Total: 3,451
  - Density: 510/km^{2} (1,320/sq mi)
- Time zone: UTC+01:00 (CET)
  - Summer (DST): UTC+02:00 (CEST)
- Postal codes: 69254
- Dialling codes: 07253
- Vehicle registration: HD
- Website: www.malsch-weinort.de

Malsch (German pronunciation: [malʃ]) is a municipality in the district of Rhein-Neckar in Baden-Württemberg in Germany.

== Geography ==
=== Geographical Location ===
Malsch is located in the northwestern corner of the Kraichgau south of the cities of Wiesloch and Walldorf at the border of the Upper Rhine Plain. The town is located at the foot of the Letzenberg, a hill of 244 m height.

=== Neighboring towns ===
Adjacent towns are, starting from the north clockwise: Malschenberg, Rauenberg, Mühlhausen, Rettigheim, Östringen, Bad Schönborn, Kronau und St. Leon-Rot.
