= Ilvesheim =

- Municipality
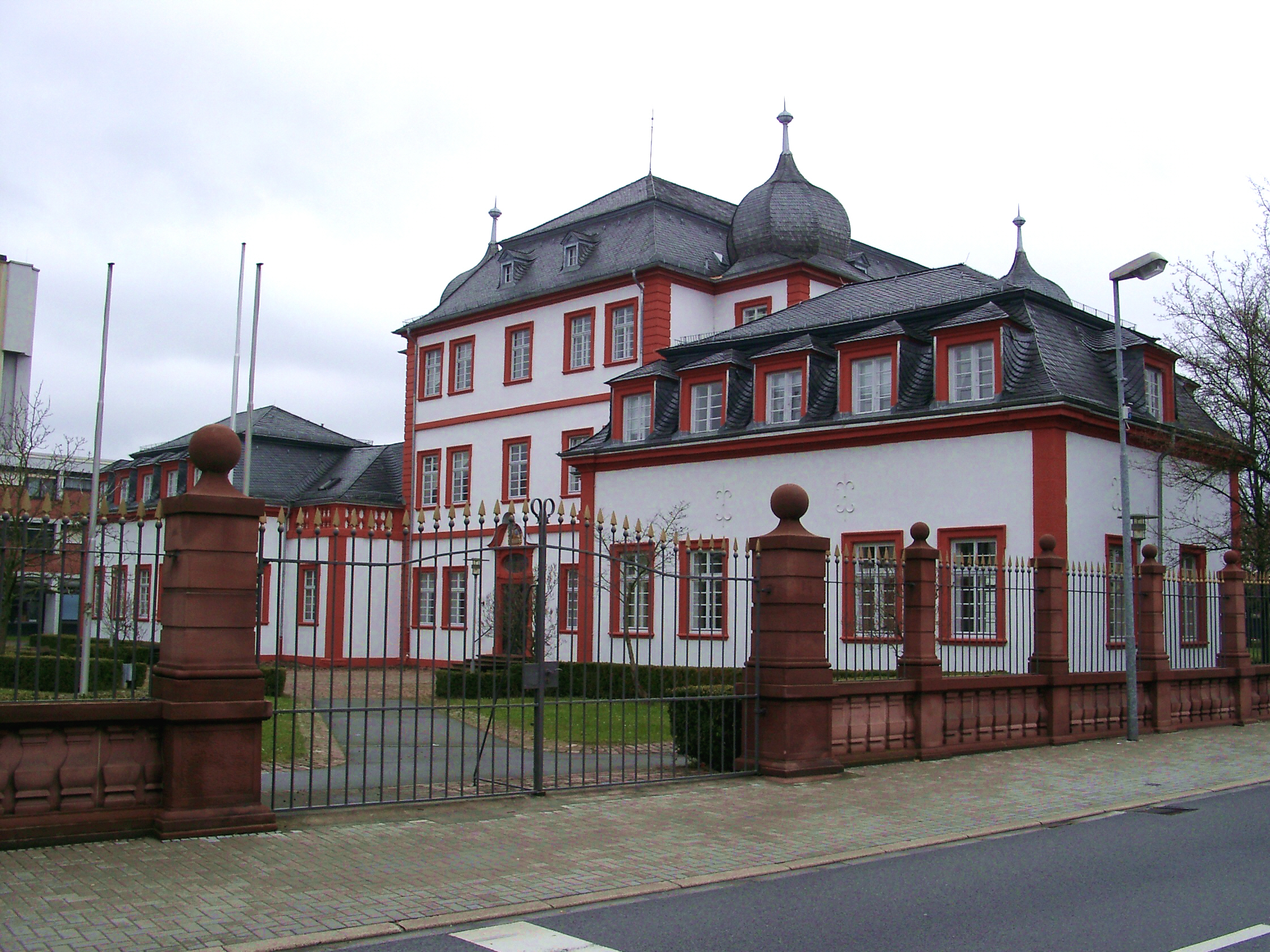
- Castle

- Coat of arms

- Location of Ilvesheim within Rhein-Neckar-Kreis district
- Interactive map of Ilvesheim
- Location within Germany Location within Baden-Württemberg
- Coordinates: 49°28′21″N 08°34′03″E
- Country: Germany
- State: Baden-Württemberg
- Admin. region: Karlsruhe
- District: Rhein-Neckar-Kreis

Government
  - Mayor (2023–31): Thorsten Walther (SPD)

Area
  - Total: 5.89 km^{2} (2.27 sq mi)
- Elevation: 97 m (318 ft)

Population (2025-12-31)
  - Total: 9,231
  - Density: 1,570/km^{2} (4,060/sq mi)
- Time zone: UTC+01:00 (CET)
  - Summer (DST): UTC+02:00 (CEST)
- Postal codes: 68543–68549
- Dialling codes: 0621
- Vehicle registration: HD
- Website: www.ilvesheim.de

Ilvesheim (German pronunciation: [ˈɪlvəsˌhaɪ̯m]), Palatine German: Ilwese) is a municipality of about 9,300 residents (2022) in the district of Rhein-Neckar in Baden-Württemberg in Germany. It is one of the first towns located along the famous Bertha Benz Memorial Route.

== History ==
Ilvesheim was first mentioned in a deed of the Lorsch Abbey from March 14, 766 AD, as a village called "Ulvinisheim". The ending "heim" means it was founded during the Frankish conquests. It is not clear whether the current name is from a then-resident called "Ulvinius" or after a small tributary creek that empties into the Neckar River, called "Ilbe."

Emperor Barbarossa transferred the Lorsch possession to his half brother, the Palatinate Count Conrad in 1155. Since the end of the 13th century, Ilvesheim indisputably belonged to the Kurpfalz and was a part of the Seckenheimer concentrum. The area started as a fiefdom under the Lords of Strahlenberg. In the middle of the 14th century, it fell to the squires from Erligheim; from 1550-1654 the county of Steinach, and then to the barons of Hundheim in 1700.

The town was heavily destroyed during the Nine Years War in 1689. After the breakup of the Palatinate in 1803, Ilvesheim eventually transferred to the Grand Duchy of Baden, and administered by the Office of Ladenburg. In 1863, it fell under the district office of Mannheim, which later became Mannheim County (Landkreis). Today Ilvesheim is its own independent municipality, but part of the Heidelberg licensing district.

In the 18th century Ilvesheim exhibited a typical size for country towns in the region. Circa 1850, there was a surge in growth. After World War II the town took in more than 500 displaced persons. Between 1871 and 1961 Ilvesheim had the fastest growth rate in the district of Mannheim, reaching a then all-time high of 8196 residents in 1973. After falling to only 6862 residents in 1997, the community has rebounded with an upswing in construction of new housing.

== Location ==
Ilvesheim lies predominantly on the northside of a large natural loop on the Neckar river. After the Neckar canal was built in the 1920s to facilitate transport shipping the main part of the city was effectively severed from the northern land, and became an "island," sandwiched between the Neckar river to the south, and the new waterway to the north. These days, the island effect is becoming less prominent as housing construction expands to the north of the canal (an area known as Nord-Ilvesheim). There is also a small section of land and group of houses on the east side of the Neckar river called "Neckarplatten" which falls under Ilvesheim's administration. Overall the district covers 589 acres, 35.3 percent of which consists of housing and roads, 6.8 percent water, and 55 percent used for agriculture. [2] Ilvesheim actively uses its agricultural lands.

== Nature ==
Ilvesheim is in a part of the Neckar river water protection area. There is a makeshift beach located on the north side of the river, just across from the Seckenheim Schloss, which is frequented during the summer months. Fishing outside of the area is quite popular. In Nord Ilvesheim, there is a nature recovery zone with a lake cordoned off by a fence and trees. This project was started after years of pollution and littering destroyed the natural environment. Visitation to the area is not open to the general public but may be coordinated through the Rathaus (City Hall).

== Sports and Leisure ==
Along the Neckar river there is a hard-surfaced walking/biking path, elevated above the bank, which makes up a portion of the Neckar recreational path. The path skirts housing as well as the outside sports center with soccer fields and an outdoor swimming pool (Freibad), popular during the summer months. There is also a putt-putt course open from March until October, next to a playground. On the southside of the canal is the Neckarhalle and Hallenbad, home to many indoor sport events, to include handball, swimming, indoor soccer, and karate.

== Neighbouring places ==
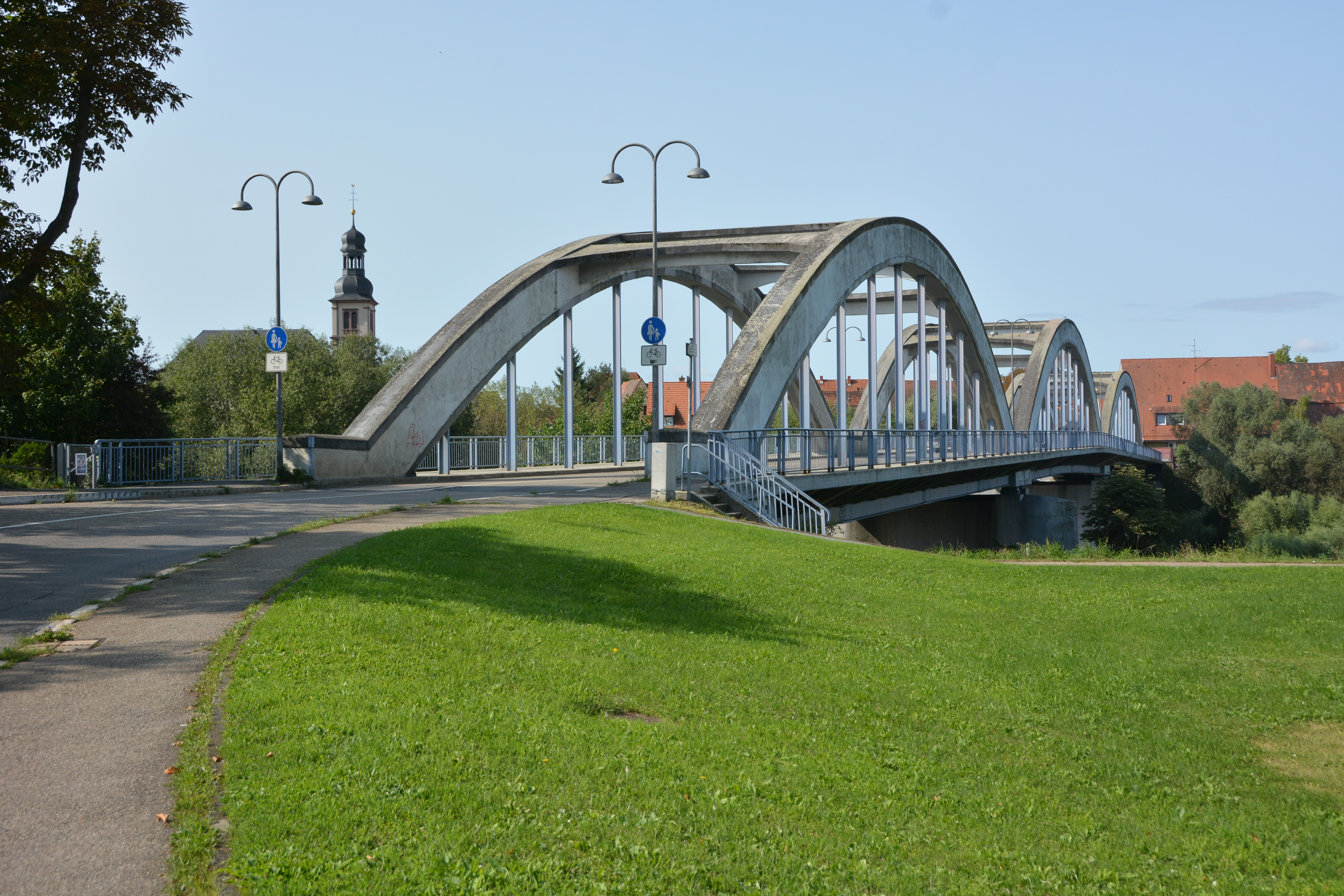
Neckar Bridge to Mannheim-Seckenheim

Ilvesheim is bordered mainly by Mannheim administrative communities to the south (Seckenheim), west (Feudenheim) and partly to the north (Strassenheim and farmland). It is bordered by Heddesheim to the northeast, and Ladenburg and Edingen-Neckarhausen east along the Neckar river. Although it is situated closer to Mannheim, Ilvesheim is part of the greater Heidelberg licensing district, being its westernmost municipality. Its residents register their vehicles with the "HD" symbol, rather than the "MA" seen in Mannheim. Ilvesheim is well connected to both cities via the tramline RNV 5 (stop in Seckenheim, just south of the river). Mannheim is about 10 km westward, while Heidelberg is about 15 km southeast from Ilvesheim.

== Weather ==
The climate is governed mostly by maritime air masses, and winds prevail mostly from the west. [4] Ilvesheim and the surrounding area benefit from the sheltered position in the Rhine valley between the Haardt (hills) in the west and the Odenwald in the east. Between 1971 and 2000, a weather station in Mannheim recorded an average temperature of 10.5 °C and 668 mm of rainfall per year. The warmest month is July with an average of 19.9 °C, the coldest January with 1.8 °C. Temperatures above 30 °C are not uncommon in the summer. Most rainfall occurs in July and the driest month is February. [5]

Average Monthly Temperature and Precipitation for Mannheim 1971–2000

	Jan	Feb	Mär	Apr	Mai	Jun	Jul	Aug	Sep	Okt	Nov	Dez
Temperature (°C)	1,8	2,7	6,6	10,0	14,8	17,6	19,9	19,5	15,4	10,2	5,2	2,9	Ø	10,5
Precipitation (mm)	40	38	46	48	73	74	83	49	56	54	55	53	Σ	668
