= Vorderheubach =

Coordinates: 49.4897°N 8.7764°E

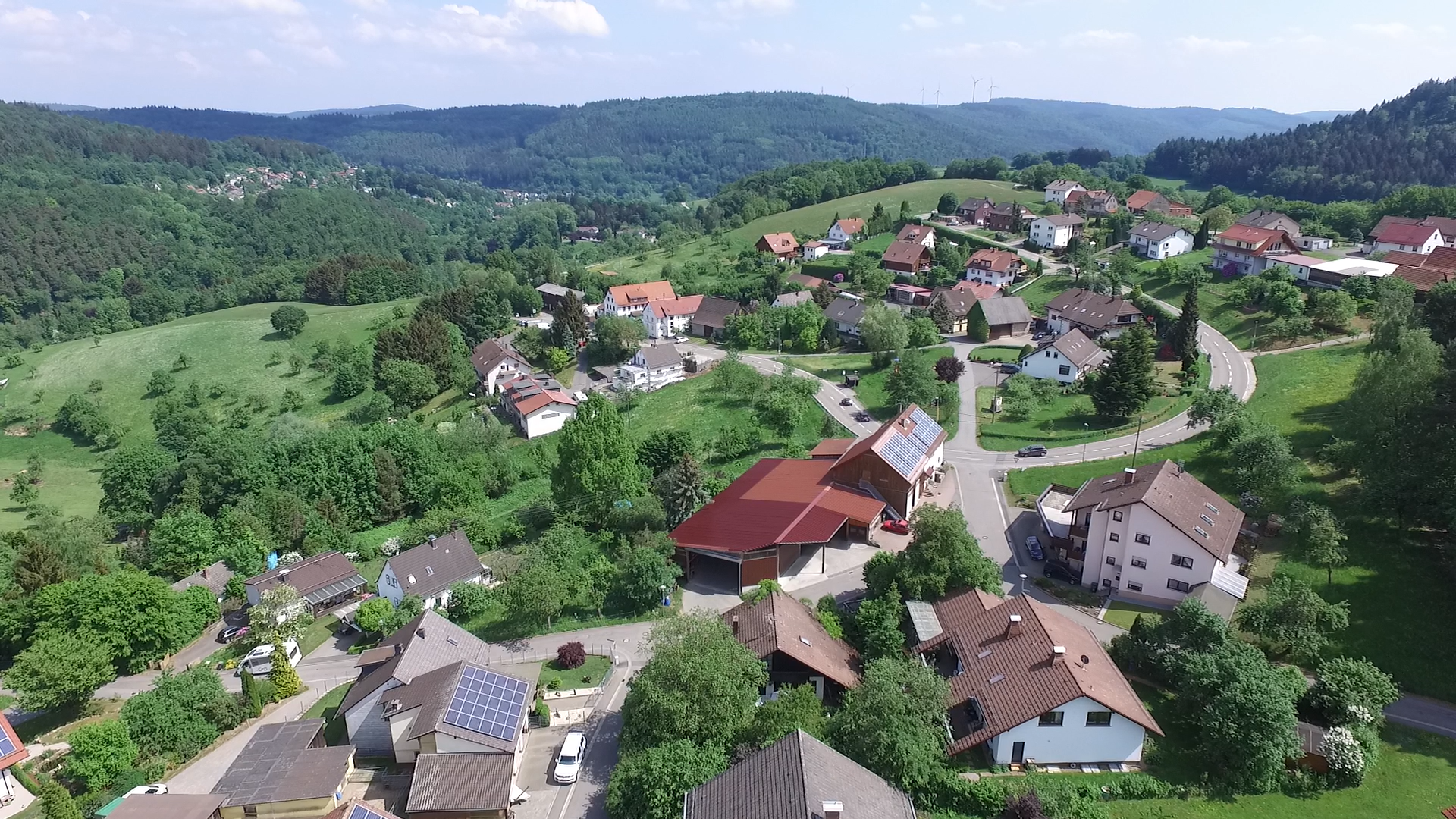

Vorderheubach is a district of the Heiligkreuzsteinach municipality in Odenwald. The place is with Lampenhain, Bärsbach, Hilsenhain and the small farm Hinerheubach district Lampenhain. The place belonged to Lampenhain community until 31 December 1974, and was then combined with Heiligkreuzsteinach. In the village live around 200 inhabitants.

== Attractions ==
In Vorderheubach lie the ruins of the medieval castle Waldeck, which was built in the second half of the 13th Century by Strahlenberger in order to consolidate their rule over some villages in the Odenwald. In 1357 they sold the rule Waldeck rule with the castle and the associated villages along the Palatines. The area has since been known under the name "winery Waldeck".
