= Jan-Peter Röderer =

German politician (born 1986)

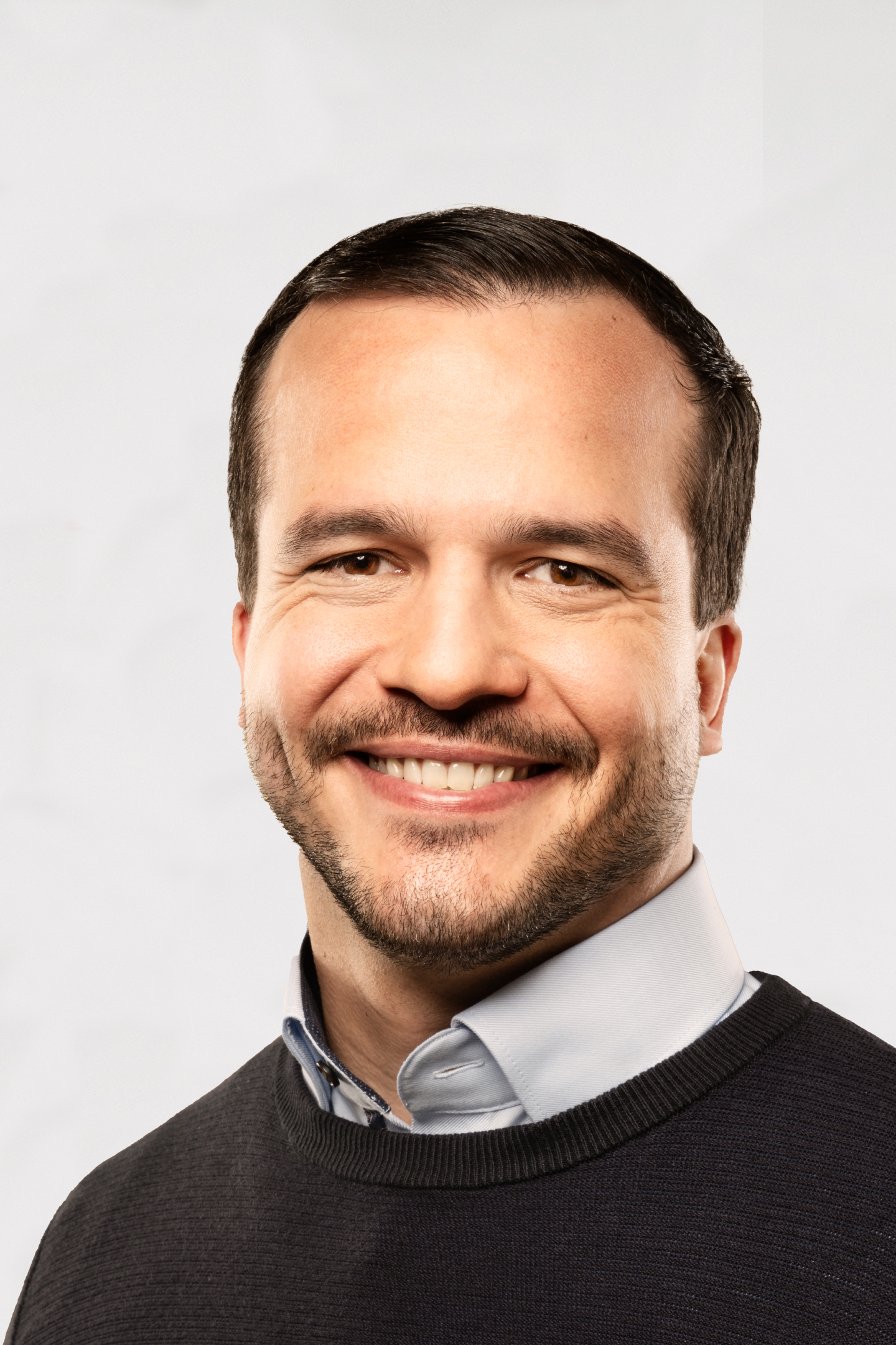
- Röderer in 2021

Member of the Landtag of Baden-Württemberg
- In office 11 May 2021 – 12 May 2026
- Constituency: Sinsheim

Personal details
- Born: 18 May 1986 (age 40)
- Party: Social Democratic Party

Jan-Peter Röderer (born 18 May 1986) is a German politician serving as secretary general of the Social Democratic Party in Baden-Württemberg since 2026. From 2021 to 2026, he was a member of the Landtag of Baden-Württemberg.
