= Rhein-Neckar-Kreis =

- District
- Flag Coat of arms
- Coordinates: 49°22′N 8°44′E
- Country: Germany
- State: Baden-Württemberg
- Adm. region: Karlsruhe
- Founded: 1973
- Capital: Heidelberg

Government
  - District admin.: Stefan Dallinger (CDU)

Area
  - Total: 1,061.7 km^{2} (409.9 sq mi)

Population (31 December 2025)
  - Total: 559,097
  - Density: 526.61/km^{2} (1,363.9/sq mi)
- Time zone: UTC+01:00 (CET)
  - Summer (DST): UTC+02:00 (CEST)
- Vehicle registration: HD
- Website: www.rhein-neckar-kreis.de

The Rhein-Neckar-Kreis (German pronunciation: [ˈʁaɪ̯n ˈnɛkaʁ ˈkʁaɪ̯s]) is a district in the northwest of Baden-Württemberg, Germany. The administrative headquarters are based in the city Heidelberg, which is a district-free city. As of 2019, the district is the most populous in Baden-Württemberg.

== History ==
The district was created in 1973 by merging the previous districts of Heidelberg, Mannheim and Sinsheim.

== Geography ==
The district is named after the two main rivers which flow through the district, the Rhine and Neckar. The highest elevation is 580 m near the 584 m tall peak of the Odenwald mountain Stiefelhöhe, located near Heiligkreuzsteinach. The lowest elevation with 92 m is in Ilvesheim, located in the Neckar valley.

== Sights ==
Dilsberg	Bergfeste Dilsberg is a castle on a mountain over the Neckar River in Neckargemünd.
Eberbach	The historic old town with its four towers, many timber-frame houses and some town wall remnants, is a magnet for tourists.
Hockenheim	The Hockenheimring is the home of the Formula One German Grand Prix.
Ladenburg	Ladenburg has an old town from the Late Middle Ages. Its history dates back to Celtic and Roman ages.
Neckargemünd	Neckargemünd still keeps its medieval charm.
Schwetzingen	Schwetzingen Castle was the summer residence of the Electors Palatine Karl III Philip and Charles Theodore.
Sinsheim	Sinsheim's main tourist attraction is the Sinsheim Auto & Technik Museum, displaying a collection of historic vehicles to over 1 million visitors per year.
Weinheim	Weinheim is situated on the Bergstraße ("Mountain Road") on the western rim of the Odenwald.

== Government ==
The district is governed by a district assembly (Kreistag) and a district executive (Landrat). The eligible voters of the district elect the Kreistag every 5 years. This body in turn elects the Landrat every 8 years. The Landrat is the legal representative of the district as well as the speaker of the Kreistag and its committees. The Landrat manages the office of the Landrat (Landratsamt) and is the chief official of the district. The duties of the Landrat include the preparation of the district assembly meetings and its committees. The Landrat calls the meetings, acts as speaker, and carries out the decisions made. In the Kreistag, the Landrat has no vote. The Landrat has a second, called the first district official (Erste Landesbeamte).

Landrat of the district Heidelberg 1945–1972:

- 1945–1946: Hermann Specht (provisional)
- 1946–1947: Erich Reimann
- 1947–1954: Herbert Klotz
- 1954–1972: Georg Steinbrenner

Landrat of the district Mannheim 1945–1972:

- 1945: Richard Freudenberg (appointed)
- 1945–1946: Karl Geppert (appointed)
- 1946: Dr. Valentin Gaa (appointed)
- 1946–1948: Ernst Becherer
- 1948–1970: Dr. Valentin Gaa
- 1970–1972: Albert Neckenauer

Landrat of the district Sinsheim 1945–1972:

- 1945–1946: Roman Großmann (appointed)
- 1946: Gottlob Barth und Dr. Kurt von Kirchenheim (both appointed)
- 1946: Wolfgang Rutschke (appointed to oversee businesses)
- 1946–1947: Hermann Lindner (appointed)
- 1947–1948: Dr. Johann Gutermann
- 1948: Dr. Ludwig Bernheim
- 1948–1949: Georg Steinbrenner (appointed to oversee businesses)
- 1949–1950: Dr. Walther Reidel (appointed)
- 1950–1972: Dr. Paul Herrmann

Landrat of Rhein-Neckar-Kreis since 1973:

- 1973 Georg Steinbrenner, Amtsverweser
- 1973–1986: Albert Neckenauer
- 1986-2010: Dr. Jürgen Schütz
- 2010 - to present: Stefan Dallinger

=== Coat of arms ===
The wavy line in the left of the coat of arms represent the two rivers Rhine and Neckar. The lion in the right side is the symbol of Palatinate, as the area belonged to that area historically.

== Towns and municipalities ==
Clickable map of towns and municipalities in the district

Städte (towns)
Eberbach	15 258	81.2 km^{2}
Eppelheim	14 629	5.6 km^{2}
Hemsbach	12 230	12.9 km^{2}
Hockenheim	21 031	34.8 km^{2}
Ladenburg	11 473	19 km^{2}
Leimen	26 932	20.6 km^{2}
Neckarbischofsheim	3 946	26.4 km^{2}
Neckargemünd	14 032	26.2 km^{2}
Rauenberg	7 631	11.1 km^{2}
Schönau	4 696	22.5 km^{2}
Schriesheim	14 855	31.6 km^{2}
Schwetzingen	22 159	21.6 km^{2}
Sinsheim	35 517	127 km^{2}
Waibstadt	5 659	25.6 km^{2}
Walldorf	14 774	19.9 km^{2}
Weinheim	43 692	58.1 km^{2}
Wiesloch	25 897	30.3 km^{2}
Gemeinden (Municipalities)
Altlußheim	5 296	16 km^{2}
Angelbachtal	5 002	17.9 km^{2}
Bammental	6 498	12.2 km^{2}
Brühl	14 256	10.2 km^{2}
Dielheim	8 933	22.7 km^{2}
Dossenheim	12 008	14.1 km^{2}
Edingen-Neckarhausen	14 127	12 km^{2}
Epfenbach	2 517	13 km^{2}
Eschelbronn	2 572	8.2 km^{2}
Gaiberg	2 427	4.2 km^{2}
Heddesbach	494	8.2 km^{2}
Heddesheim	11 566	14.7 km^{2}
Heiligkreuzsteinach	3 054	19.6 km^{2}
Helmstadt-Bargen	3 793	28 km^{2}
Hirschberg an der Bergstraße	9 405	12.4 km^{2}
Ilvesheim	7 768	5.9 km^{2}
Ketsch	12 808	16.5 km^{2}
Laudenbach	6 110	10.3 km^{2}
Lobbach	2 401	14.9 km^{2}
Malsch	3 401	6.8 km^{2}
Mauer	3 919	6.3 km^{2}
Meckesheim	5 343	16.3 km^{2}
Mühlhausen (Kraichgau)	8 218	15.3 km^{2}
Neidenstein	1 820	8.5 km^{2}
Neulußheim	6 675	3.4 km^{2}
Nußloch	10 734	13.6 km^{2}
Oftersheim	10 686	12.8 km^{2}
Plankstadt	9 559	8.4 km^{2}
Reichartshausen	2 015	10 km^{2}
Reilingen	7 068	16.4 km^{2}
Sandhausen	14 336	14.6 km^{2}
Schönbrunn	2 987	34.5 km^{2}
Spechbach	1 720	8.5 km^{2}
St. Leon-Rot	12 539	25.6 km^{2}
Wiesenbach	3 092	11.1 km^{2}
Wilhelmsfeld	3 293	4.8 km^{2}
Zuzenhausen	2 138	11.6 km^{2}

== International relations ==
Rhein-Neckar-Kreis is twinned with:

- Vichy, France (since 1965)
