= Zuzenhausen =

- Municipality
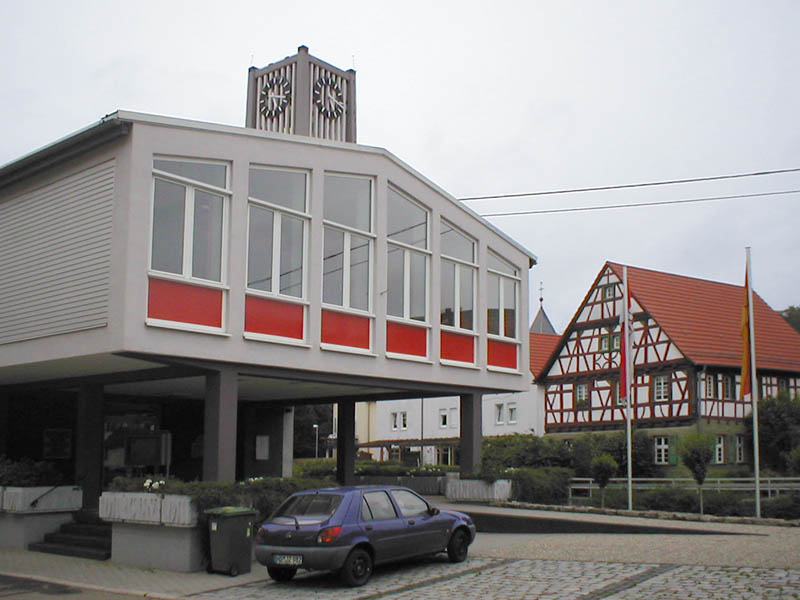
- Town hall

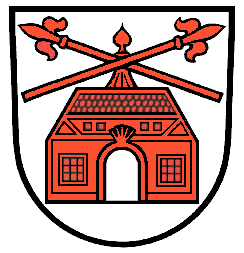
- Coat of arms

- Location of Zuzenhausen within Rhein-Neckar-Kreis district
- Interactive map of Zuzenhausen
- Location within Germany Location within Baden-Württemberg
- Coordinates: 49°18′N 8°49′E
- Country: Germany
- State: Baden-Württemberg
- Admin. region: Karlsruhe
- District: Rhein-Neckar-Kreis

Government
  - Mayor (2018–26): Hagen Zuber (Ind.)

Area
  - Total: 11.64 km^{2} (4.49 sq mi)
- Elevation: 148 m (486 ft)

Population (2025-12-31)
  - Total: 2,407
  - Density: 206.8/km^{2} (535.6/sq mi)
- Time zone: UTC+01:00 (CET)
  - Summer (DST): UTC+02:00 (CEST)
- Postal codes: 74939
- Dialling codes: 06226
- Vehicle registration: HD
- Website: www.zuzenhausen.de

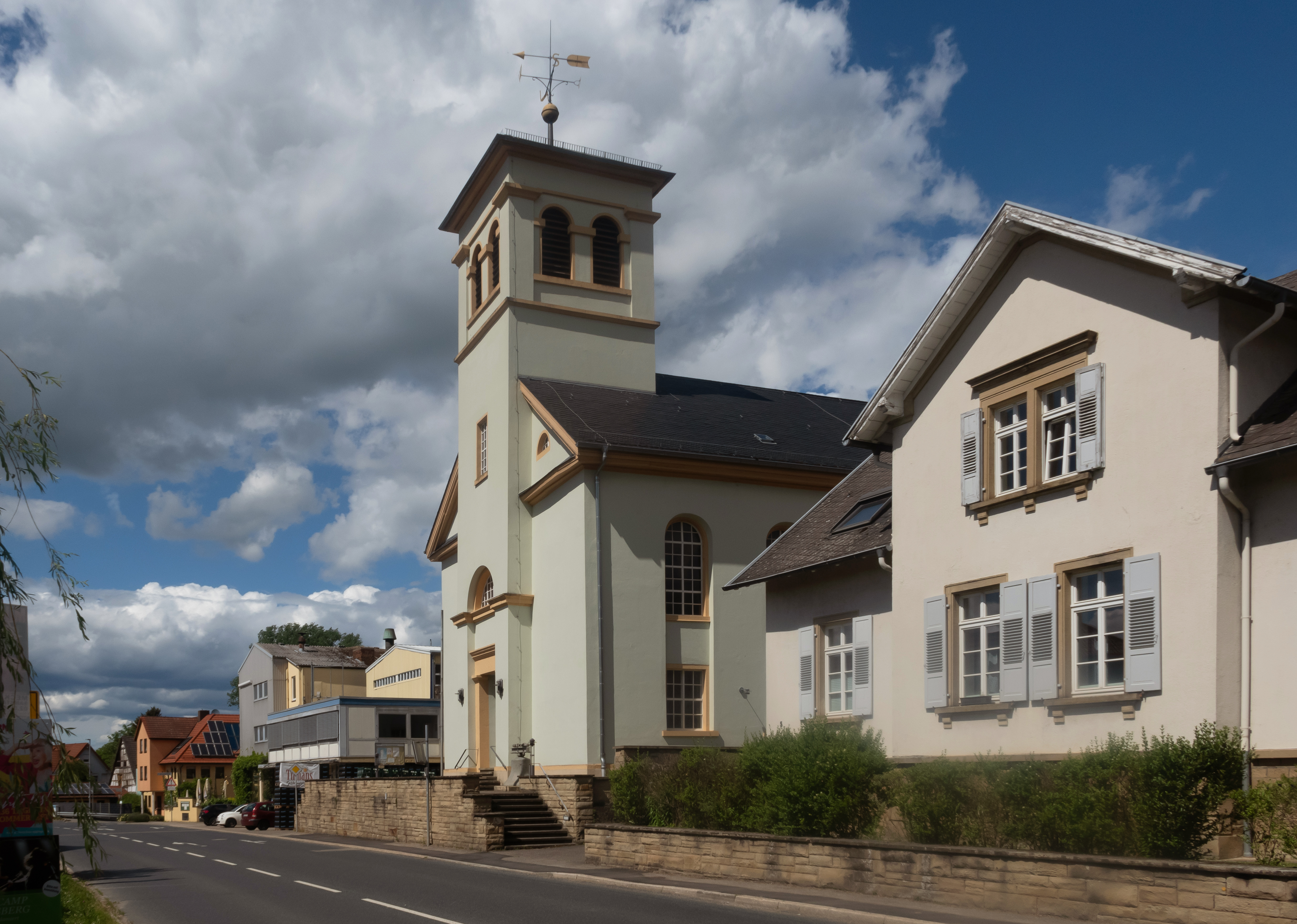
Zuzenhausen, reformed church

Zuzenhausen is a municipality in Baden-Württemberg, Germany, and is part of the Rhein-Neckar-Kreis.

== Geography ==
=== Location ===
Zuzenhausen is in the northern part of Kraichgau, about 8 km from Sinsheim in the Elsenz river valley.

=== Neighboring communities ===
The municipality is bordered to the north by Meckesheim, to the east by Eschelbronn, to the south by the city of Sinsheim, and to the west by Dielheim.

== History ==
Together with the Zent of Meckesheim, Zuzenhausen became part of the Electorate of the Palatinate in 1330. The overlordship of the castle and the town, however, belonged to the Bishopric of Speyer. Speyer enfeoffed the Barons von Venningen at least partially since the 14th century and completely from 1637. In 1803 Zuzenhausen became part of Baden. With the municipal reform of Baden-Württembergischen, Zuzenhausen retained its independence and entered a municipal association with Sinsheim and Angelbachtal in 1974.

== Government ==
=== Municipal council ===
The municipal council consists of 10 members in addition to the chairperson and the mayor.

Municipal council June 13, 2004
Party	Votes	Seats
FWG (Freie Wähler Gemeinschaft)	38.32%	4
CDU	31.47%	3
SPD	30.21%	3
Voter participation: 67.96%

=== Mayor ===
The mayor is Hagen Zuber, elected in July 2018.

=== Coat of arms ===
The coat of arms comes from a court seal from 1748. It was fashioned by the General State Archive in 1905. The house is a pictorial representation of the community name. The lily staves are from the coat of arms of the barons of Venningen, who lorded over Zuzenhausen for hundreds of years.

The flag is red and white and was awarded by the Ministry of the State in 1963.

=== Sister cities ===
- La Colle-sur-Loup, France
- Crostau, Saxony

== Attractions ==
=== Regular events ===
Every two years Zuzenhausen celebrates the Dachsenfranzfest, a historical Volksfest in memory of Franzesko Regali, Dachsenfranz. Dachsenfranz was a city icon of Italian heritage. He lived in the region in the second half of the 19th century and the beginning of the 20th century. The Dachsenfranzfest was last celebrated in 2006.

== Economy and infrastructure ==
=== Education ===
In Zuzenhausen there is a primary school. Secondary schools are to be found in the surrounding communities.
