= Heddesbach =

- Municipality
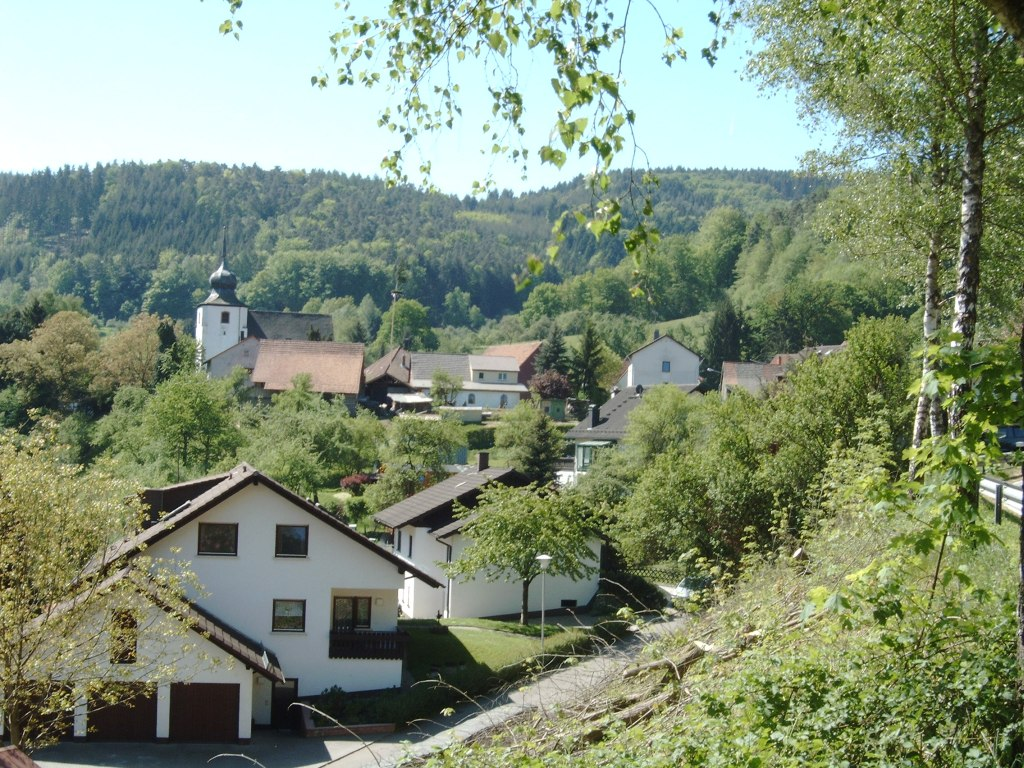

- Coat of arms

- Location of Heddesbach within Rhein-Neckar-Kreis district
- Interactive map of Heddesbach
- Location within Germany Location within Baden-Württemberg
- Coordinates: 49°28′53″N 08°49′38″E
- Country: Germany
- State: Baden-Württemberg
- Admin. region: Karlsruhe
- District: Rhein-Neckar-Kreis

Government
  - Mayor (2019–27): Volker Reibold

Area
  - Total: 8.21 km^{2} (3.17 sq mi)
- Elevation: 204 m (669 ft)

Population (2025-12-31)
  - Total: 469
  - Density: 57.1/km^{2} (148/sq mi)
- Time zone: UTC+01:00 (CET)
  - Summer (DST): UTC+02:00 (CEST)
- Postal codes: 69434
- Dialling codes: 06272
- Vehicle registration: HD
- Website: www.heddesbach.de

Heddesbach is a town in the district of Rhein-Neckar in Baden-Württemberg in Germany.
