= Heddesheim =

- Municipality
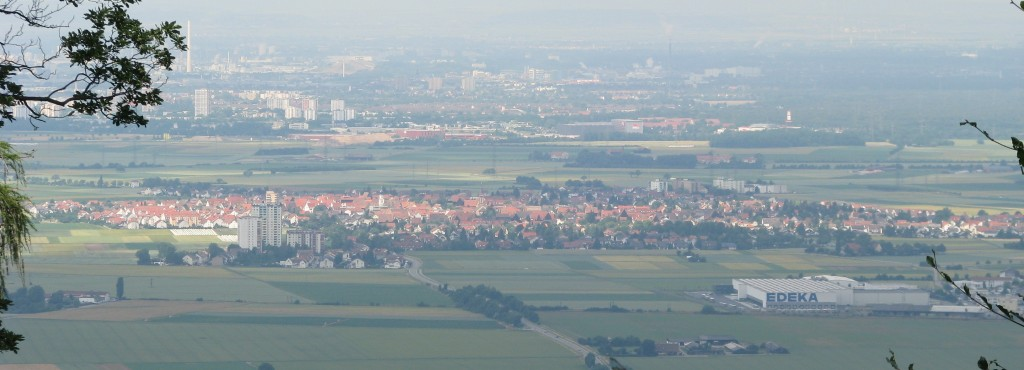

- Coat of arms

- Location of Heddesheim within Rhein-Neckar-Kreis district
- Interactive map of Heddesheim
- Location within Germany Location within Baden-Württemberg
- Coordinates: 49°30′19″N 08°36′12″E
- Country: Germany
- State: Baden-Württemberg
- Admin. region: Karlsruhe
- District: Rhein-Neckar-Kreis

Government
  - Mayor (2022–30): Achim Weitz

Area
  - Total: 14.70 km^{2} (5.68 sq mi)
- Elevation: 101 m (331 ft)

Population (2025-12-31)
  - Total: 12,382
  - Density: 842.3/km^{2} (2,182/sq mi)
- Time zone: UTC+01:00 (CET)
  - Summer (DST): UTC+02:00 (CEST)
- Postal codes: 68536–68542
- Dialling codes: 06203
- Vehicle registration: HD
- Website: www.heddesheim.de

Heddesheim is a municipality in the district of Rhein-Neckar-Kreis, in Baden-Württemberg, Germany. It is situated 9 km east of Mannheim, and 7 km southwest of Weinheim.
