= Sankt Leon-Rot =

- Municipality
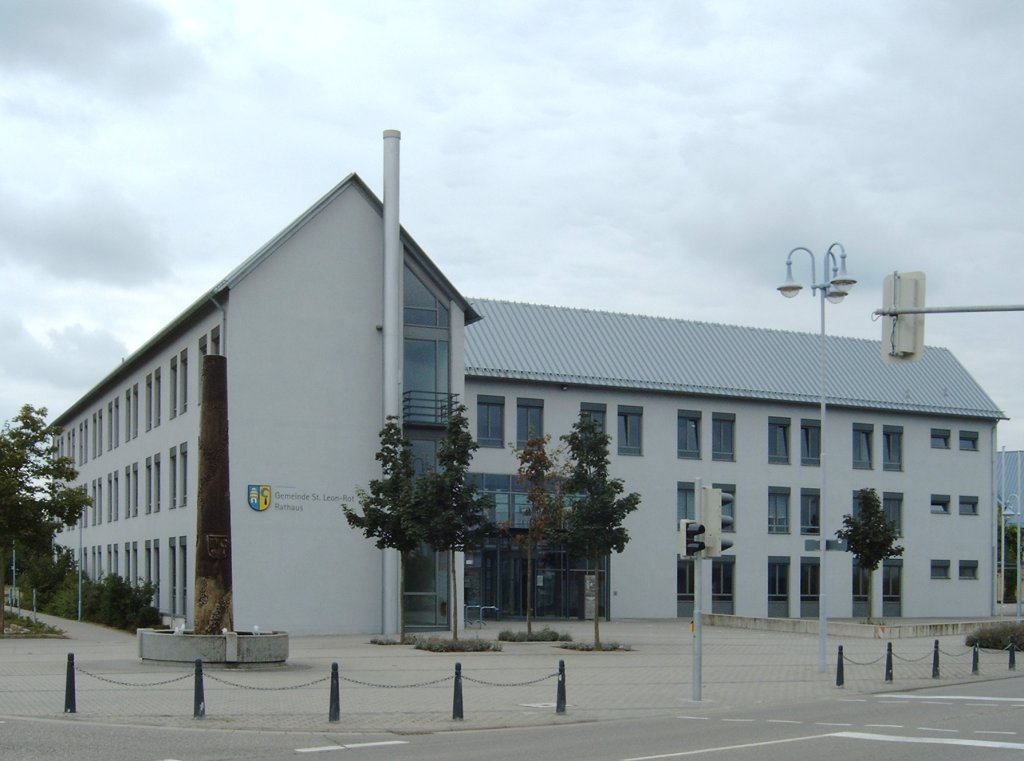
- Town hall

- Coat of arms

- Location of Sankt Leon-Rot within Rhein-Neckar-Kreis district
- Interactive map of Sankt Leon-Rot
- Location within Germany Location within Baden-Württemberg
- Coordinates: 49°15′55″N 08°35′55″E
- Country: Germany
- State: Baden-Württemberg
- Admin. region: Karlsruhe
- District: Rhein-Neckar-Kreis

Government
  - Mayor (2022–30): Alexander Eger

Area
  - Total: 25.56 km^{2} (9.87 sq mi)
- Elevation: 107 m (351 ft)

Population (2025-12-31)
  - Total: 13,978
  - Density: 546.9/km^{2} (1,416/sq mi)
- Time zone: UTC+01:00 (CET)
  - Summer (DST): UTC+02:00 (CEST)
- Postal codes: 68789
- Dialling codes: 06227
- Vehicle registration: HD
- Website: www.st-leon-rot.de

Sankt Leon-Rot is a municipality in the district of Rhein-Neckar-Kreis, in Baden-Württemberg, Germany. It is situated 16 km south of Heidelberg.

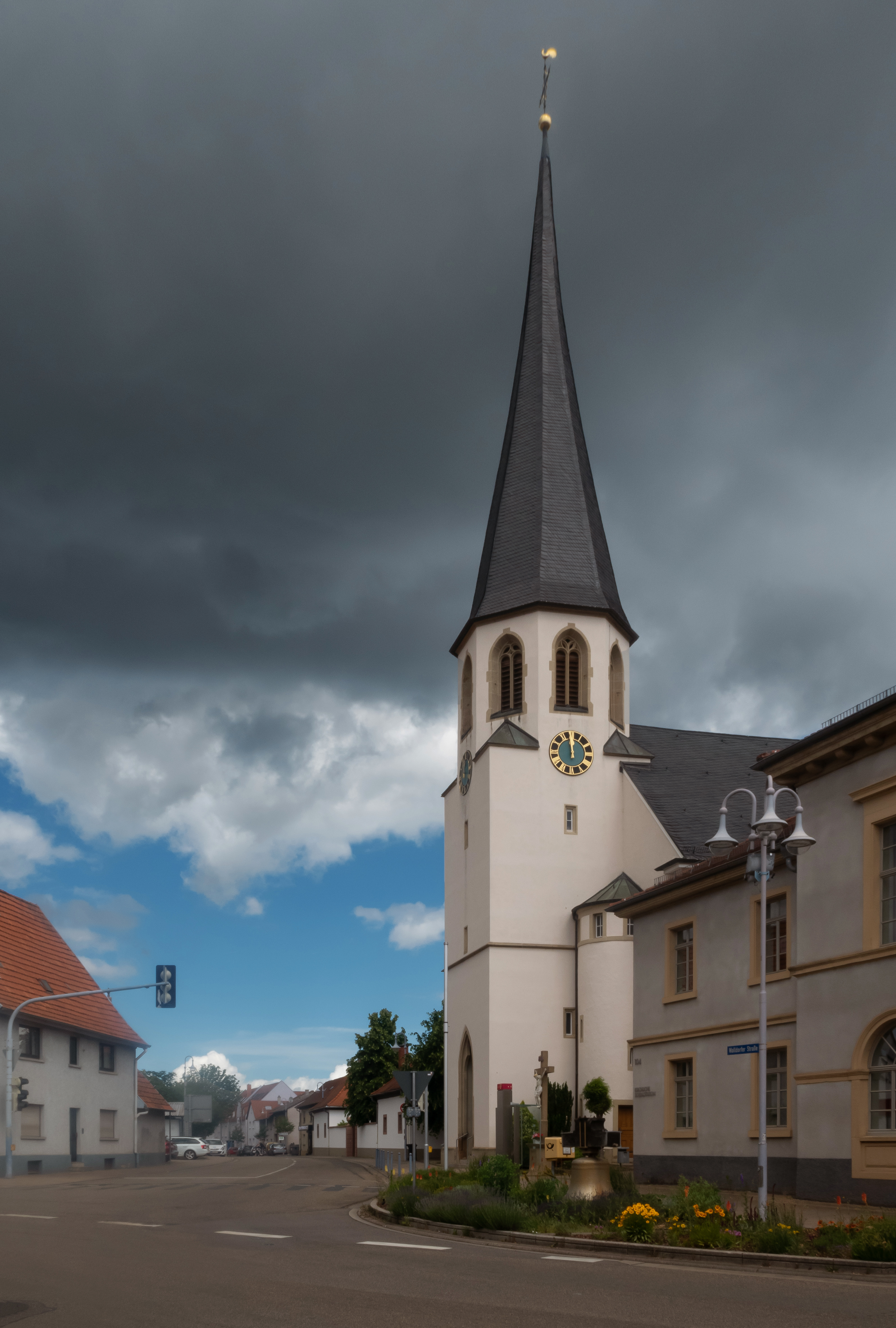
Sankt Leon-Rot, church: Sankt-Mauritiuskirche

== Geographical location ==
Sankt Leon-Rot is located in the Kraichbach lowlands, belonging to the Upper Rhine Graben. It is part of the Rhine-Neckar metropolitan region.
