= Helmstadt-Bargen =

- Municipality
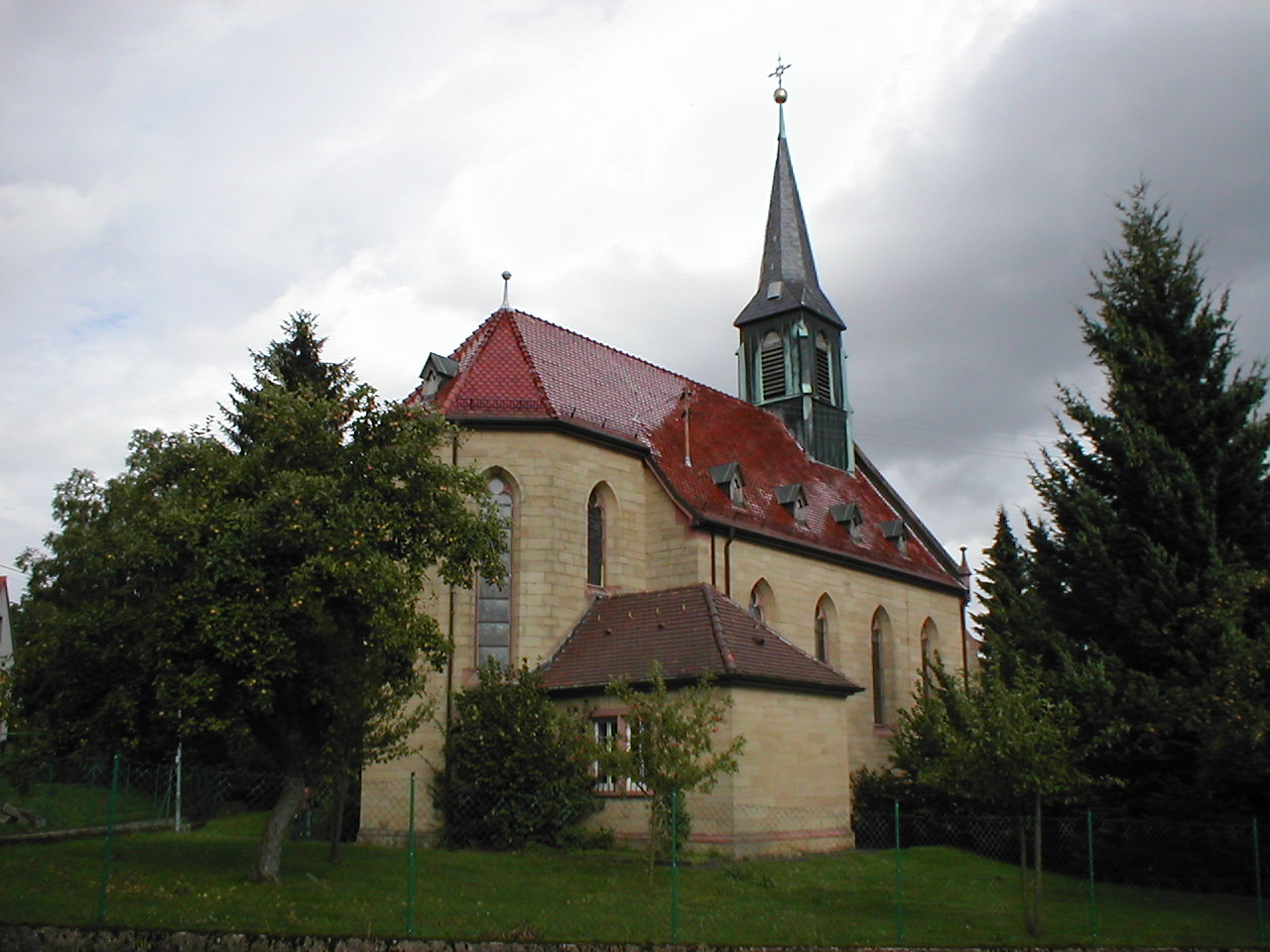

- Coat of arms

- Location of Helmstadt-Bargen within Rhein-Neckar-Kreis district
- Interactive map of Helmstadt-Bargen
- Location within Germany Location within Baden-Württemberg
- Coordinates: 49°19′33″N 08°58′34″E
- Country: Germany
- State: Baden-Württemberg
- Admin. region: Karlsruhe
- District: Rhein-Neckar-Kreis

Government
  - Mayor (2017–25): Wolfgang Jürriens

Area
  - Total: 27.95 km^{2} (10.79 sq mi)
- Elevation: 219 m (719 ft)

Population (2025-12-31)
  - Total: 3,914
  - Density: 140.0/km^{2} (362.7/sq mi)
- Time zone: UTC+01:00 (CET)
  - Summer (DST): UTC+02:00 (CEST)
- Postal codes: 74921
- Dialling codes: 07263
- Vehicle registration: HD
- Website: www.helmstadt-bargen.de

Helmstadt-Bargen (German pronunciation: [ˈhɛlmˌʃtat ˈbaʁɡn̩]) is a town in the district of Rhein-Neckar in Baden-Württemberg in Germany.

The town has three schools and 2 concert venues. Of the three places that have been offered as home of Dr. Faust, Helmstadt is the one mentioned in contemporary sources (in 1513 and 1528). The one other place given for Faust in contemporary sources is Heidelberg, but Mutianus Rufus in October 1513 mentions both Heidelberg and Helmstadt, apparently meaning Heidelberg to identify the general region. Contemporary sources therefore are consistent with Helmstadt being Faust's home.
