= Heiligkreuzsteinach =

- Municipality
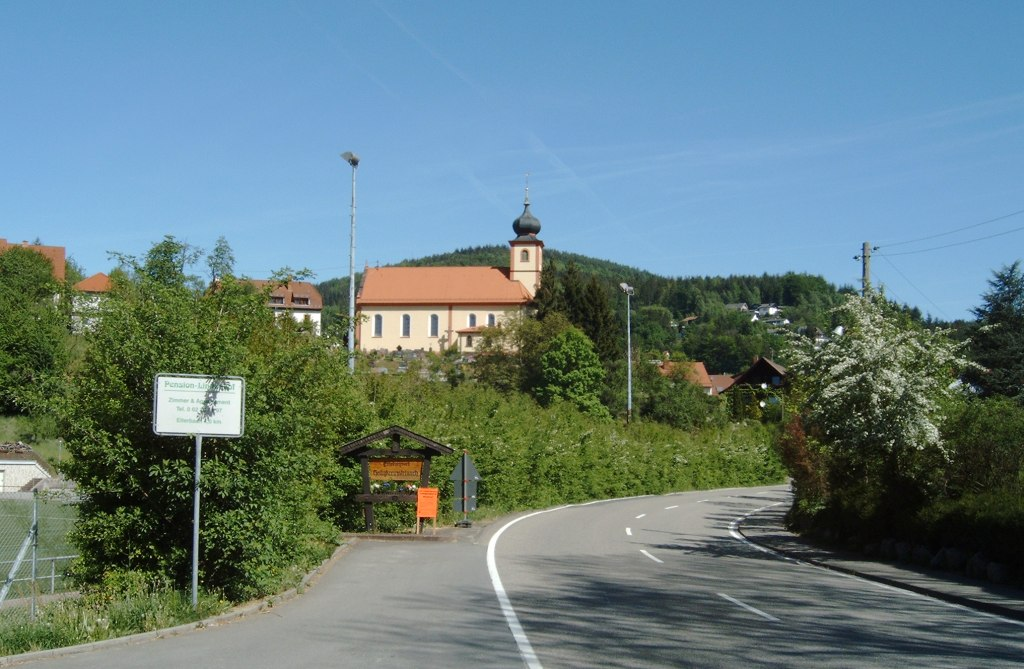
- Catholic church

- Coat of arms

- Location of Heiligkreuzsteinach within Rhein-Neckar-Kreis district
- Interactive map of Heiligkreuzsteinach
- Location within Germany Location within Baden-Württemberg
- Coordinates: 49°29′09″N 08°47′43″E
- Country: Germany
- State: Baden-Württemberg
- Admin. region: Karlsruhe
- District: Rhein-Neckar-Kreis
- Subdivisions: 7 Ortsteile

Government
  - Mayor (2020–28): Sieglinde Pfahl (CDU)

Area
  - Total: 19.61 km^{2} (7.57 sq mi)
- Elevation: 261 m (856 ft)

Population (2025-12-31)
  - Total: 2,588
  - Density: 132.0/km^{2} (341.8/sq mi)
- Time zone: UTC+01:00 (CET)
  - Summer (DST): UTC+02:00 (CEST)
- Postal codes: 69253
- Dialling codes: 06220
- Vehicle registration: HD
- Website: www.heiligkreuzsteinach.de

Heiligkreuzsteinach (German pronunciation: [haɪ̯lɪçkʁɔɪ̯t͡sˈʃtaɪ̯nax]) is a town in the district of Rhein-Neckar in Baden-Württemberg in Germany, about 25 km northeast of Heidelberg. From 1525 it was part of the Electoral Palatinate (German: Kurpfalz). With the end of the Electoral Palatinate in 1803 Heiligkreuzsteinach became part of Baden and after the union of Baden and Wurttemberg in 1952 it became part of the new established German State Baden-Württemberg.

American congressman Herman Lehlbach was from Heiligkreuzsteinach.
