= Gaiberg =

- Municipality
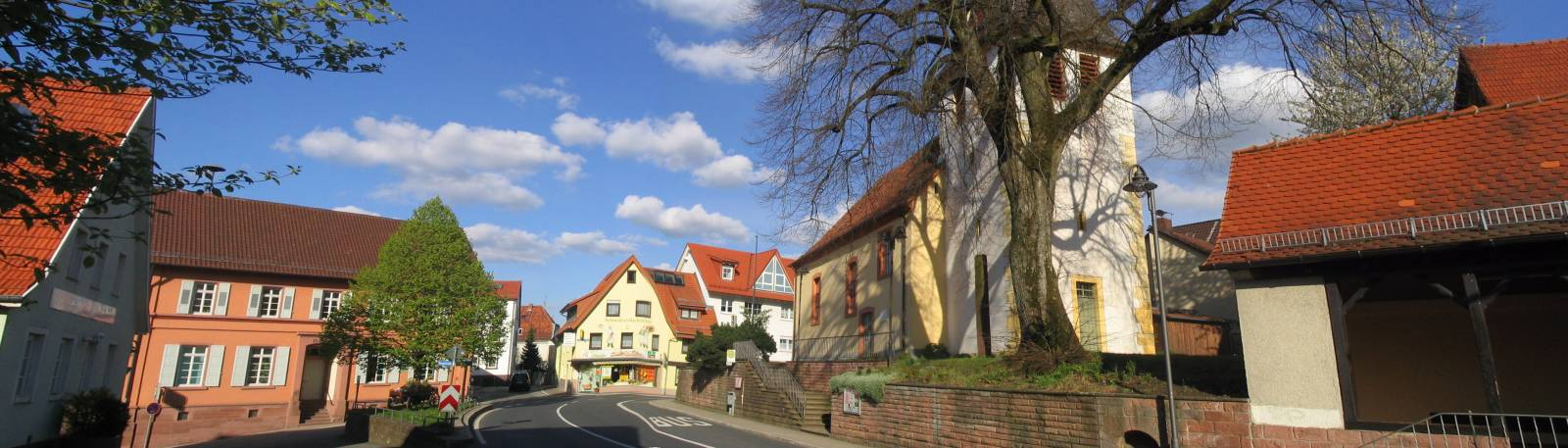
- Downtown Gaiberg with City Hall and the Protestant Church

- Coat of arms

- Location of Gaiberg within Rhein-Neckar-Kreis district
- Interactive map of Gaiberg
- Location within Germany Location within Baden-Württemberg
- Coordinates: 49°22′N 8°45′E
- Country: Germany
- State: Baden-Württemberg
- Admin. region: Karlsruhe
- District: Rhein-Neckar-Kreis

Government
  - Mayor (2018–26): Petra Müller-Vogel

Area
  - Total: 4.15 km^{2} (1.60 sq mi)
- Elevation: 293 m (961 ft)

Population (2025-12-31)
  - Total: 2,473
  - Density: 596/km^{2} (1,540/sq mi)
- Time zone: UTC+01:00 (CET)
  - Summer (DST): UTC+02:00 (CEST)
- Postal codes: 69251
- Dialling codes: 06223
- Vehicle registration: HD

Gaiberg (German pronunciation: [ˈɡaɪ̯ˌbɛʁk]) is a municipality in the Rhein-Neckar-Kreis of Baden-Württemberg.

== Geography ==
The state certified climatic health resort (Luftkurort) sits on the border of the Odenwald and the Kraichgau within the Neckartal-Odenwald nature park, about 10 km south of Heidelberg.

To the south of Gaiberg lies Leimen. To the north and west lies Heidelberg. To the east lies Bammental.

== History ==
The settlement which appeared in the late Middle Ages, was bought by the Electorate of the Palatinate in 1419. In 1803 Gaiberg became part of Baden.

== Government ==
Gaiberg belongs to the Neckargemünd municipal association. The seat of the municipal association is in Neckargemünd.

=== Municipal council ===
In addition to the chairperson and mayor, there are 12 councilors.

=== Coat of arms ===
The coat of arms is based on a court seal from 1751. It depicts a column next to a tree. The meaning of the symbols is not explained. In 1900 the municipality adopted the coat of arms at the suggestion of the General State Archiv.

The flag is green and white and was awarded by the Ministry of the Interior in 1956.

=== Sister cities ===
La Canourgue, France

== Economy and infrastructure ==
=== Transport ===
The municipality connect to the regional highway net by 8 km of state road to the exit Heidelberg/Schwetzingen of Bundesautobahn 5.

=== Education ===
In Gaiberg there is a primary and secondary school with a vocational school. Schools for further education can be found in Leimen and Heidelberg. There are Gymnasien in Neckargemünd and Bammental.
