= Schönbrunn (Baden) =

- Municipality
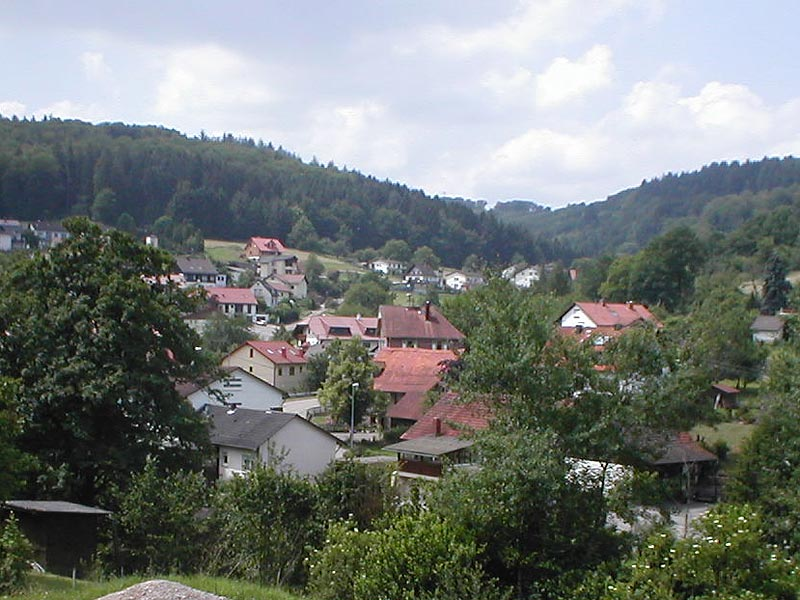

- Coat of arms

- Location of Schönbrunn within Rhein-Neckar-Kreis district
- Interactive map of Schönbrunn
- Location within Germany Location within Baden-Württemberg
- Coordinates: 49°24′42″N 08°55′39″E
- Country: Germany
- State: Baden-Württemberg
- Admin. region: Karlsruhe
- District: Rhein-Neckar-Kreis

Government
  - Mayor (2024–32): Jan Frey (CDU)

Area
  - Total: 34.47 km^{2} (13.31 sq mi)
- Elevation: 398 m (1,306 ft)

Population (2025-12-31)
  - Total: 2,868
  - Density: 83.20/km^{2} (215.5/sq mi)
- Time zone: UTC+01:00 (CET)
  - Summer (DST): UTC+02:00 (CEST)
- Postal codes: 69436
- Dialling codes: 06272, 06262, 06271
- Vehicle registration: HD
- Website: www.gemeinde-schoenbrunn.de

Schönbrunn (German pronunciation: [ˈʃøːnbʁʊn]; Palatine German: Schääbrunn) is a municipality in the Rhein-Neckar district, Baden-Württemberg, Germany. It consists of the villages Allemühl, Haag, Moosbrunn, Schönbrunn and Schwanheim. It is situated in the southern part of the Odenwald hills, south of the river Neckar. Schönbrunn lies about 7 km southwest of Eberbach and 18 km east of Heidelberg.

== Transport ==
The nearest train stations are in Hirschhorn and Eberbach, on the Neckar Valley Railway. Buses of the Verkehrsverbund Rhein-Neckar connect Schönbrunn with Eberbach, Mosbach and Heidelberg.
