= Rauenberg, Kraichgau =

Rauenberg
- Town
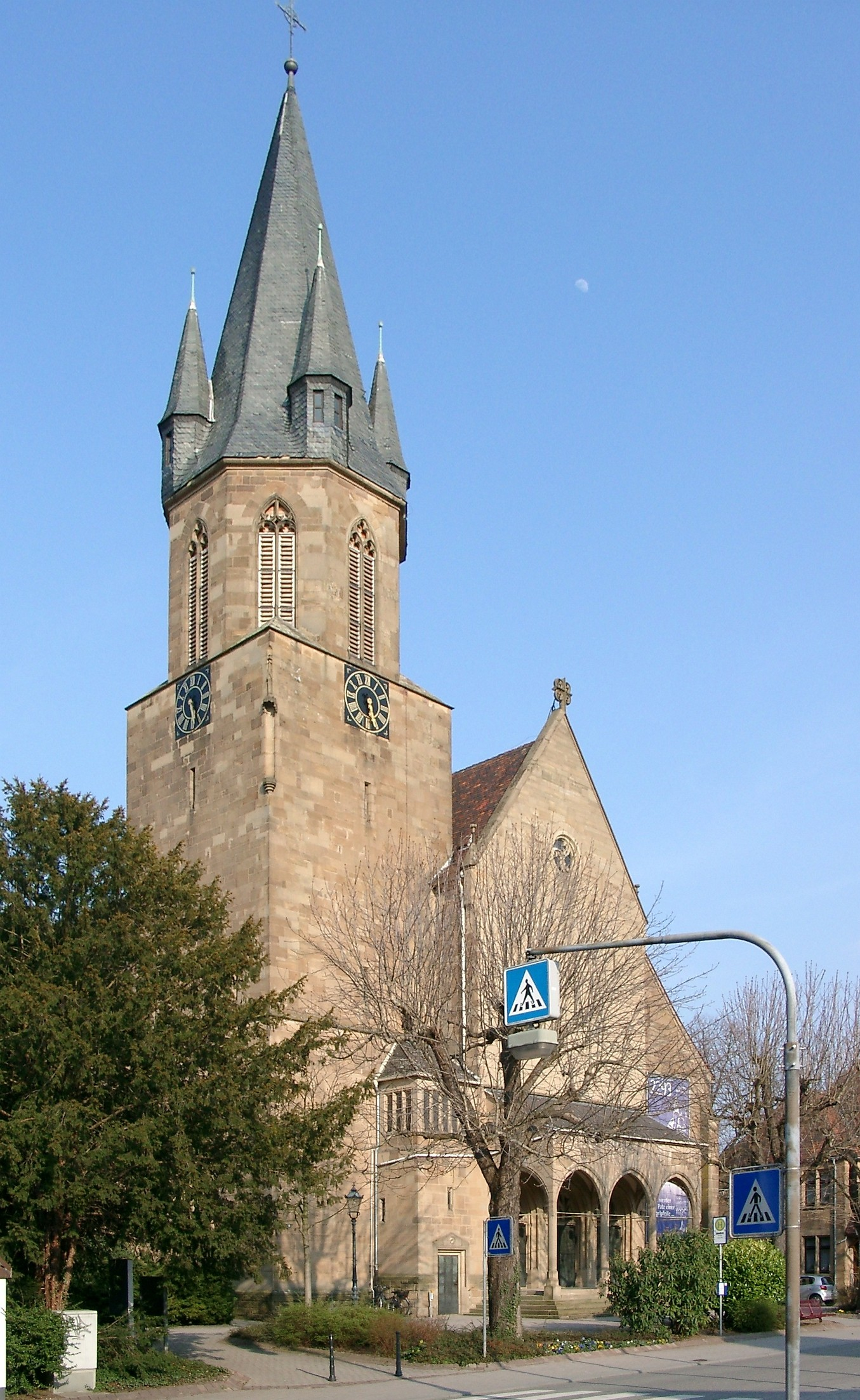
- Saint Peter and Paul Church

- Coat of arms

- Location of Rauenberg within Rhein-Neckar-Kreis district
- Interactive map of Rauenberg
- Location within Germany Location within Baden-Württemberg
- Coordinates: 49°16′04″N 08°42′13″E
- Country: Germany
- State: Baden-Württemberg
- Admin. region: Karlsruhe
- District: Rhein-Neckar-Kreis

Government
  - Mayor (2023–31): Peter Seithel

Area
  - Total: 11.12 km^{2} (4.29 sq mi)
- Elevation: 132 m (433 ft)

Population (2025-12-31)
  - Total: 8,701
  - Density: 782.5/km^{2} (2,027/sq mi)
- Time zone: UTC+01:00 (CET)
  - Summer (DST): UTC+02:00 (CEST)
- Postal codes: 69227–69231
- Dialling codes: 06222, 07253
- Vehicle registration: HD
- Website: www.rauenberg.de

Rauenberg (German pronunciation: [ˈʁaʊənˌbɛʁk]) is a town in the district of Rhein-Neckar-Kreis, in Baden-Württemberg, Germany. It is situated 15 km south of Heidelberg.
