= Reichartshausen =

- Municipality
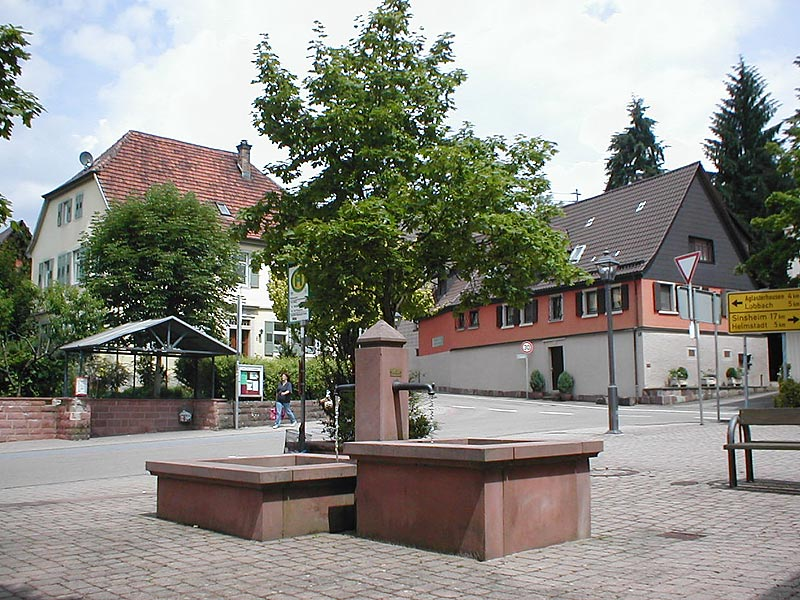
- Centre of the village

- Coat of arms

- Location of Reichartshausen within Rhein-Neckar-Kreis district
- Interactive map of Reichartshausen
- Location within Germany Location within Baden-Württemberg
- Coordinates: 49°21′25″N 08°56′40″E
- Country: Germany
- State: Baden-Württemberg
- Admin. region: Karlsruhe
- District: Rhein-Neckar-Kreis

Government
  - Mayor (2018–26): Gunter Jungmann

Area
  - Total: 10.00 km^{2} (3.86 sq mi)
- Elevation: 228 m (748 ft)

Population (2025-12-31)
  - Total: 2,158
  - Density: 215.8/km^{2} (558.9/sq mi)
- Time zone: UTC+01:00 (CET)
  - Summer (DST): UTC+02:00 (CEST)
- Postal codes: 74934
- Dialling codes: 06262
- Vehicle registration: HD
- Website: www.reichartshausen.de

Reichartshausen is a municipality in the district of Rhein-Neckar in Baden-Württemberg in Germany. The municipality is fully independent and administratively self-governing.
