= Lobbach =

- Municipality
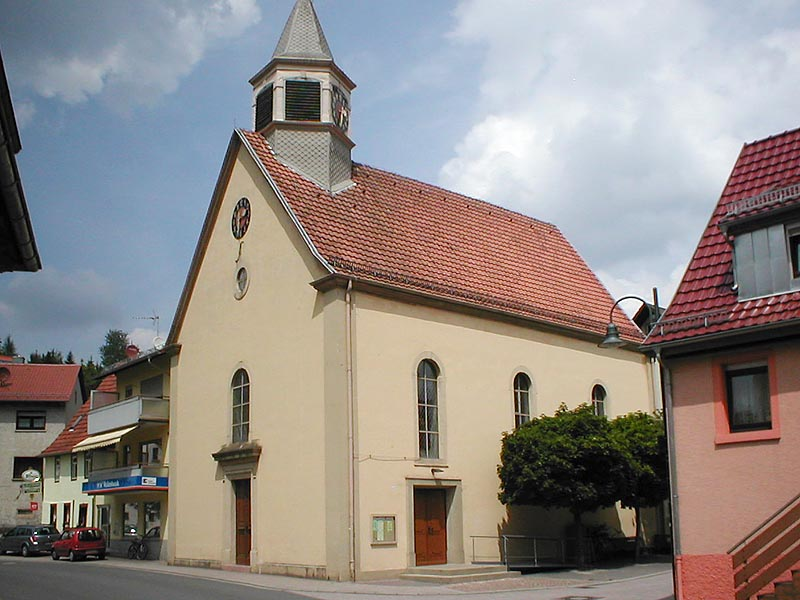
- Protestant Church

- Coat of arms

- Location of Lobbach within Rhein-Neckar-Kreis district
- Interactive map of Lobbach
- Location within Germany Location within Baden-Württemberg
- Coordinates: 49°22′33″N 08°53′33″E
- Country: Germany
- State: Baden-Württemberg
- Admin. region: Karlsruhe
- District: Rhein-Neckar-Kreis

Government
  - Mayor (2023–31): Florian Rutsch

Area
  - Total: 14.91 km^{2} (5.76 sq mi)
- Elevation: 216 m (709 ft)

Population (2025-12-31)
  - Total: 2,338
  - Density: 156.8/km^{2} (406.1/sq mi)
- Time zone: UTC+01:00 (CET)
  - Summer (DST): UTC+02:00 (CEST)
- Postal codes: 74931
- Dialling codes: 06226
- Vehicle registration: HD
- Website: www.lobbach.de

Lobbach is a municipality in the district of Rhein-Neckar in Baden-Württemberg in Germany.

== Demographics ==
Population development:

Year	Inhabitants
1990	2,221
2001	2,446
2011	2,346
2021	2,353
