= Epfenbach =

- Municipality
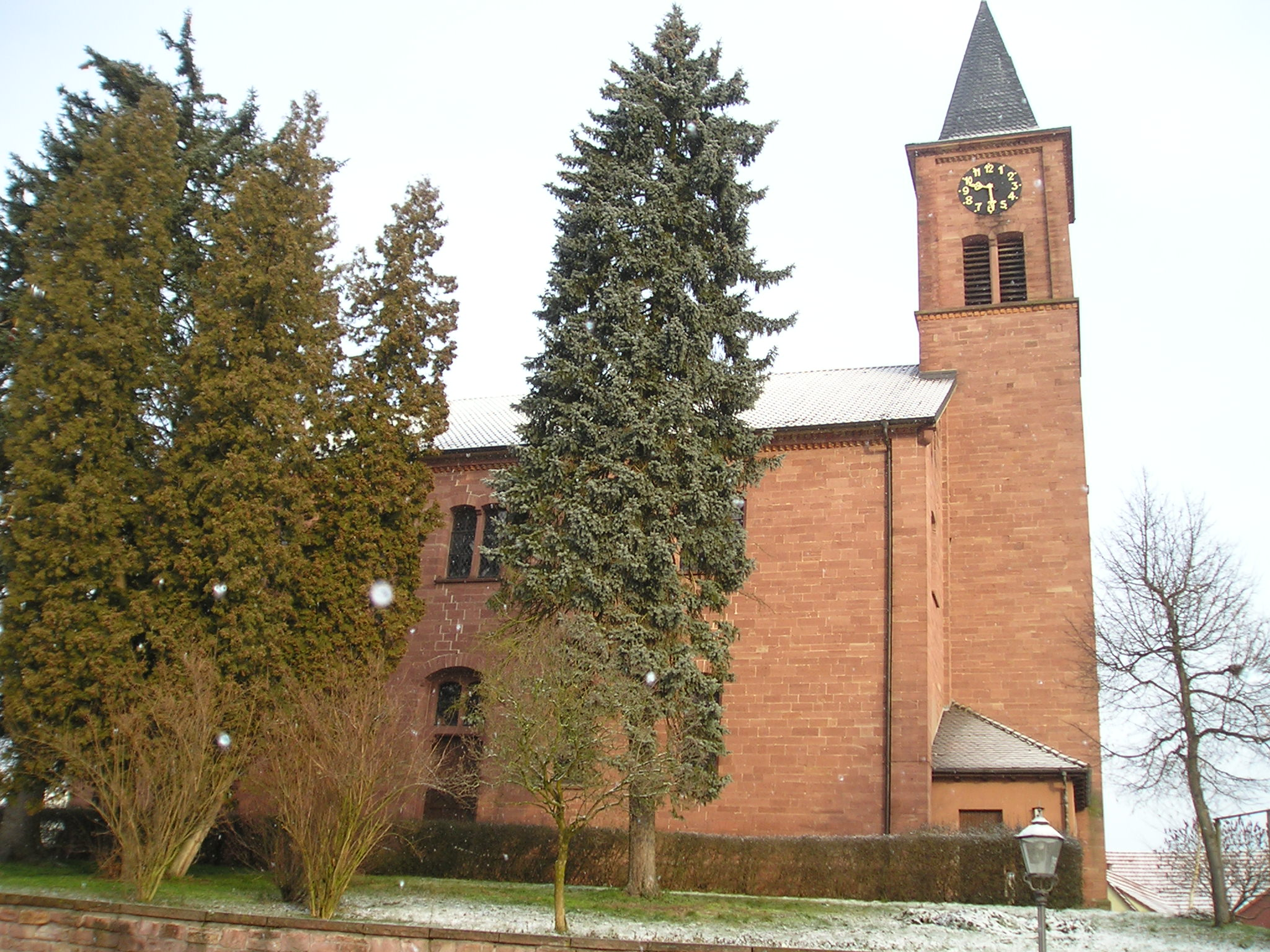
- Protestant Church

- Coat of arms

- Location of Epfenbach within Rhein-Neckar-Kreis district
- Interactive map of Epfenbach
- Location within Germany Location within Baden-Württemberg
- Coordinates: 49°20′N 8°54′E
- Country: Germany
- State: Baden-Württemberg
- Admin. region: Karlsruhe
- District: Rhein-Neckar-Kreis

Government
  - Mayor (2023–31): Pascal Wasow (SPD)

Area
  - Total: 12.97 km^{2} (5.01 sq mi)
- Elevation: 212 m (696 ft)

Population (2025-12-31)
  - Total: 2,451
  - Density: 189.0/km^{2} (489.4/sq mi)
- Time zone: UTC+01:00 (CET)
  - Summer (DST): UTC+02:00 (CEST)
- Postal codes: 74925
- Dialling codes: 07263
- Vehicle registration: HD
- Website: www.epfenbach.de

Epfenbach is a municipality in south western Germany. It is located between Heidelberg and Sinsheim in the Rhein-Neckar district in the state of Baden-Württemberg. The municipality belongs to the municipal association of Waibstadt and the tourist region Brunnenregion (Water Spring Region).

The meaning of the name Epfenbach is disputed. It could be derived from a person or plant name.

== Geography ==
Epfenbach is in Kraichgau on the edge of the little Odenwald.

== History ==
Epfenbach first appears in documents in the year 1286 as Epphinbach on a bestowal document of the Schönau Abbey. In 1325, the manor was sold to the Archbishopric of Mainz and then resold in 1344 to the knight Engelhard von Hirschhorn. In the centuries to follow, ownership of the manor changed often. In 1622, Count Tilly burned down the village. In 1643, the Johannes-Kirche (Church of Saint John) in Epfenbach was besieged by 400 horsemen of Lorraine. Legend has it that the Schultheiß at the time, one Hans Dengel, was shot in the head and killed during this siege. By end of the Thirty Years' War, only 15 of the 72 original inhabitants still lived in the village. In 1796, Carl Ullmann was born. Carl was named by the Grand Duke of Baden as prelate and director of the high church council of the State Church of Baden in 1857. In 1799, the village was plundered by French troops. Later in 1812, citizens of Epfenbach took part in the French invasion of Russia (1812) under Napoleon. At least Chr. Zapf came back alive. Two years after the union of Lutheran churches in Baden (Evangelischen Kirchenunion) in 1823, the reformed and the Lutheran schools were combined. In 1876, the Simultanschule was instituted.

== Government ==
=== Municipal council ===
The municipal council includes 12 members in addition to the chairperson and the mayor.

Municipal Council
Party	Votes	Seats
CDU	%	4
Independent Freie Wähler Verein (FWV)	%	4
SPD	%	4
Voter Participation: %

=== Coat of arms ===
The coat of arms is derived from a court seal which has been shown to have been first used 1752. The apple and wavy bar suggest the local folklore referring to the origin of the name has some truth to it. In 1901 the municipality adopted the coat of arms.

The flag is blue and white and was awarded in 1978.

== Culture and sights ==
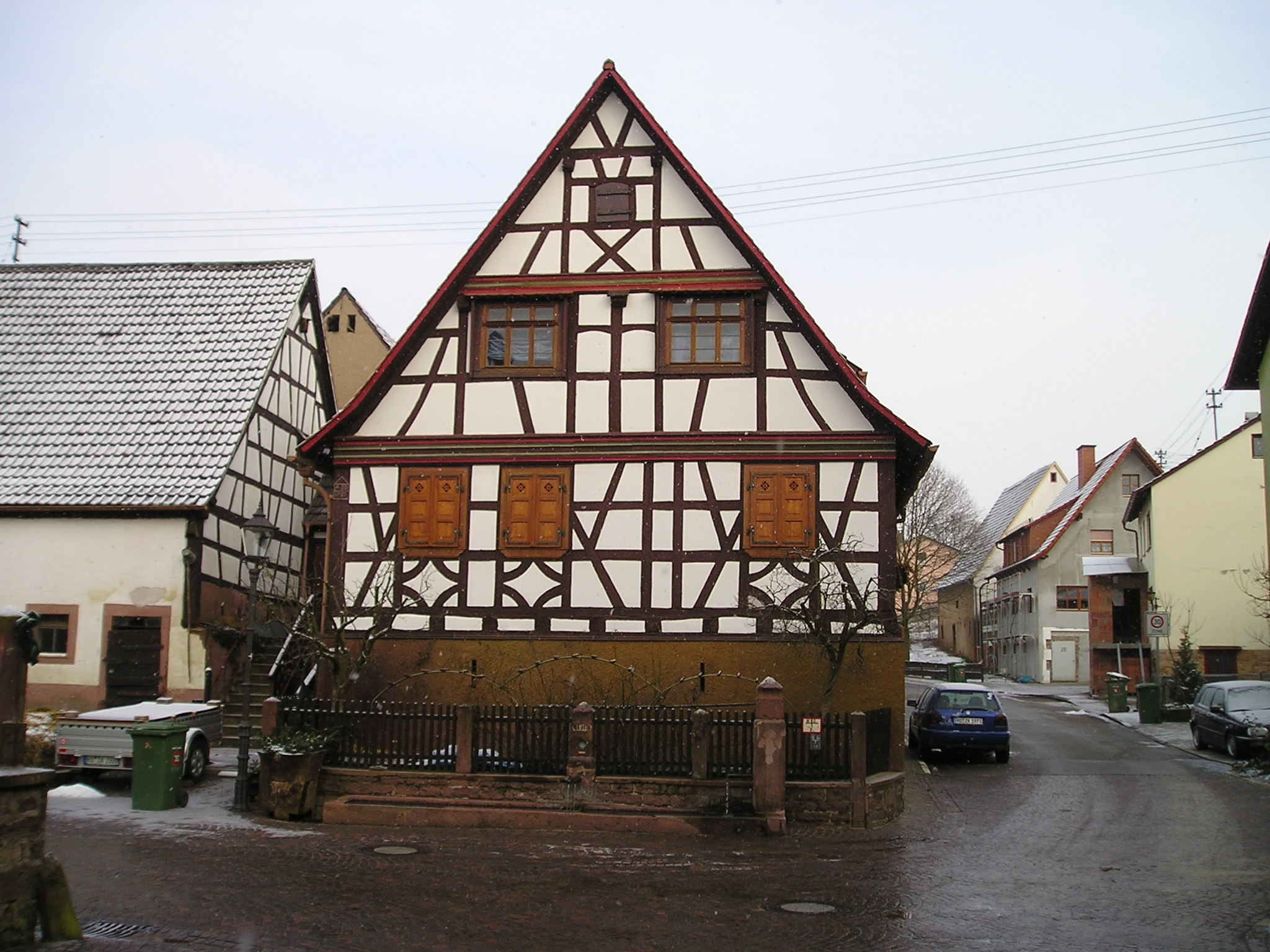
Half-Timber House in Epfenbach

The Epfenbach Museum of Local History shows how a farm household looked around the year 1850. Displayed are things such as the clothes and tools of the local farmers and craftsmen. The museum is located in a classic restored half-timbered house belonging to a former overseer from the abbey in the year 1718.

== Economy and infrastructure ==
=== Transport ===
Epfenbach sits on the L 530 state road. You can reach the A6 autobahn over Waibstadt and Sinsheim

=== Education ===
In Epfenbach there are the following schools:

- Merian-Schule
- A primary school
- A secondary school with a trade school (Werkrealschule)

Continuing schools can be found in Waibstadt, Neckarbischofsheim, and Sinsheim.

== Notable natives ==
- 1796, Carl Christian Ullmann, Protestant Theologian
- 1939, Werner Fischer, former director of the Hochschule Karlsruhe – Technik und Wirtschaft (a university of applied sciences)
