= Neidenstein =

- Municipality
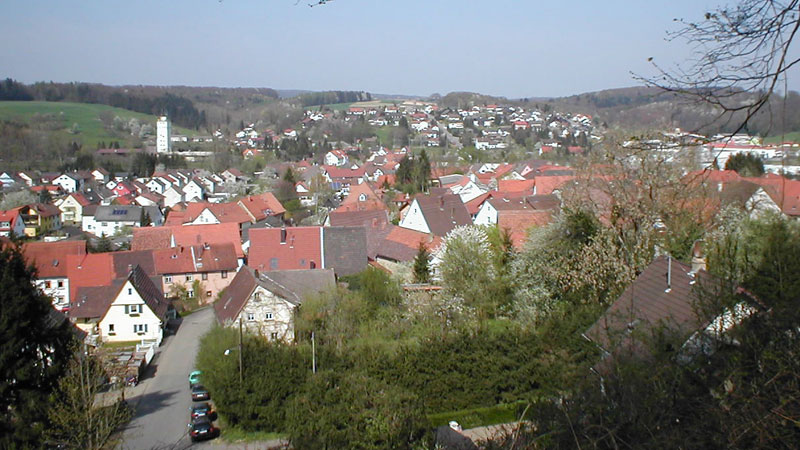
- View of the town

- Coat of arms

- Location of Neidenstein within Rhein-Neckar-Kreis district
- Interactive map of Neidenstein
- Location within Germany Location within Baden-Württemberg
- Coordinates: 49°19′N 08°53′E
- Country: Germany
- State: Baden-Württemberg
- Admin. region: Karlsruhe
- District: Rhein-Neckar-Kreis

Government
  - Mayor (2021–29): Frank Gobernatz

Area
  - Total: 8.48 km^{2} (3.27 sq mi)
- Elevation: 173 m (568 ft)

Population (2025-12-31)
  - Total: 1,759
  - Density: 207/km^{2} (537/sq mi)
- Time zone: UTC+01:00 (CET)
  - Summer (DST): UTC+02:00 (CEST)
- Postal codes: 74933
- Dialling codes: 07263
- Vehicle registration: HD
- Website: www.neidenstein.de

Neidenstein is a village and a municipality in south western Germany. It is located between Heidelberg and Sinsheim in the Rhein-Neckar district in the state of Baden-Württemberg.

== History ==
In 1319 Neidenstein was founded by Heinrich von Venningen. Until Neidenstein became a part of Baden in 1805 it belonged to the family of the Lords of Venningen.

== Demographics ==
Population development:

Year	Inhabitants
1990	1,535
2001	1,864
2011	1,835
2021	1,756
