= Eschelbronn =

- Municipality
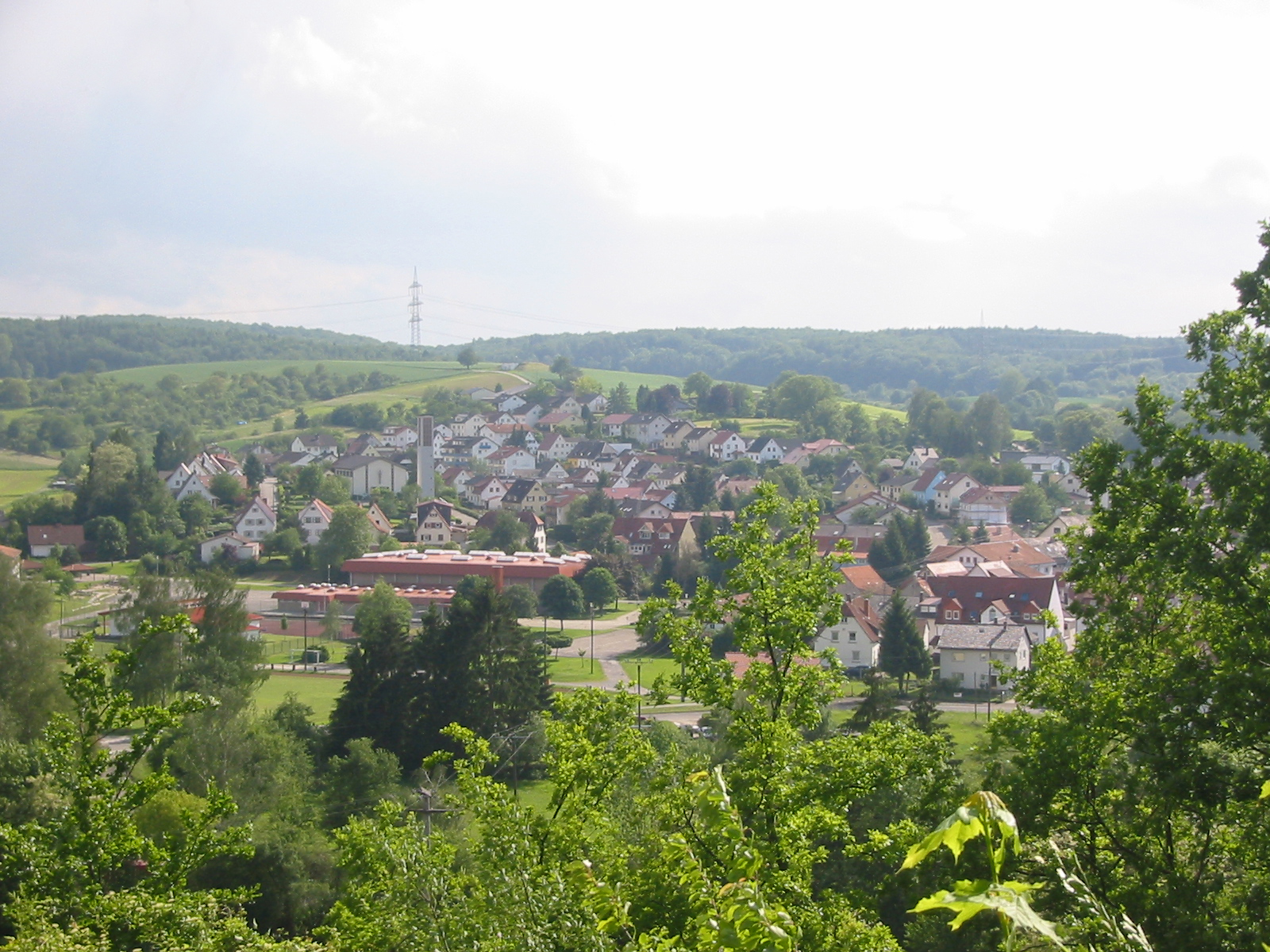
- View of the town

- Coat of arms

- Location of Eschelbronn within Rhein-Neckar-Kreis district
- Interactive map of Eschelbronn
- Location within Germany Location within Baden-Württemberg
- Coordinates: 49°19′11″N 08°51′59″E
- Country: Germany
- State: Baden-Württemberg
- Admin. region: Karlsruhe
- District: Rhein-Neckar-Kreis

Government
  - Mayor (2023–31): Marco Siesing

Area
  - Total: 8.24 km^{2} (3.18 sq mi)
- Elevation: 156 m (512 ft)

Population (2025-12-31)
  - Total: 2,761
  - Density: 335/km^{2} (868/sq mi)
- Time zone: UTC+01:00 (CET)
  - Summer (DST): UTC+02:00 (CEST)
- Postal codes: 74927
- Dialling codes: 06226
- Vehicle registration: HD
- Website: www.eschelbronn.de

Eschelbronn is a village with 2,758 inhabitants (2022) in the Rhein-Neckar district of Baden-Württemberg, Germany. It is adjacent to Sinsheim.

== History ==
Eschelbronn was already mentioned in the year 788/789 in a deed of donation from the monastery of Lorsch. In the end of the 13th century it became property of the diocese of Speyer. In 1267 a castle of wood was built and later in 1375 was transformed to a moated castle of stone. In 1526 the population were converted to Lutheranism. In 1803 Eschelbronn became a part of Baden. 1807 the village joined the district of Waibstadt and was assigned 1813 to the district of Sinsheim, which in the year 1973 became the Rhine Neckar Area.

== Economy ==
In former times the main income source from the inhabitants was agriculture, however later in the 18th century the weaving mill of lines became more and more important. Since the end of the 19th century Eschelbronn is well known for its furniture manufacturing industry.
