= Carl Philipp von Venningen =

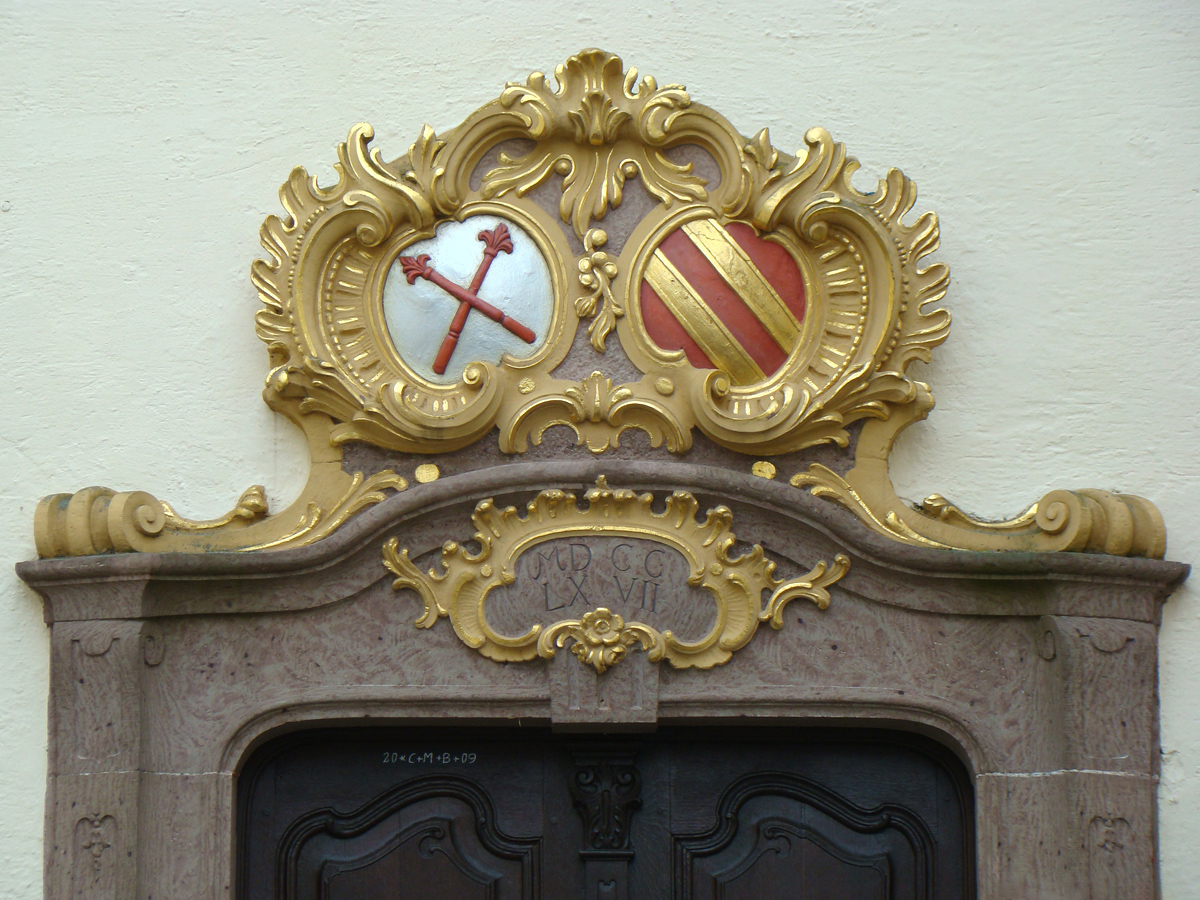
Coats of arms in alliance at Schloss Eichtersheim. On left: arms of Carl Philipp von Venningen. At right: arms of his wife Maria Anna von Hutten

Carl Philipp von Venningen (1728 – 27 August 1797) was an imperial knight from the family of the Lords of Venningen. He was chief minister of Electoral Palatinate. As a child, he was the last living male descendant of the von Venningen family and so he inherited the whole family estate at Kraichgau, where he left his mark at Eichtersheim and elsewhere through an extensive building programme.

== Family ==
Carl Philipp belonged to the Catholic branch of the Venninger. His grandfather, Johann Augustin von Venningen (died 1713) converted to Catholicism, while the latter's brother, Eberhard Friedrich von Venningen (1642–1710), remained Protestant. Carl Philipp was the son of Carl Ferdinand von Venningen (1693–1731) and Elisabeth Claudia Reich von Reichenstein. His brother, Christian von Venningen, died in 1731, as a child. His sister, Maria Anna, married Carl Ferdinand von Hatzfeld in 1754 and was the mother of the Prussian general, Franz Ludwig von Hatzfeldt.

Carl Philipp von Venningen was the only male heir of the Venningen family, since all other male lines of the family had died out, his father died early, and his brother died as a boy (in the same year as his father). As a result, Carl Philipp inherited the whole family estate at the age of three. His mother was installed as his legal guardian and regent. In 1743, she married for a second time to Christoph Philipp von Erthal, an amtmann of the Electorate of Mainz and director of the Lohrer mirror factory, becoming step-mother to his children, who included the later prince-bishops Friedrich Karl Joseph von Erthal and Franz Ludwig von Erthal. The Lohr local historian Karlheinz Bartels proposed that one of her step-daughters, Maria Sophia Margarethe Catharina, was the inspiration for Snow White.

In 1750, Carl Philipp married Maria Anna von Hutten zu Stolzenberg (died 1781), a great-aunt of Franz Christoph von Hutten zum Stolzenberg, prince-bishop of Speyer and cardinal. Between 1751 and 1767, the pair had a dozen children. One son, Franz Anton (1763-1799) founded the "Eichtersheim line", which died out in 1907, and another, Friedrich Anton von Venningen (1765-1832) founded the "Grombach line" which survives to this day.

== Life ==
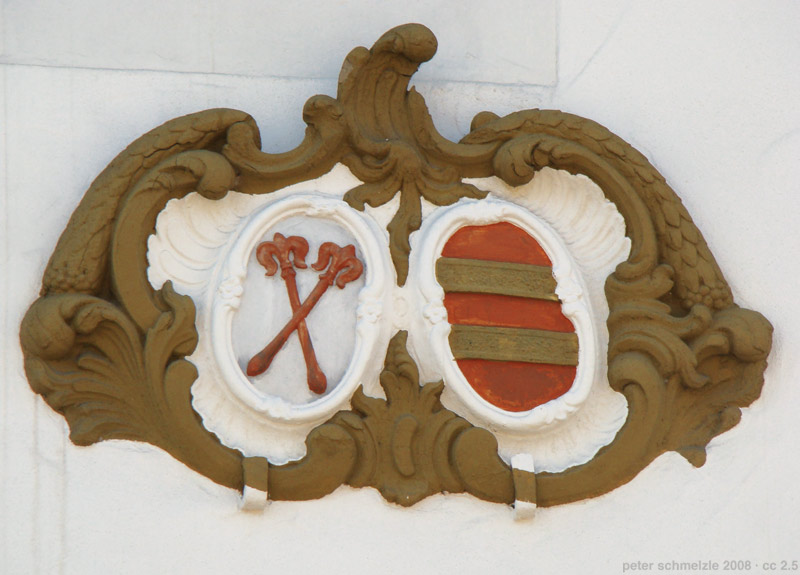
Paired coats of arms at the Weiler House

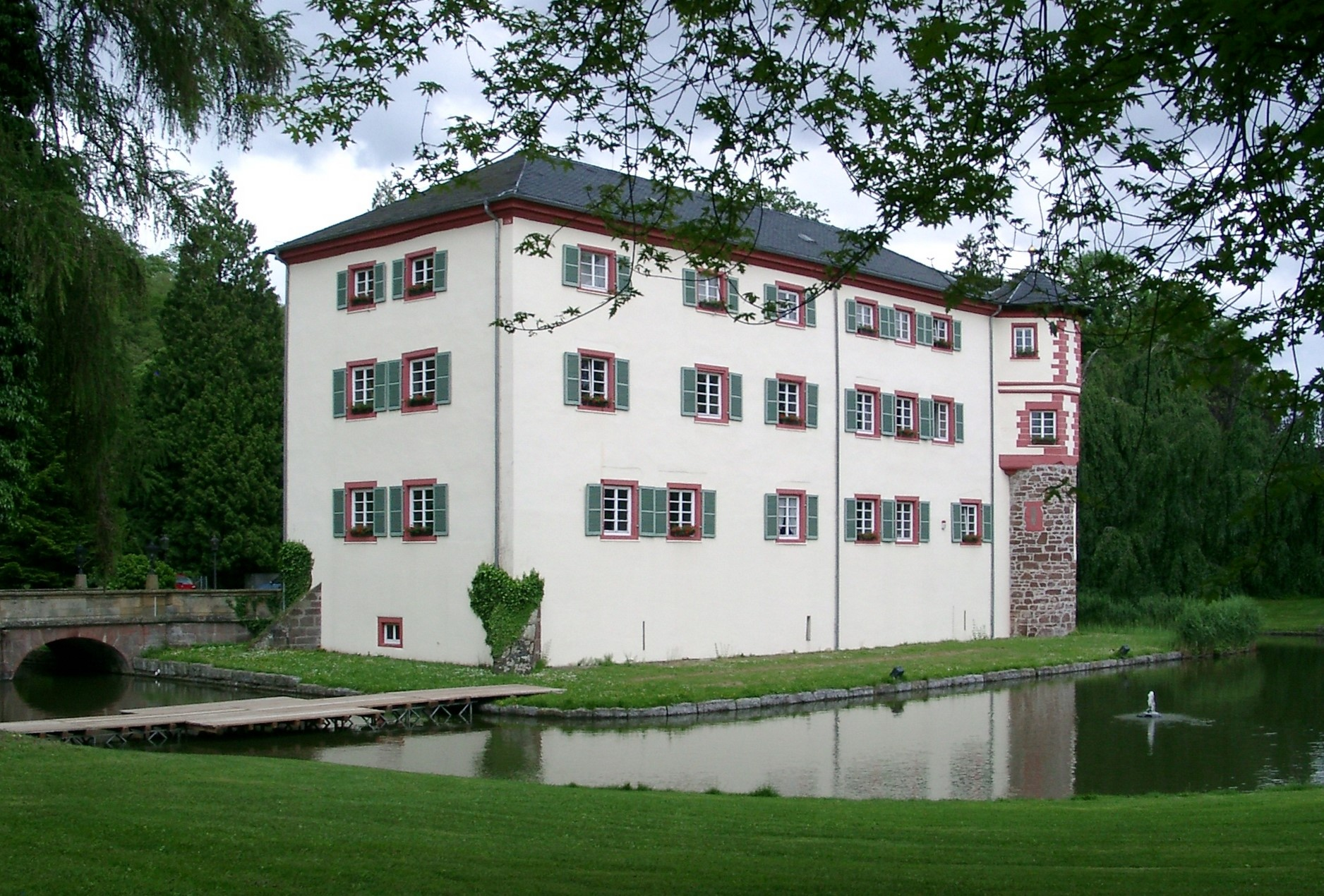
View of Schloss Eichtersheim with moat and bridge.

After studying jurisprudence, Carl Philipp became a chamber and court judge in Mannheim and in 1750 he was admitted to the noble governing council of Electoral Palatinate with a seat and a vote. Then he was promoted to the upper appellate court in Mannheim. In 1765 he became chief minister of the government. In the same year he was also made Oberamtmann for Kreuznach. For these positions, he received the salary without having to be personally involved or present. He lived in his palace at Eichtersheim and a townhouse in Mannheim. From 1786 until 1796, he was senior curator of Heidelberg University. In 1791, Carl Philipp sold his palace in Mannheim and in the following years he retreated from his public roles even more.

Between 1767 and 1781, Carl Philipp had a water castle built at Eichtersheim, then the pension office in 1779, and the Catholic Eichtersheim schloss church in 1782. In addition, he bought Schloss Agnestal at Zuzenhausen, which he had completed, and he built Schloss Eschelbronn and Weiler House in Sinsheim. He was patron of St. Anna's chapel. Over the course of his life, Carl Philipp expanded the family property which he had inherited through further acquisitions and he had rights of possession in the following villages: Grombach, Hilsbach, Mühlhausen, Rappenau und Spechbach. To prevent inheritance disputes, which had been common in the Venningen family, he established a family trust in 1790.

Carl Philipp von Venningen died on 27 August 1797 and was interred in the crypt of the Catholic schloss church in Eichtersheim, which he had had built between 1777 until 1782.

== Honours ==
- 1787 Order of Saint Hubert
- 1790 Order of the Palatine Lion

== Bibliography ==
- Meinhold Lurz: Die Freiherren von Venningen. Herausgegeben vom Heimatverein Kraichgau e. V. (Sonderveröffentlichung Nr. 17), Sinsheim 1997, ISBN 3-921214-13-0, pp. 783–790.
