= Eberhard Friedrich von Venningen =

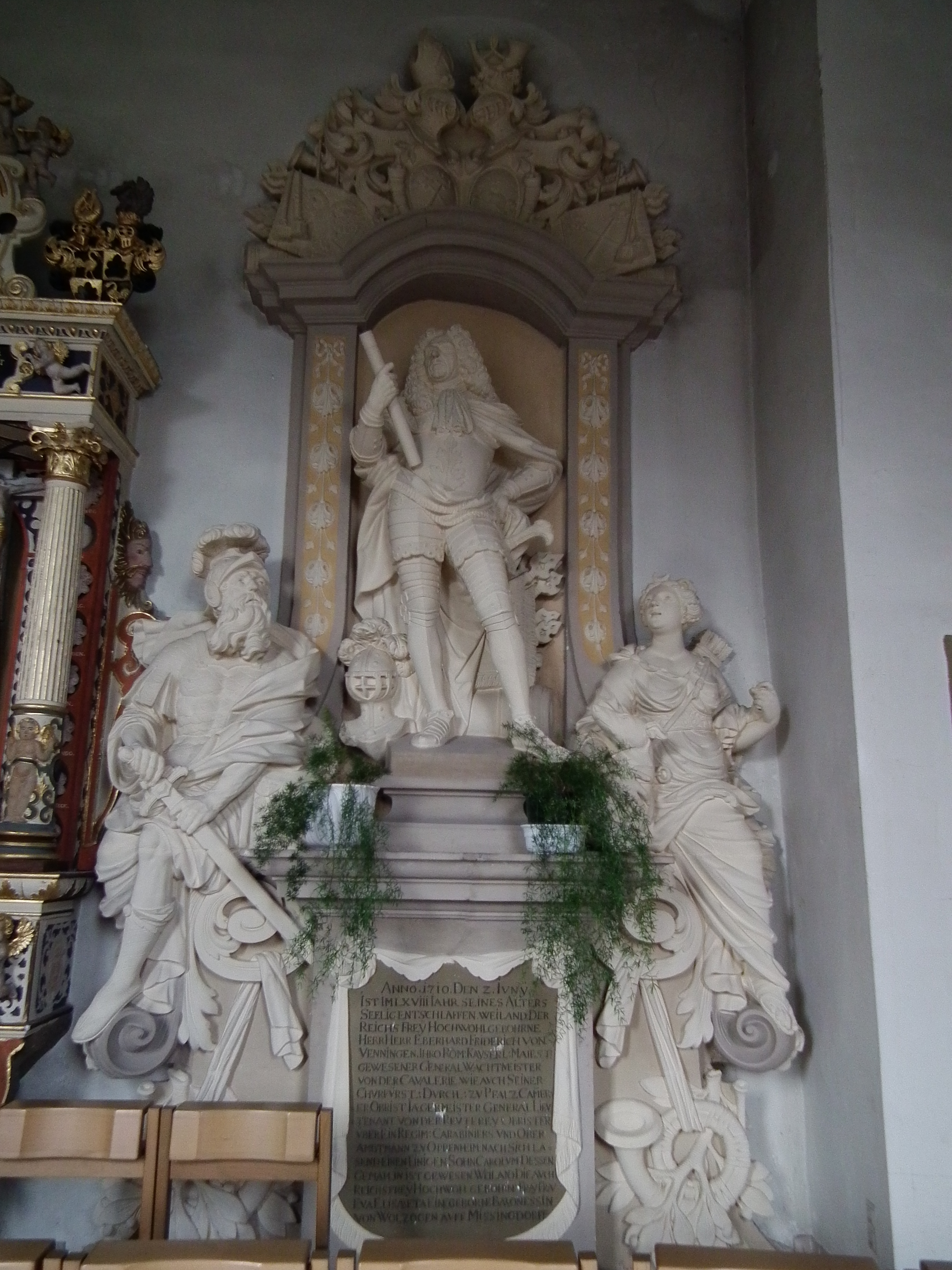
Epitaph of Eberhard Friedrich von Venningen in the Protestant church of Neidenstein

Eberhard Friedrich von Venningen (1642 - 2 June 1710) was a lieutenant general of Electoral Palatinate and senior amtmann of Oppenheim, who derived from the Alsace line of the Venningen family. He reclaimed the castle and town of Grombach for his family and was responsible for the construction of the Haus zum Riesen in Heidelberg.

== Life ==
Eberhard Friedrich von Venningen was the son of the Electorate's hunting master, Philipp Ludwig von Venningen (died 1678), and Maria Catharina von Rathsamhausen. At that time, the family had a high position in the Electorate's court and Eberhard entered the service of Elector Charles Louis. His sister Anna Eleonore von Venningen, who married Georg Gottfried von Rathsamhausen, was a lady-in-waiting to Charles Louis' daughter, Elizabeth Charlotte. In her letters, Eberhard Friedrich is mentioned frequently. He participated in a hunt with greyhounds in 1669.

In 1678, von Venningen was a master of the hunt and in 1680 he became senior master of the hunt. That same year, he accompanied the Elector to England, where both were awarded the degree of doctor of medicine. In 1688, he became a Hauptmann and in 1693 a colonel in the Electorate's army. He was seriously wounded at the siege of Landau in 1702 and was promoted to lieutenant general in 1706.

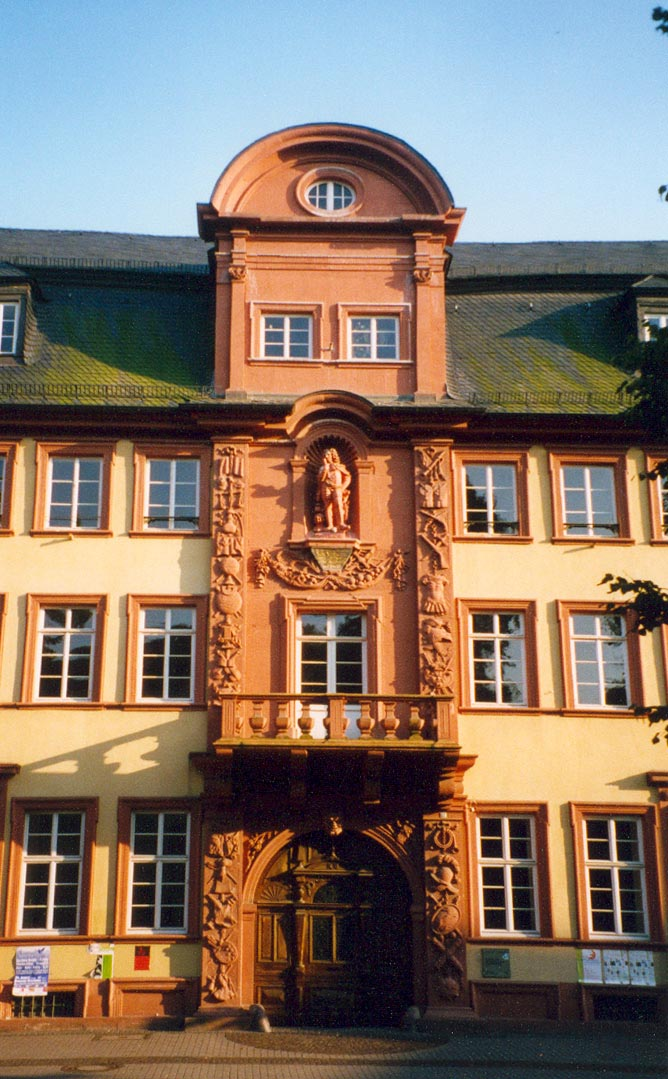
Haus zum Riesen in Heidelberg with the over life size statue of Venningen.

From 1672, he undertook long negotiations on behalf of his family with the Raitz von Frentz family, regarding the castle and town of Grombach, which the Venningen family had possessed from 1498 until the early seventeenth century, but had then passed out of their possession through inheritance in the female line. The dispute continued until 1798 and thus over several generations, but Eberhard Friedrich obtained a ruling of possession in 1697 and the return of Grombach to the Venningen family in 1702. Thereafter, his brother Philipp Egolph (died 1708) resided at Grombach castle.

In 1707, Eberhard Friederich had the Haus zum Riesen ("House of the Giant") built in Heidelberg. The architect was Johann Adam Breunig, who was also responsible for the Jesuit college and the Old University. With the express permission of the Elector, the house was partially built using stone from the "fat tower" of Heidelberg castle. The house owes its name to the over-life-size statue of von Venningen, which was made by Heinrich Charrasky and is located on the second story of the façade.

Eberhard Friedrich died on 2 June 1710 and was interred in the Protestant church in Neidenstein, the family's traditional resting place.

== Family ==
Eberhard Friedrich married Eva Elisabeth von Wolzogen at Missingdorf. The marriage resulted in his son Carl (1684-1718), named after his godmother Elisabeth Charlotte, Madame Palatine. Carl von Venningen was the Electorate's master of the hunt and the senior amtmann of Oppenheim. His only child was his daughter, Helena Elisabetha, who married Friedrich von und zu Thann, causing part of the Venningen possessions to pass to the Thann family after 1718.

Eberhard Friedrich's brother, Johann Augustin (died 1713) was the ancestor of all modern Venningens. His grandson Carl Philipp von Venningen (1728-1797) inherited all the family property and was the chief minister of the Electorate.

== Grave monument ==
Eberhard Friedrich's grave monument in the Protestant church in Neidenstein, which includes a life-size statue of him, was probably made by Heinrich Charrasky, who also made the statue on the Haus zum Riesen. The monument is flanked by statues of the war god Mars and the hunting goddess Diana, reflecting von Venningen's interests in war and hunting. The dedication gives Venningen's title as:

Ihro Röm. Kayserl. Maiest. gewesener Generalwachtmeister von der Cavalerie wie auch seiner Churfürstl. Durchl. zu Pfalz Camerer, Obristjägermeister, Generallieutenant von der Reuterey, Obrister über ein Regim. Carabiniers und Oberambtmann zu Oppenheim

"His Roman Imperial Majesty's sergeant general of the cavalry, as well as his Prince-Elector of the Palatinate's Camerer, senior master of the hunt, lieutenant general of the Reuterey, commander of a regiment of carabiniers and senior amtmann of Oppenheim."

== Bibliography ==
- Meinhold Lurz: Die Freiherren von Venningen. edited by Heimatverein Kraichgau (Sonderveröffentlichung Nr. 17), Sinsheim 1997, ISBN 3-921214-13-0, pp. 777–782.
- Stadt Bad Rappenau (ed.): Grunbach uff dem Creichgöw. Ein Heimatbuch. Beiträge zur Geschichte und Gegenwart von Grombach, dem westlichsten Stadtteil von Bad Rappenau. Bad Rappenau 2010, pp. 118–120.
