= Haus zum Riesen, Heidelberg =

Coordinates: 49°24′37.5804″N 8°41′53.1132″E

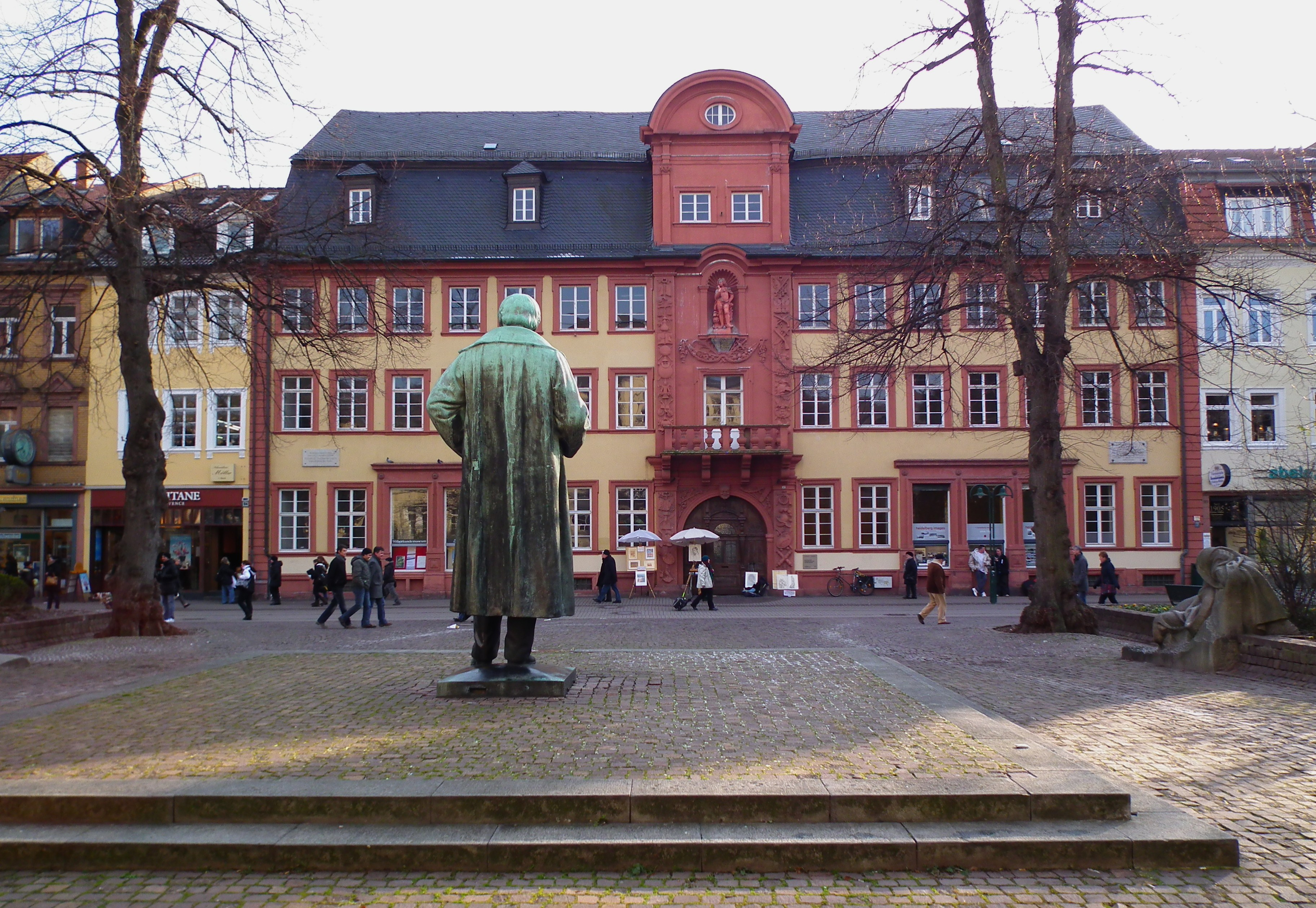
Das Haus zum Riesen, Hauptstraße 52 (Kulturdenkmal)

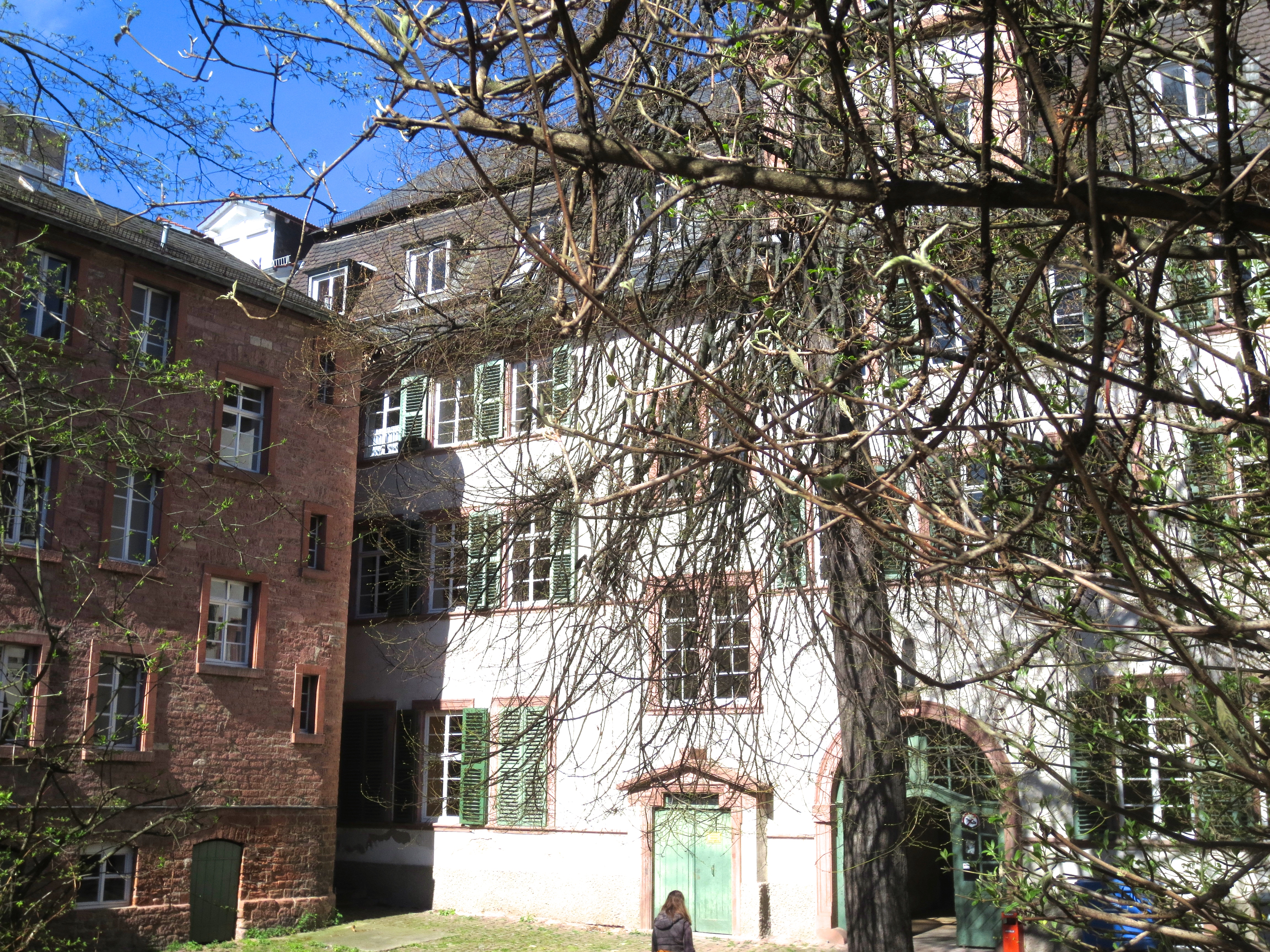
Courtyard and garden side of the palace with Anatomy Garden, western wing of the building, made of Odenwäld sandstone.

The Haus zum Riesen (German: House of the Giant) is a baroque palace on the Hauptstrasse in Heidelberg, built in 1707/8. The building is named for a statue with decorates the façade. Since the middle of the nineteenth century, it has been used by Heidelberg University and several prominent academics have worked in it.

== History ==
Before the house was built in 1707/8, the site was occupied by the Hotel "Zum Löwen." The builder of the new palace was Geheimrat, lieutenant general Eberhard Friedrich von Venningen. The architect was Johann Adam Breunig, who also designed the Heidelberg Jesuit college and the Old University.

With the express permission of the elector, the house was built using stone from the damaged "fat tower" of the Heidelberg Castle. The name, "House of the Giant", derives from the over life-size statue of von Venningen which was made by Heinrich Charrasky and stands on the second floor of the central facade. The structure is three stories tall and was the largest private residence in the city. After the acquisition of the building by Franz Betz in 1797, it was used as a guesthouse and brewery.

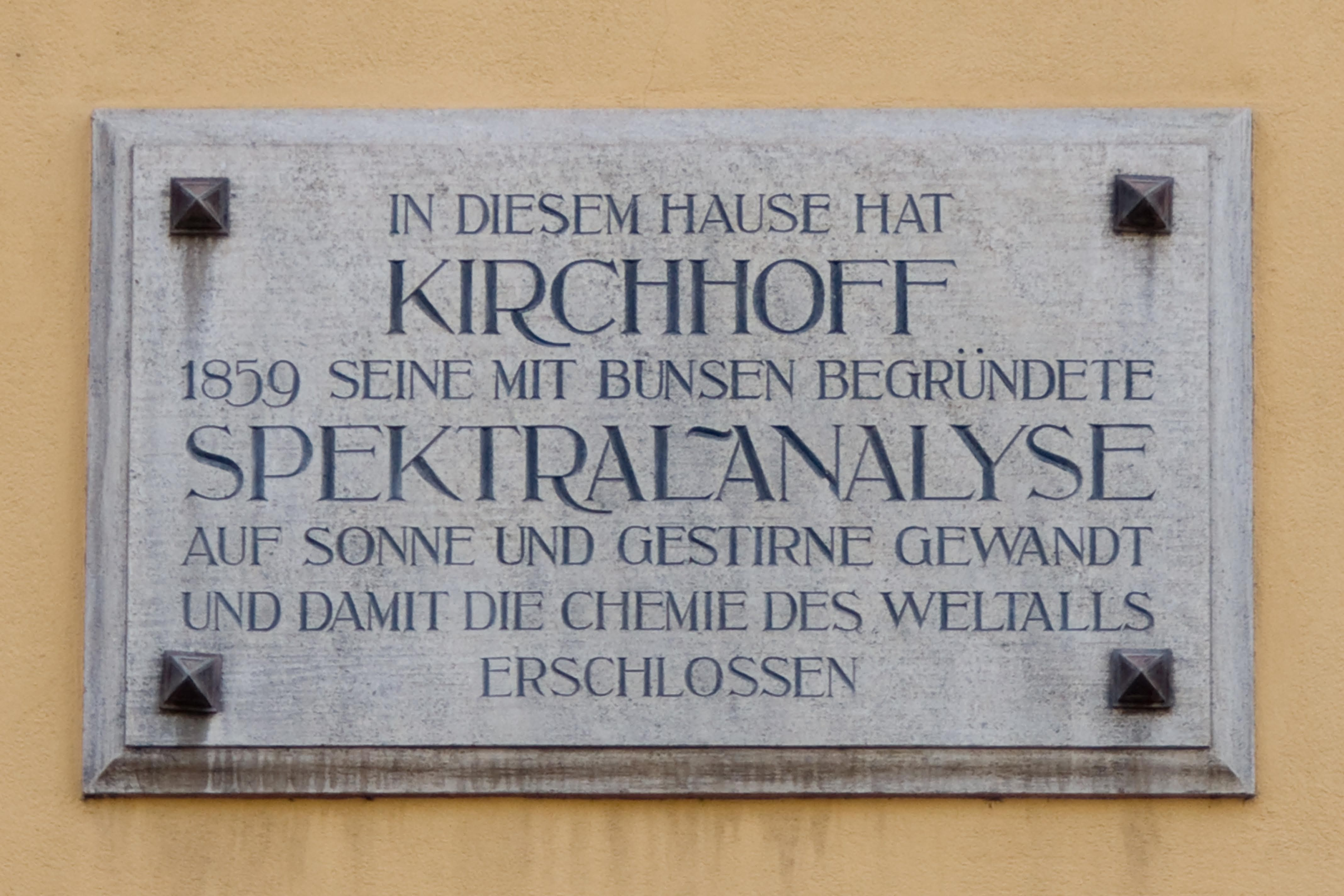
Commemorative plaque at the Haus zum Riesen.

Since the middle of the nineteenth century, the palace has been owned by Heidelberg University and various institutes have been based in the building. For example, the chemist Robert Bunsen and the physicist Gustav Kirchhoff researched spectral analysis here. The physiologist Hermann von Helmholtz, inventor of the ophthalmoscope, and the geologist Wilhelm Salomon-Calvi also worked in the building.

In the early twentieth century the Haus zum Riesen became the seat of university's institute of geology and palaeontology. Otto Schoetensack researched fossil finds here and in 1907/8, he described Mauer 1, the oldest remains of a prehistoric human then known from Europe, which he named Homo heidelbergensis. Other researchers who worked on the fossil included the Heidelberg zoologist, Otto Bütschli.

== Bibliography ==
- Melanie, Mertens (ed.): Kulturdenkmale in Baden-Württemberg – Stadtkreis Heidelberg: Denkmaltopographie Bundesrepublik Deutschland Band II.5.1. Jan Thorbecke Verlag, 2013, p. 525, ISBN 978-3-7995-0426-3.
- Bernd, Müller: Architekturführer Heidelberg – Bauten um 1000–2000. Stadt Heidelberg 1998.
