= Pierre Watier =

French general

Count of the Empire Pierre Watier
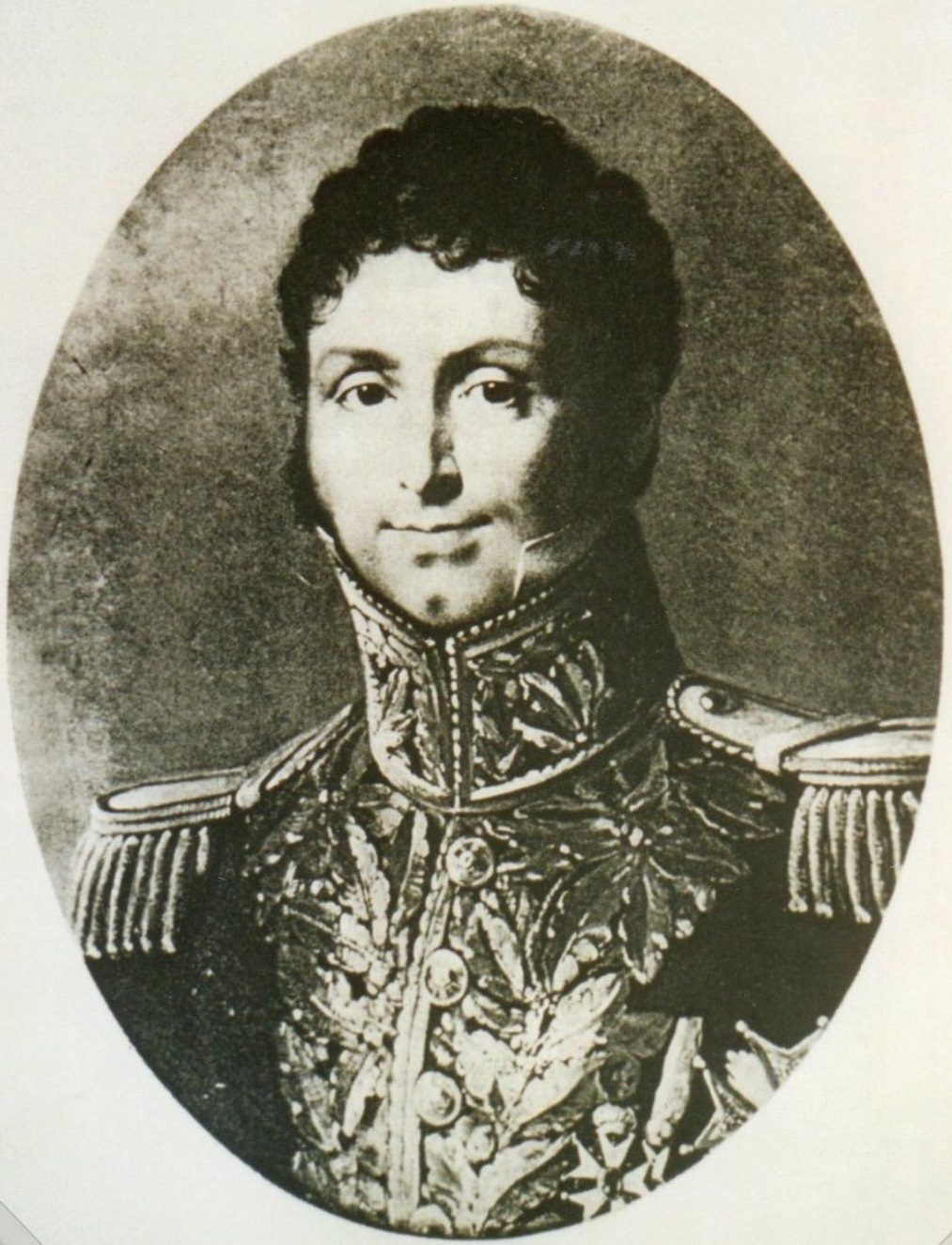
- Divisional general Pierre Watier.
- Born: 4 September 1770; Laon, France
- Died: 3 February 1846 (aged 75); Paris, France
- Military career
- Allegiance: Kingdom of France; Kingdom of France; French First Republic; First French Empire; Bourbon Restoration; July Monarchy
- Branch: Army
- Service years: 1790–1836
- Rank: Général de division
- Commands: Inspector General of the Gendarmerie; Cavalry Division of the Army of the North; Cavalry Division of the XIII Corps
- Conflicts: French Revolutionary Wars; Napoleonic Wars; War of the Third Coalition; Battle of Donauwörth; Battle of Dürenstein; War of the Fourth Coalition; Battle of Schleiz; Peninsular War; Battle of Gamonal; Siege of Saragossa (1809); Battle of Fuentes de Oñoro; French invasion of Russia; Battle of Borodino; War of the Sixth Coalition; Siege of Hamburg; Hundred Days; Battle of Waterloo
- Awards: Grand-Officier of the Legion of Honour; Knight's Cross of the Order of Saint Louis; Knight's Cross of the Order of the Lion of Bavaria; Count of the Empire

Pierre Watier or Pierre Wathier (4 September 1770 – 3 February 1846), was a French Army officer during the Napoleonic Wars. A career cavalryman and aide to Napoleon, he was eventually promoted to general officer. He fought in the War of the Fourth Coalition and the Peninsular War, and later led heavy cavalry divisions at Borodino and Waterloo. Born at Laon, Aisne, Watier is one of 660 persons to have their names inscribed under the Arc de Triomphe in Paris, the city where he died. WATHIER appears on Column 12 on the east side.

== Career ==
=== Early service ===
Pierre Watier was commissioned on 3 September 1790 as a second lieutenant in the 12th Chasseurs-a-Cheval Regiment, formerly of Champagne. He fought in the campaigns of 1792–94 in the Army of the North, and became a lieutenant of the 16th Chasseurs-a-Cheval Regiment on 26 May 1793. Promoted to captain on 14 August 1793 and to major on 18 November 1793, he then took part in the campaigns of 1794–96 in the Inland Army and of 1797–1800 in the Army of Batavia.

Watier was appointed colonel of the 4th Dragoons Regiment on 4 October 1799, to see action in the Gallo-Batavian Army theater of 1800 and 1801. Awarded with the Knight's cross of the Légion d'honneur on 11 December 1803 and Officer's cross on 14 June 1804, he was then deployed with the Grand Armée in 1805 to Austria. He distinguished himself at the battles of Donauwerth and Dürenstein, where he is taken as prisoner and later exchanged on 11 November. He was promoted to Général de brigade on 24 December 1805. Watier, commander of the depot of dragoons in Versailles as of June 1806, was called upon in July to take command of the 2nd Brigade of the 1st Cavalry Corps. On 23 September he became Equerry to the Emperor and deployed to the 1806 Prussian campaign. He fought at the battles of Schleitz and Crewismuhlen before being given command in December of the 3rd Light Cavalry Brigade of the Cavalry Reserve. Deploying next in 1807 to Poland, he was awarded the Commander's cross of the Légion d'honneur on 14 May 1807 and the Knight's cross of the Order of the Lion of Bavaria on 29 June.

=== Later service ===
Elevated to the rank of Count of the Empire, presumably with the territorial designator "of Saint-Alphonse", Watier assumed command in July 1808 of the 3rd Cavalry Corps of the Army of Spain. During his service in Spain he participated in the battles of Burgos, Saragossa, and Fuentes-de-Oñoro. Reallocated to the 2nd Cuirassier Division of the Army of Germany in June, he once again returned to Spain to take part in the campaigns of 1810-11 in the French armies in the north of Spain and Portugal. He is promoted to major-general, or Général de division, on 31 July 1811.

General Watier was summoned again for service outside Iberia during the Russian campaign of 1812. Leading the 2nd Cuirassiers Division of the 2nd Reserve Cavalry Corps, he was engaged at the pivotal Battle of Borodino. He was then given command of the cavalry of the 13th Corps on 3 September 1813, where he would be present for the Siege of Hamburg.

After the Emperor's abdication and the return of Bourbon rule to France, Watier was placed in non-activity and awarded with the Knight's cross of the Order of Saint-Louis on 19 July 19. When Napoleon returned during the Hundred-Days, Watier became the commander of the 13th Cavalry Division of the 4th Cavalry Corps of the Army of the North. After the last defeat of Napoleon and Second Restoration, Watier was relieved from duty for three years. He would be called back into availability on 30 December 1818, and then be posted as Inspector-General of Cavalry in 1820; his Legion of Honor would be upgraded to Grand-Officier class on 1 May 1821. His later years would be defined by the acquisition of various positions. He was appointed as Inspector of the Gendarmerie in 1823, as Chairman of the Horse Selection Committee in 1825 and as Chairman of the Cavalry Committee on 1 January 1830. Transferred in the Veteran Pool in 1835, he was in non-activity status by 1836 and finally in the reserve pool (retired list) of the General Staff on 15 August 1839.
