= Breunig =

Breunig is a surname. Notable people with the surname include:

- Bob Breunig (born 1953), American football linebacker
- Johann Adam Breunig (1660–1727), German Baroque architect
- Louis Breunig (born 2003), German footballer
- Martin Breunig (born 1992), German basketball player
- Max Breunig (1888–1961), German footballer
- Maximilian Breunig (born 2000), German footballer
