= Angelbachtal =

- Municipality
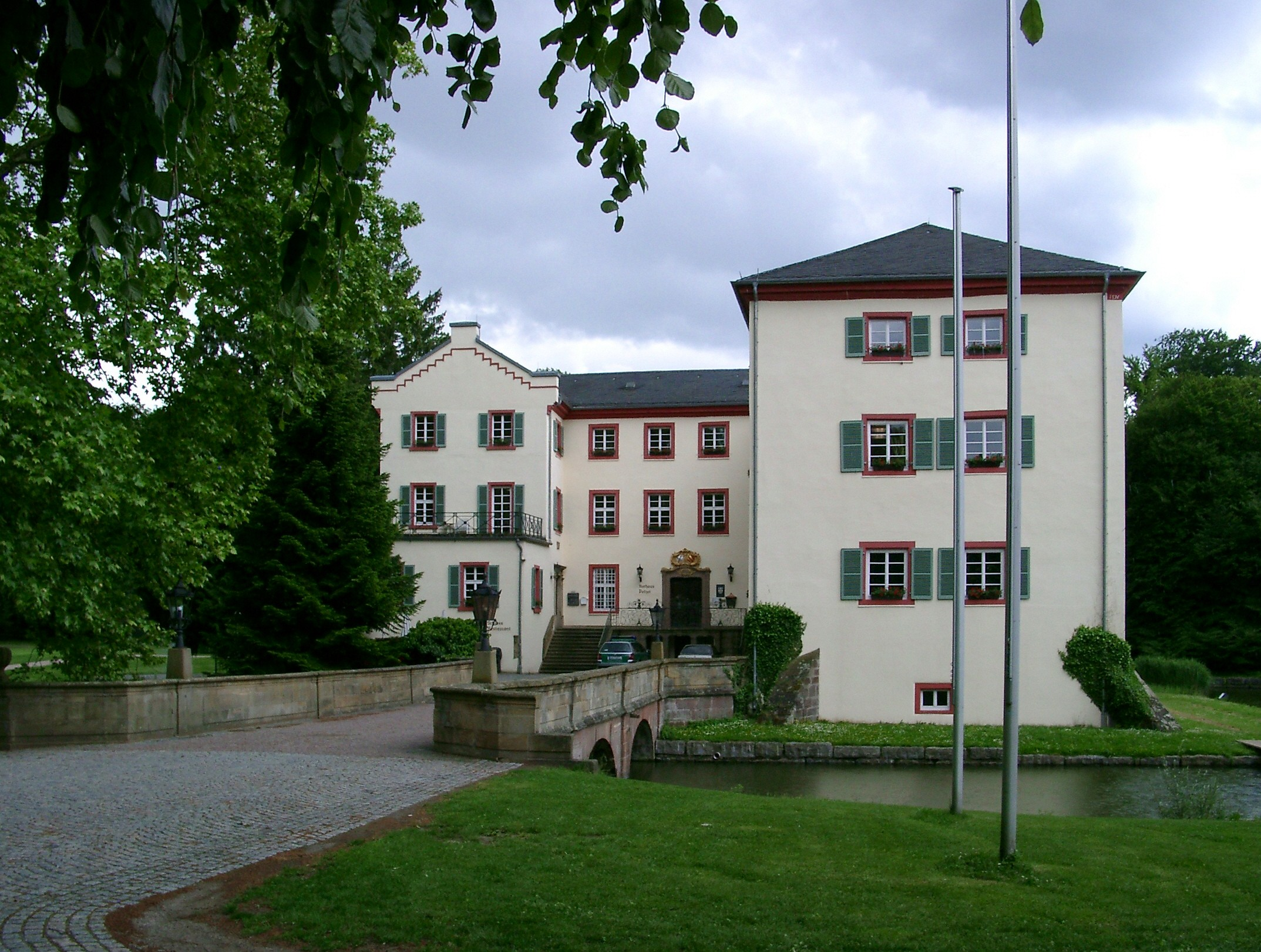
- The town hall is located in the castle at Eichtersheim.

- Coat of arms

- Location of Angelbachtal within Rhein-Neckar-Kreis district
- Interactive map of Angelbachtal
- Location within Germany Location within Baden-Württemberg
- Coordinates: 49°14′N 8°47′E
- Country: Germany
- State: Baden-Württemberg
- Admin. region: Karlsruhe
- District: Rhein-Neckar-Kreis
- Subdivisions: 2 boroughs

Government
  - Mayor (2016–24): Frank Werner (CDU)

Area
  - Total: 17.92 km^{2} (6.92 sq mi)
- Elevation: 159 m (522 ft)

Population (2025-12-31)
  - Total: 5,241
  - Density: 292.5/km^{2} (757.5/sq mi)
- Time zone: UTC+01:00 (CET)
  - Summer (DST): UTC+02:00 (CEST)
- Postal codes: 74916-74918
- Dialling codes: 07265
- Vehicle registration: HD
- Website: www.angelbachtal.de

Angelbachtal is a municipality in Kraichgau, between Sinsheim and Bruchsal, created in 1972 by the union of Eichtersheim and Michelfeld. The name Angelbachtal comes from the valley of the Waldangelbach, which flows through Kraichgau.

== Geography ==
Angelbachtal is near Heidelberg in the hills of the Kraichgau in the district Rhein-Neckar Kreis, Baden-Württemberg. The municipality lies in a valley of the same name. The river valley ends near Rauenberg, where it runs into the Upper Rhine valley. The mild climate benefits agriculture and people.

The highest point is Roßberg at 283 metres (928 ft). The lowest point is the bed of the Angelbach at 159 metres (522 ft).

=== Neighboring communities ===
The following cities and municipalities border Angelbachtal, clockwise from the North:

- Sinsheim-Eschelbach
- Sinsheim-Dühren
- Sinsheim-Waldangelloch
- Östringen (Karlsruhe)
- Mühlhausen (Kraichgau).

With the exception of Östringen, all of these places lie in the Rhein-Neckar Kreis.

=== Boroughs ===
Angelbachtal consists of the boroughs of Eichtersheim and Michelfeld.

== History ==
=== Eichtersheim ===
Eichtersheim was first mentioned in the Lorsch Codex in 838. Around 1200 the village belonged to the knights of Steinach. From 1541 it became one of the holdings belonging to the barons of Venningen, who were part of the knight-canton Kraichgau. In 1806 Baden took control of Eichtersheim.

=== Michelfeld ===
Michelfeld was first mentioned in the Lorsch Codex in 831. From 1508 to 1806 Michelfeld was under the control of the Knights of Gemmingen. In 1806 Michelfeld became part of Baden.

=== Role of Eichtersheim and Michelfeld in the Revolution of 1848 ===
Because of the association of Eichtersheim and Michelfeld with Friedrich Hecker popular committees quickly formed and had great resonance with the population at large. The popular committee in Eichtersheim included 126 members, while in Michelfeld there were 87. As Eichtersheim had at that time only about 150 families (in a population of 750), one can say that the entire village embraced the revolution. By way of the police lists, in which the participants in the revolutionary movement and their "high treason" is documented, one can conclude that the citizens of Eichterheim and Michelfeld participated in the mobilization and support of the "first contingent." It is also remarkable that the revolutionaries spanned the entire range of professions, for example, mayor, court clerk, businessman, farmer, innkeeper, etc. After the revolution failed, both communities suffered greatly from the punishments that followed.

=== Union ===
On 1 April 1972 Eichtersheim and Michelfeld were unified in the municipality Angelbachtal.

== Government ==
=== Municipal council ===
Municipal Council 2019
Party	Votes	Seats
Independent (Freie Wähler)	30,33%	4
CDU	27,10%	4
"Junge Liste" (Youth Party)	20,84%	3
GAL (Green Party)	13,90%	2
SPD	7,83%	1

=== Coat of arms ===
The blazon of the coat of arms (paraphrased) is azure, bar wavy gemel or, crossed Fleur-de-lys staves gules, on azure a crescent moon with face or to dexter.

The coat of arms unites motifs from the coat of arms of the two original villages and at the same time symbolizes the location and name of the community. The red lily staffs are from the coat of arms of Eichtersheim and acknowledge the Barons of Venningen. The halfmoon with the face comes from the Michelfeld coat of arms which is a nod to the Knights of Gemmingen. The waves stand for the Angelbach. The flag is yellow and blue and with the coat of arms was bestowed upon Angelbachtal by the Rhein-Neckar district administration office on 30 April 1985.

== Culture and sights ==
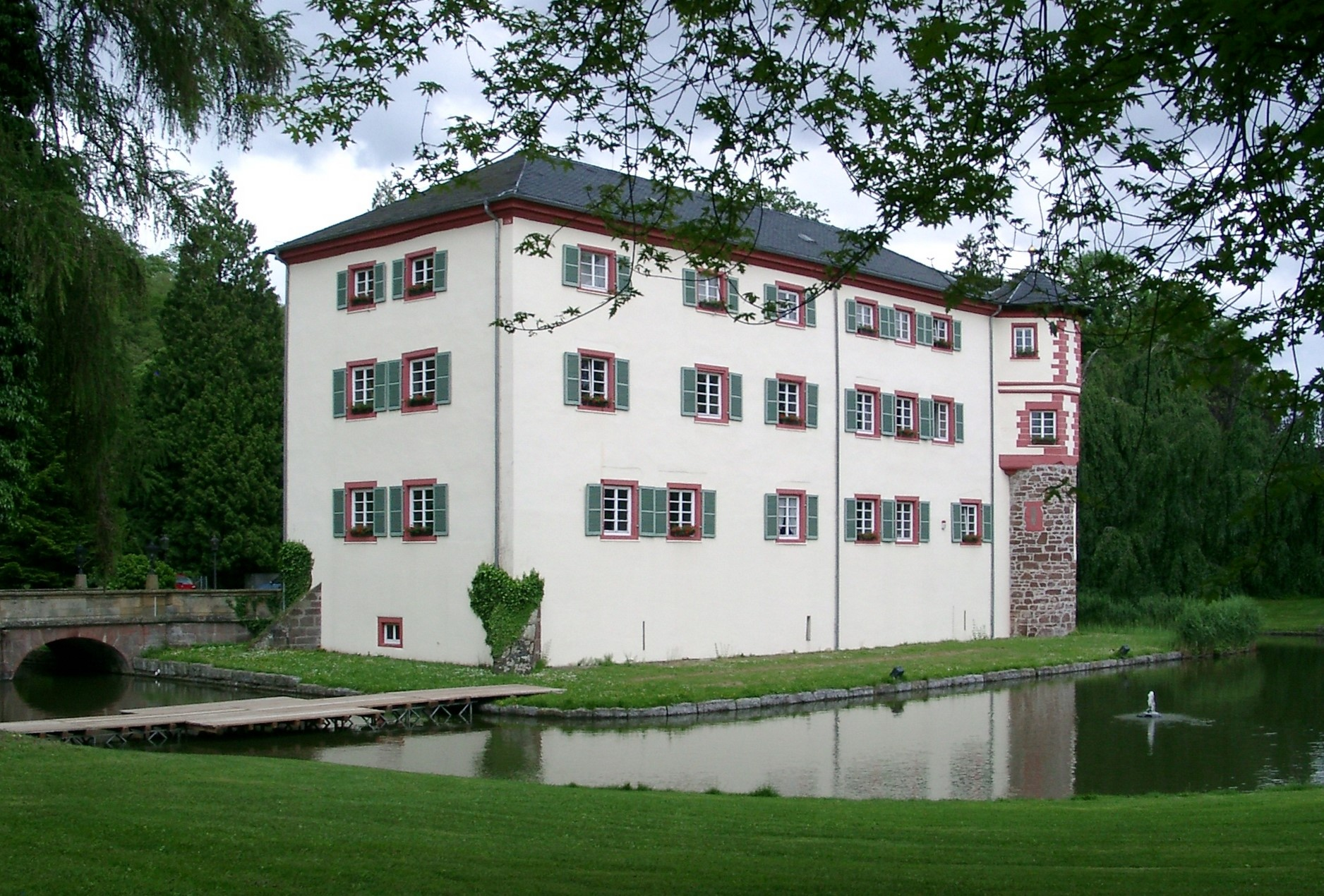
A rear view of Schloss Eichtersheim

=== Buildings ===
- Schloss Eichtersheim (a water castle with park and sculptures by Juergen Goertz)
- Schloss Michelfeld

=== Events ===
- Pentecost market with lighting of the castle park
- Jousting and mediaeval fair
- Pottery and artists market
- Castle park serenade
- Highland games
- Christmas market

== Economy and infrastructure ==
=== Transportation ===
The federal highways (Bundesstraße) B 292 and B 39 go through Angelbachtal. B 39 also serves as detour U 68 for the autobahn A 6. The B 292 runs from Bruchsal through Östringen into Angelbachtal-Eichtersheim toward Sinsheim and onwards in the direction of Mosbach. The B 39 comes from Wiesloch over Mühlhausen through Angelbachtal-Eichtersheim and through Sinsheim in the direction of Heilbronn. Both highways share the section Angelbachtal-Sinsheim. The rural road L 551 goes from Angelbachtal-Michelfeld to Waldangelloch in the direction of Eppingen. The district road K 4177 goes from Angelbachtal-Michelfeld to Sinsheim-Dühren.

=== Education ===
In Angelbachtal there is the Sonnenbergschule, a combined primary and secondary school with integrated trade school. For further education, there are schools in Sinsheim, Wiesloch, and Östringen.

== Notable people ==
- Friedrich Hecker, (1811–1881), freedom fighter in the March revolution of 1848–49.
- Lazarus Dinkelspiel (1824–1900), an American businessman
