= Schloss Michelfeld =

Coordinates: 49.2279°N 8.7812°E

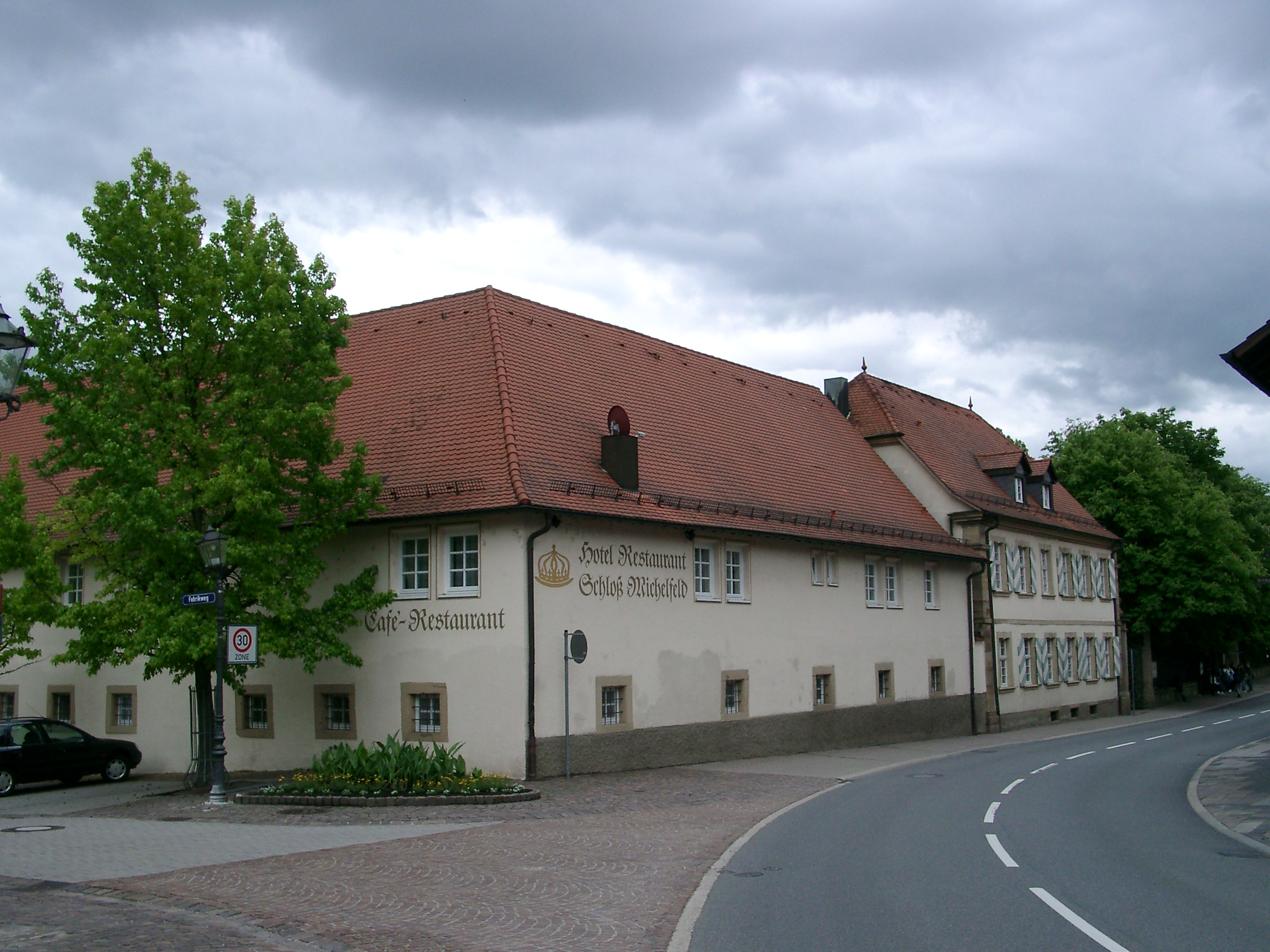
The entrance of the estate prior to the fire in 2008

Schloss Michelfeld is a manor house situated in Michelfeld, Baden-Württemberg, Germany.

== Origins ==
The manor has, throughout the years, served as a private home to various nobles, including the Counts of Katzellenbogen and the Lords of Gemmingen. The manor's first documented mention is in the year 1390. The manor as it is today was built in 1753 by the Lords of Gemmingen-Hornberg, probably on the ruin of a castle that was destroyed during the Thirty Years' War.

== Schloss Rheydt today ==
The manor is still privately owned. The rest of the estate buildings have been converted into a Restaurant and hotel. Since then the manor has undergone both interior and exterior restoration twice in recent years due to the manor partially burning down twice.
