= Schloss Eichtersheim =

Manor house in Eichtersheim, Germany

Coordinates: 49°14′01″N 8°46′31″E

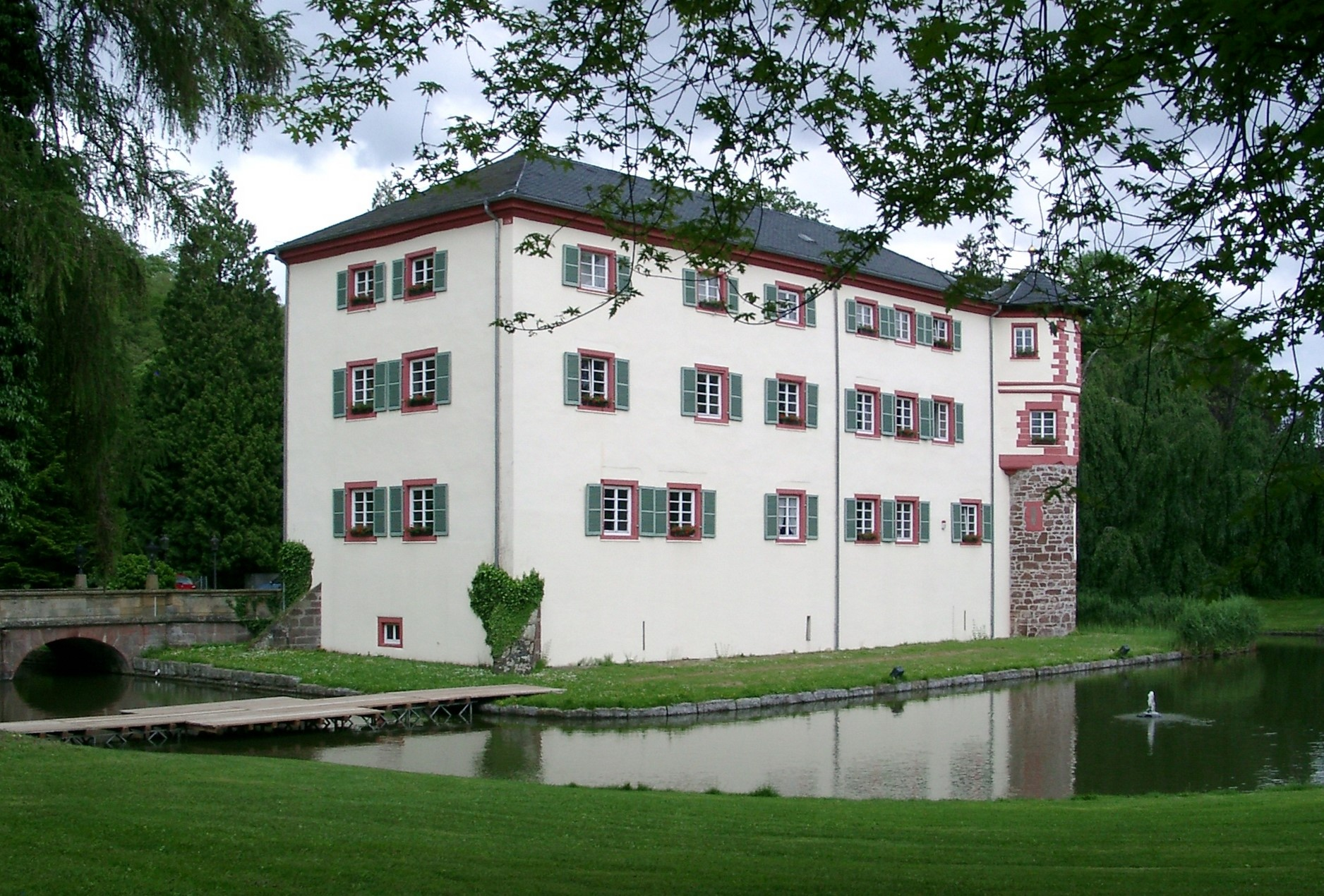

Schloss Eichtersheim, formerly also Schloß Eichtersheim is a manor house situated in Eichtersheim, Baden-Württemberg, Germany.

== Origins ==
The manor was first built in the sixteenth century when it served as a private home. It is entirely surrounded by a moat. A sandstone bridge leads to the main entrance. The manor is surrounded by simplistic gardens that are almost wood-like.

== Schloss Rheydt Today ==
The manor was purchased by the town of Angelbachtal from the last private owner of the manor in the 1980s. Since then the manor has undergone both interior and exterior restoration. Since the purchase by the town of Angelbachtal vast parts of Schloss Rheydt have been converted into office space as the manor now accommodates the townhall.

=== Events ===
Due to the size of the manor gardens various local events now take place in or outside the manor, such as:

- Whitsun market with lighting of the castle park
- Jousting and mediaeval fair
- Pottery and artists market
- Castle park serenade
- Highland games
- Christmas market
