= Old University, Heidelberg =

Building of the University of Heidelberg

Coordinates: 49°24′40″N 8°42′22″E

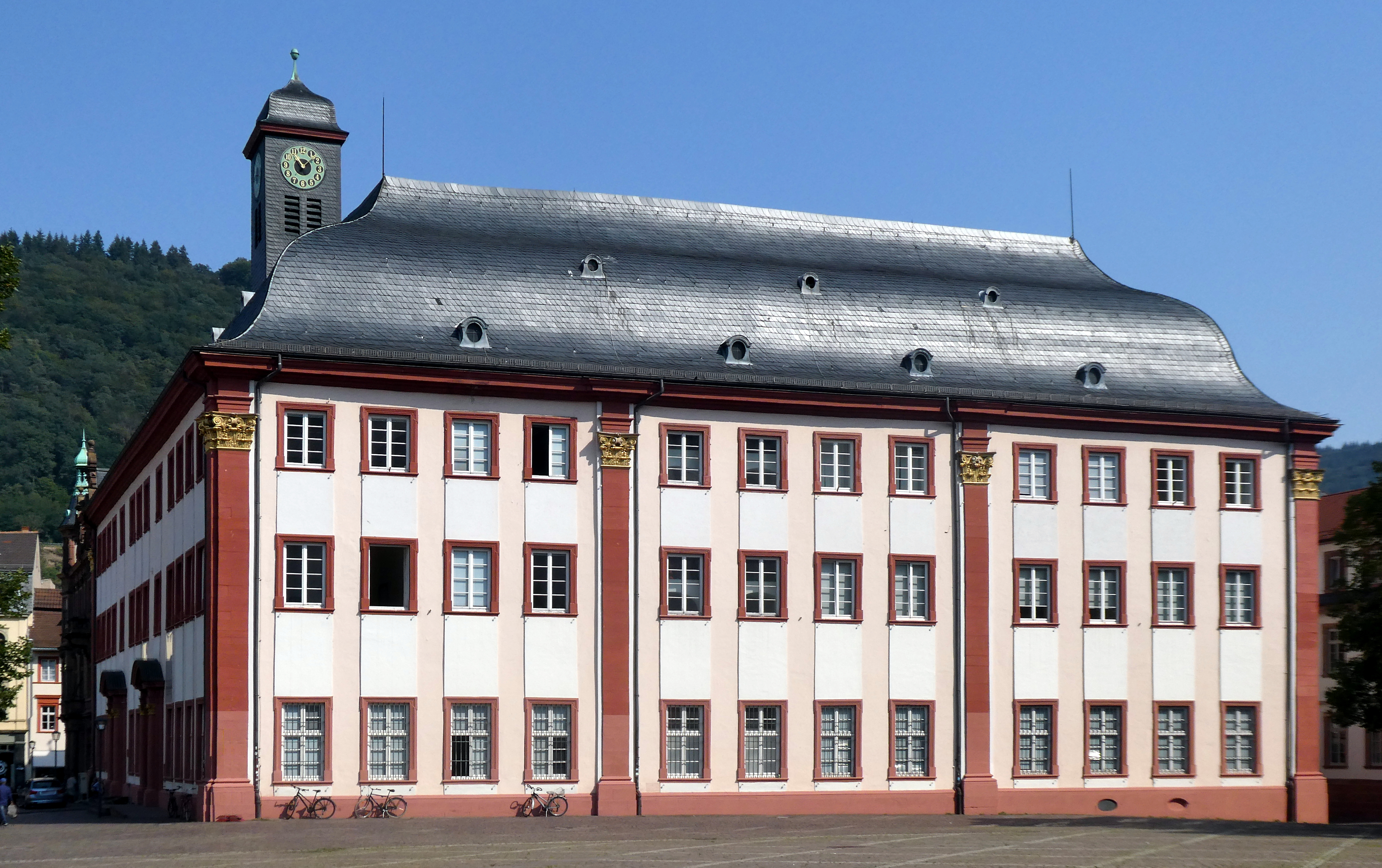
Old University of Heidelberg, 2020

The Old University (German: Alte Universität) is an important baroque building of the University of Heidelberg located between the Hauptstrasse and the Universitätsplatz in the old town of Heidelberg. It contains the Hall of the University, once the main assembly hall and lecture theatre of the University, as well as the Heidelberg University Museum and the old University gaol.

== History ==
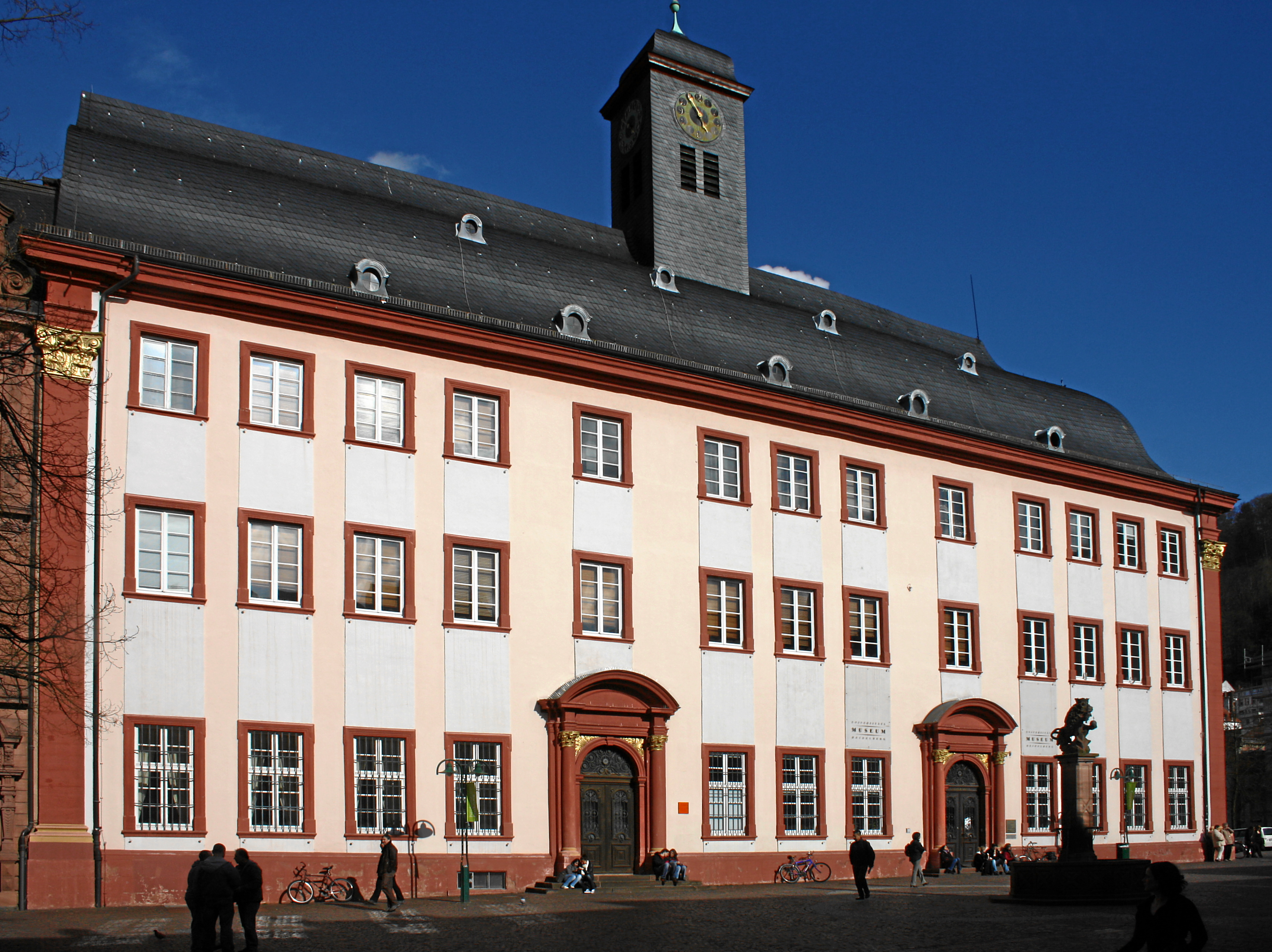
The Old University, west wing.

The Old University was built over a period of 23 years between 1712 and 1735, based on plans by the baroque architect Johann Adam Breunig. The structure replaced a four-story college building belonging to the university called the "Casimirianum," which had been erected in 1591 by the Count John Casimir. The construction work was part of the rebuilding effort following the destruction of the city of Heidelberg in the War of the Palatine Succession (1688-1697). The building was at first named Domus Whilhelmiana, after the donor, Elector Johann Wilhelm. In 1886, on the occasion of the 500 year anniversary of the founding of the University of Heidelberg, the Alte Aula ("Old assembly hall") in the west wing was remodelled in the Renaissance Revival style. The current name, "Old University" came into use in the early 1930s following the erection of the lecture hall building known as New University on the opposite side of Universitätsplatz.

== Hall of the Old University ==
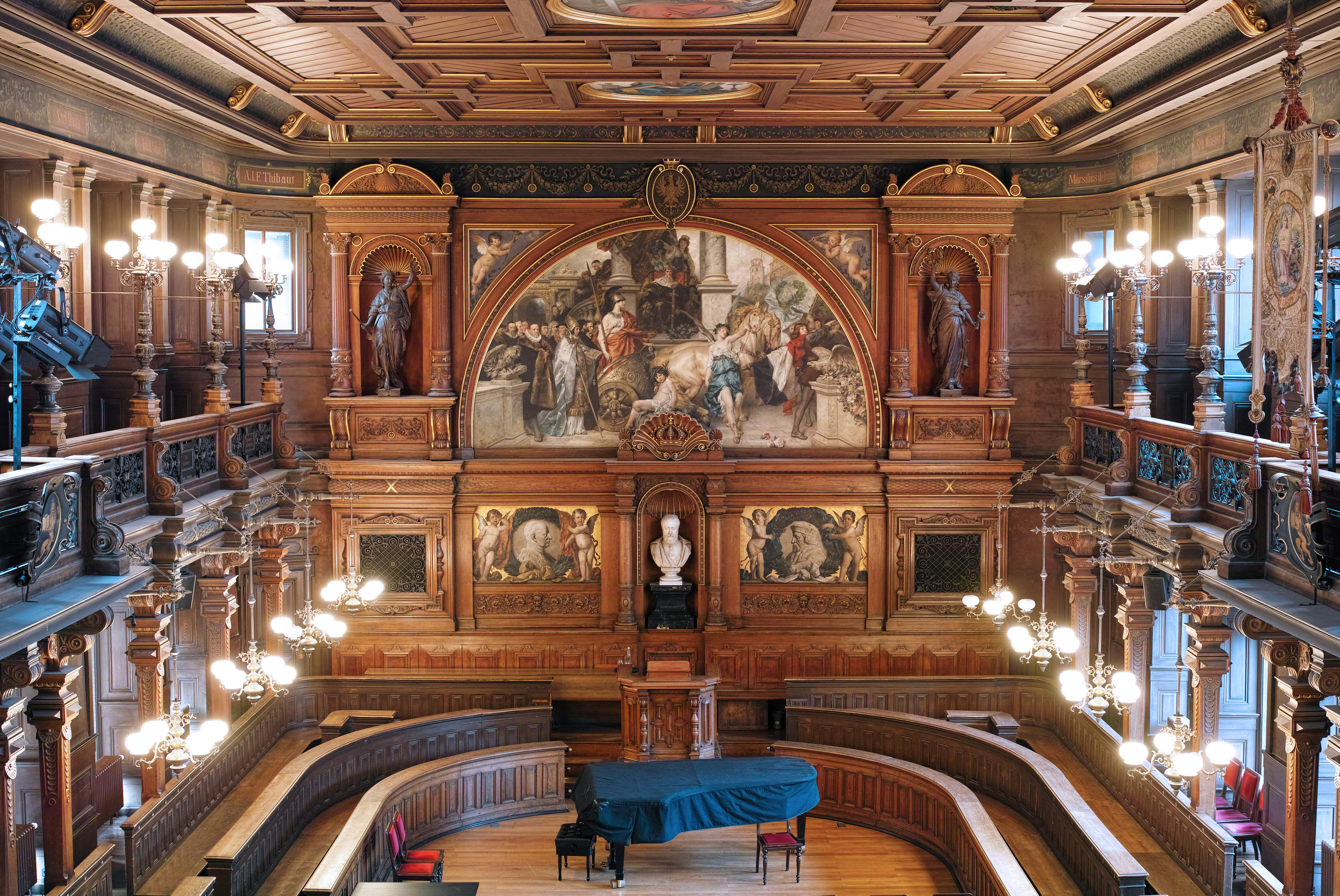
Lectern of the inner room of the hall of Old University.

The Hall of the Old University, Heidelberg German: Aula der Alten Universität is the central hall of the Old University. It was originally built as an assembly hall and lecture theatre, in the baroque style and decorated with a stucco ceiling. Hierarchically arranged seating for individuals and groups was traditional in university halls and so the front part of the hall, with its characteristic rounded rows of seating and a podium in the centre was reserved for the representatives of the four faculties of the university and the inner Senate.

On the five hundredth jubilee of the University in 1886, the hall was redecorated in the Renaissance Revival style, following a plan by Josef Durm. A gallery in the entrance area and along both sides of the room was installed, which divides the space into two levels.

=== Rear wall ===
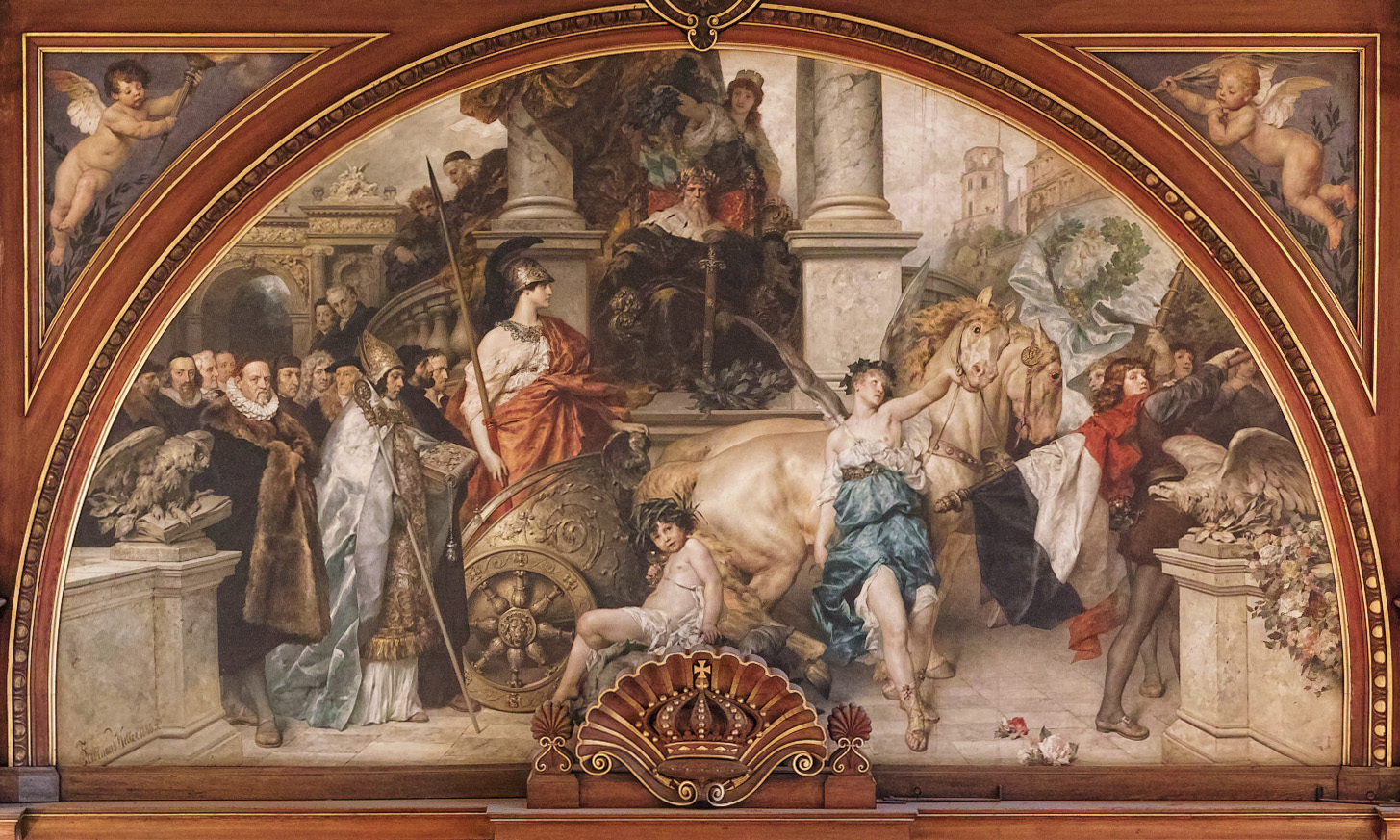
The painting Founding of the University of Heidelberg by Ferdinand Keller.

The rear wall of the hall, behind the speaker's platform, is built on a strictly symmetrical plan in the form of a triumphal arch. It is the focal point of the hall's design. In the centre of the arch is the painting Founding of the University of Heidelberg by the painter Ferdinand Keller (1842-1922). The painting depicts the foundation and history of the University allegorically. Pallas Athena, the ancient Greek goddess of wisdom and the arts is shown driving a chariot through Heidelberg, led by the victory goddess Nike. Behind her, selected individuals from the history of Heidelberg University and intellectual history between the 14th century and the 19th century are depicted. Part of Heidelberg Castle is visible at the top right. In the centre, a personifications of the Neckar River sits on a throne, with a personification of the city of Heidelberg standing behind him. To the left and right of the painting are two bronze statues of women, personifying fame and wisdom. Fame holds a trombone, while Wisdom wears a wreath and holds up a torch. They are the work of Adolf Heer (1849-1898). In the lower part of the wall, there are three portraits of rulers: in the centre, a bust of Grand Duke Frederick I, who was rector of the University in 1886, by the sculptor Karl Freiderich Moest; at right, Elector Rupert I, the founder of the University; and, at left, Grand Duke Charles Frederick, who refounded the University at the beginning of the 19th century.

=== Ceiling ===
The decoration of the wooden ceiling consists of four round paintings by the painter Rudolf Gleichauf (1826-1896), which depict the faculties of the University at the time in an allegorical fashion, as seated female figures with characteristic attributes: a scroll and a globe for philosophy, a snake and a cup for medicine, a sword of justice, book of law, and a diploma for jurisprudence, and a Bible and tablet with the Ten Commandments for Theology.

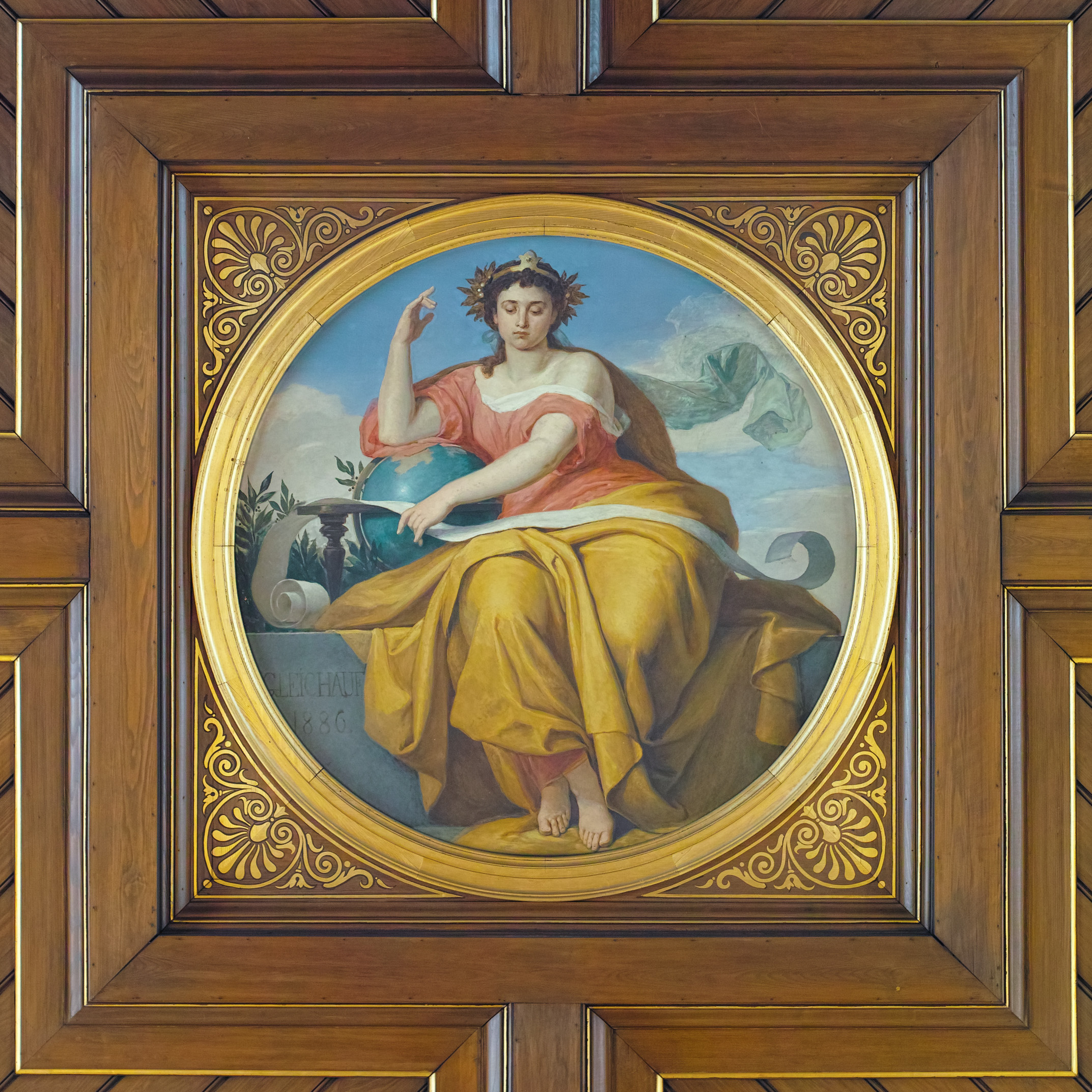
Philosophy

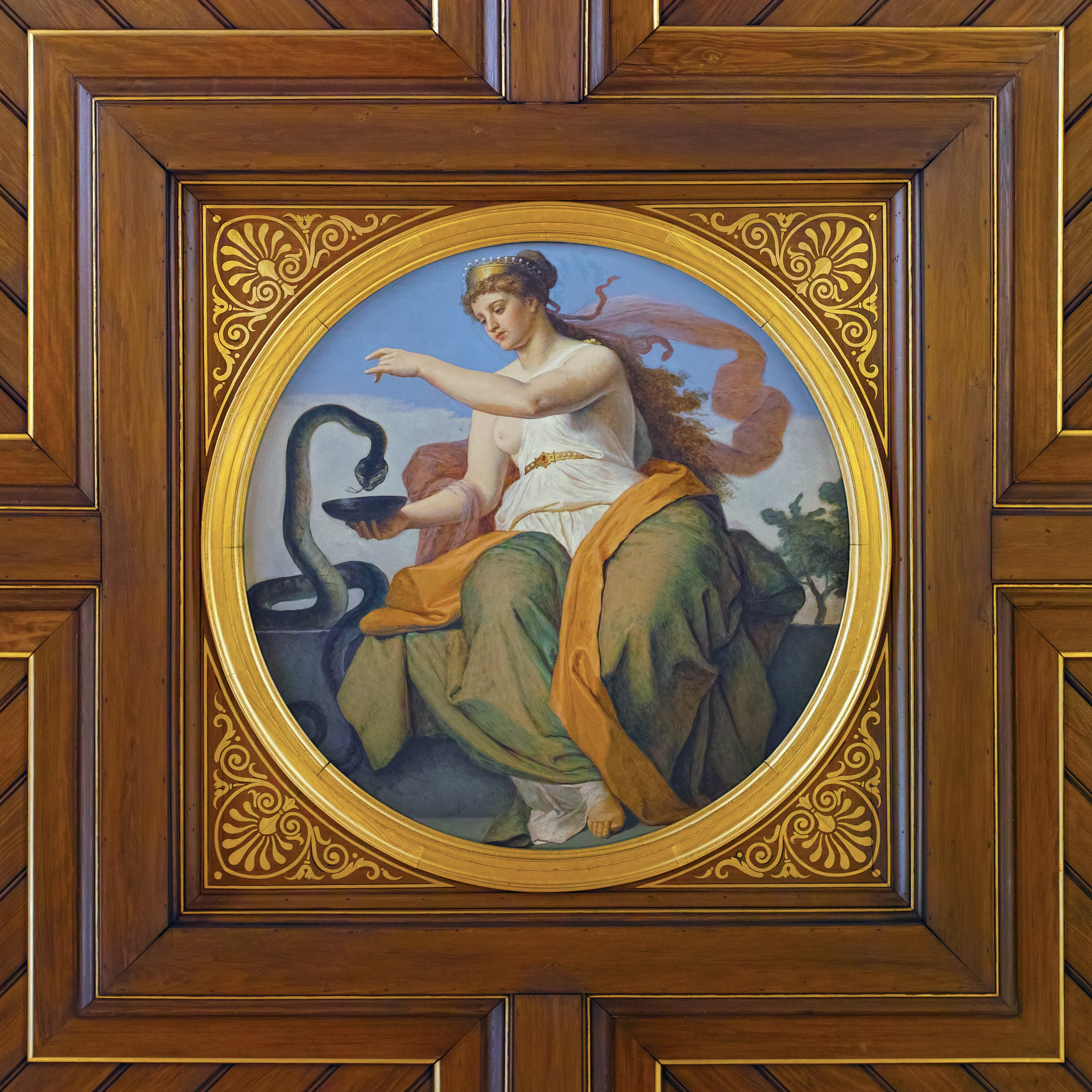
Medicine

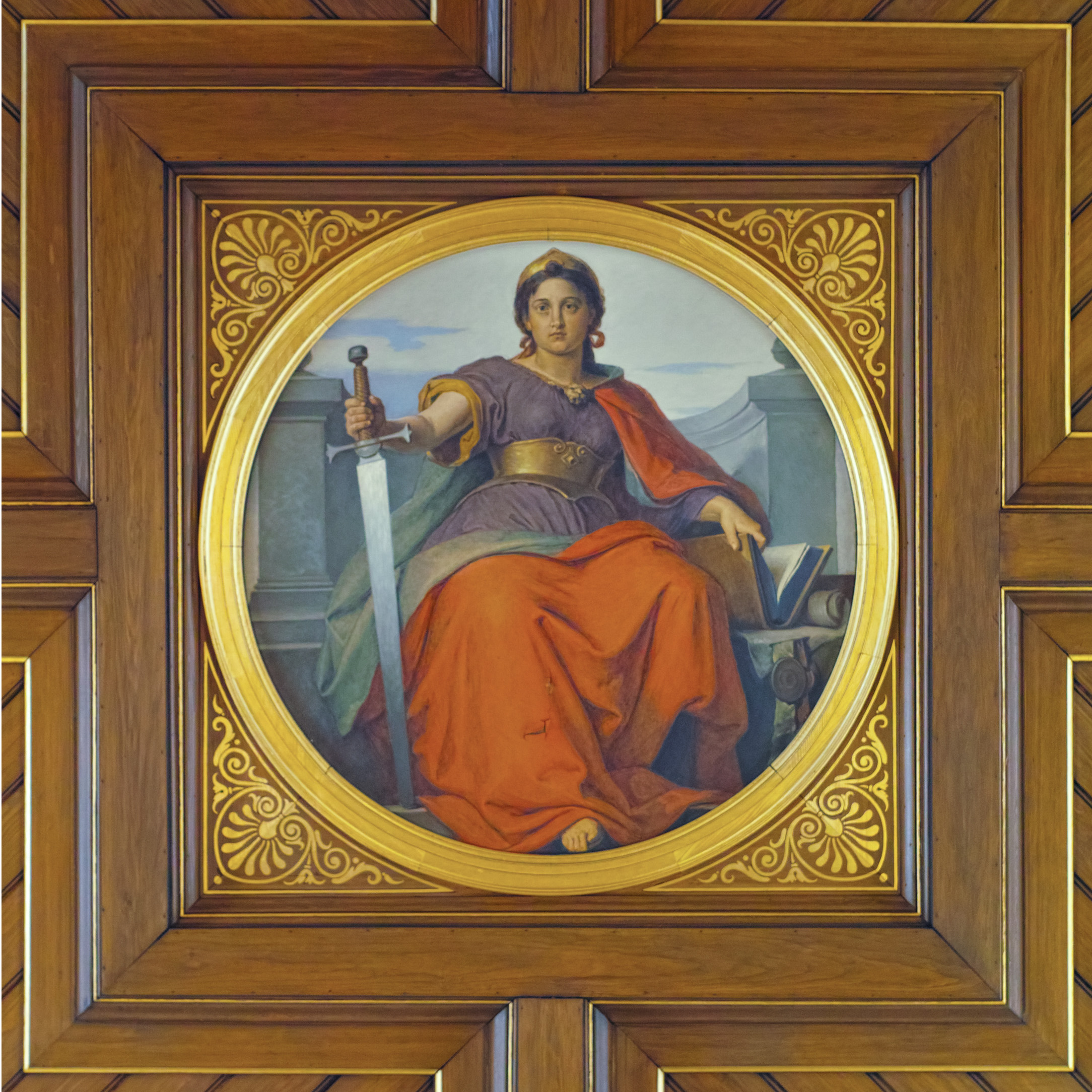
Jurisprudence

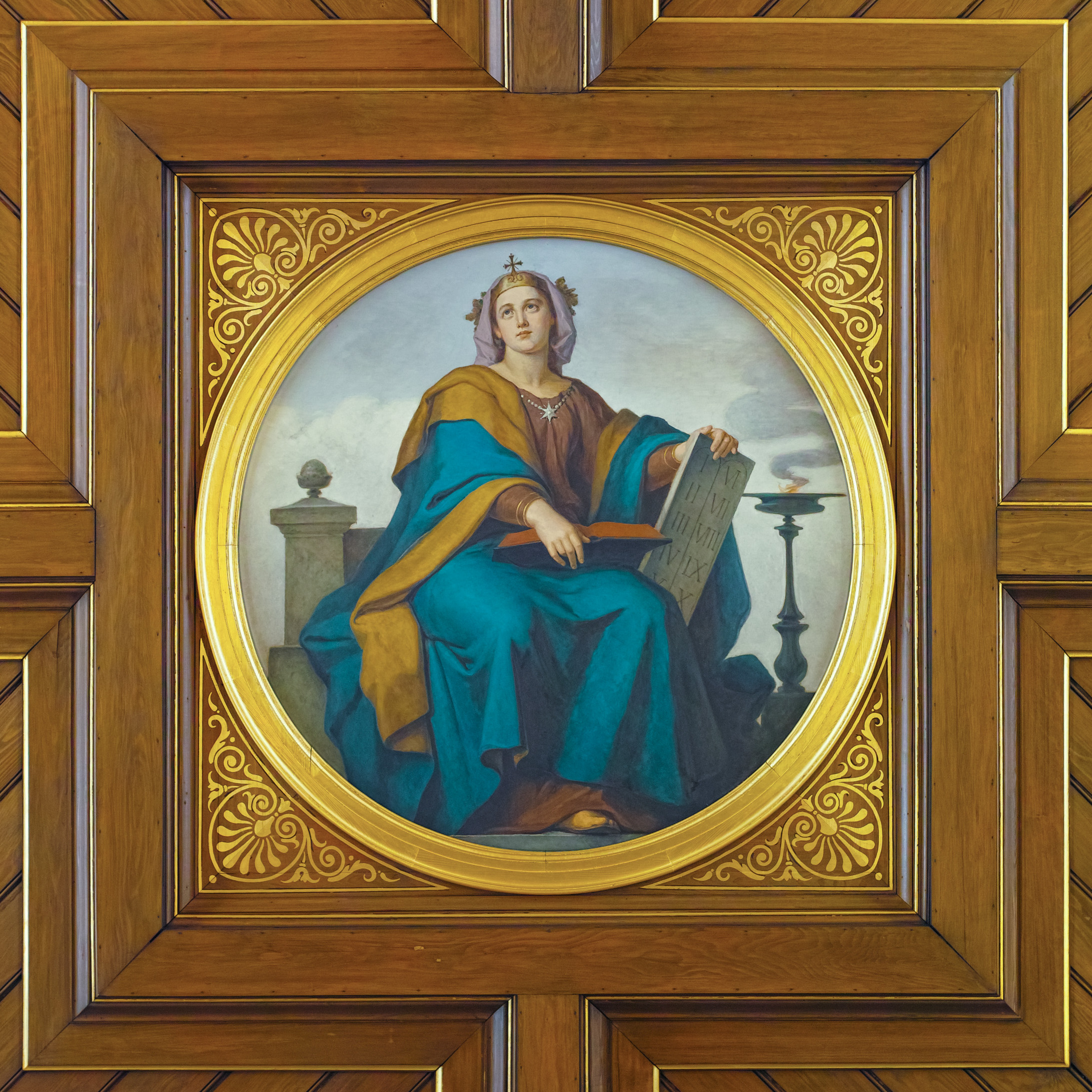
Theology

=== Side walls ===
Along both side walls and the entrance wall of the hall are listed thirty-seven names of famous Heidelberg scholars, divided into two rows - one on the upper frieze and one on plaques in the railings of the gallery. They range from Marsilius of Inghen, the founding rector of the University in 1386, to 19th century professors like the chemist Robert Bunsen and the physicist and physician Hermann von Helmholtz. On the right balcony is the jubilee banner, which was made for the 500th anniversary of the University's founding. In the centre of the banner is an allegorical personification of wisdom. On the back is a text saying "Donated by women and daughters of the academic teachers, 1886."

=== Entrance area ===
An inscription in the upper frieze of the entrance-wall of the hall commemorates the Grand Duke of Baden. A congratulatory tablet from the University of Freiburg from 1886 hangs above the doorway.

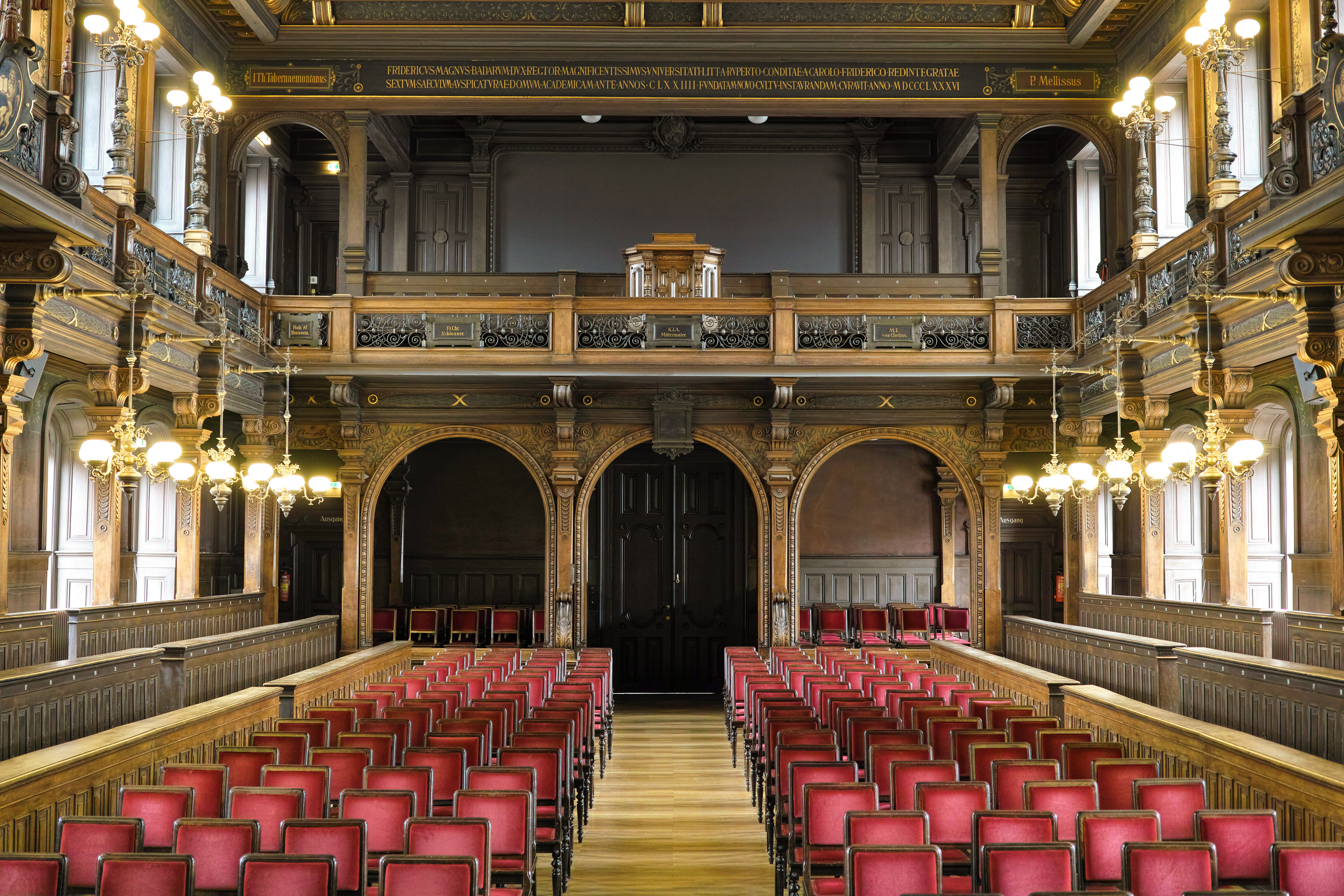
Entrance area

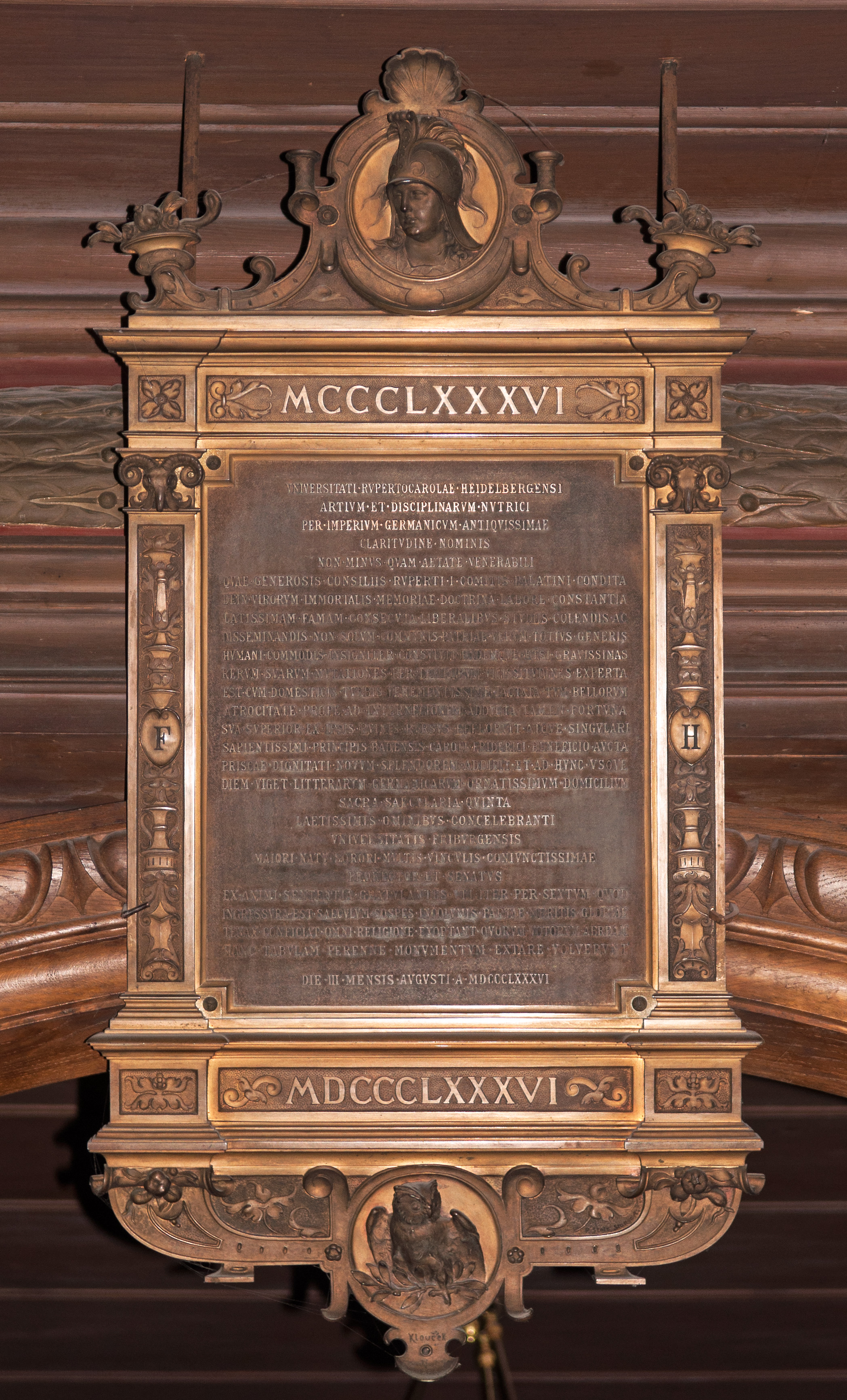
Congratulatory plaque from the University of Freiburg

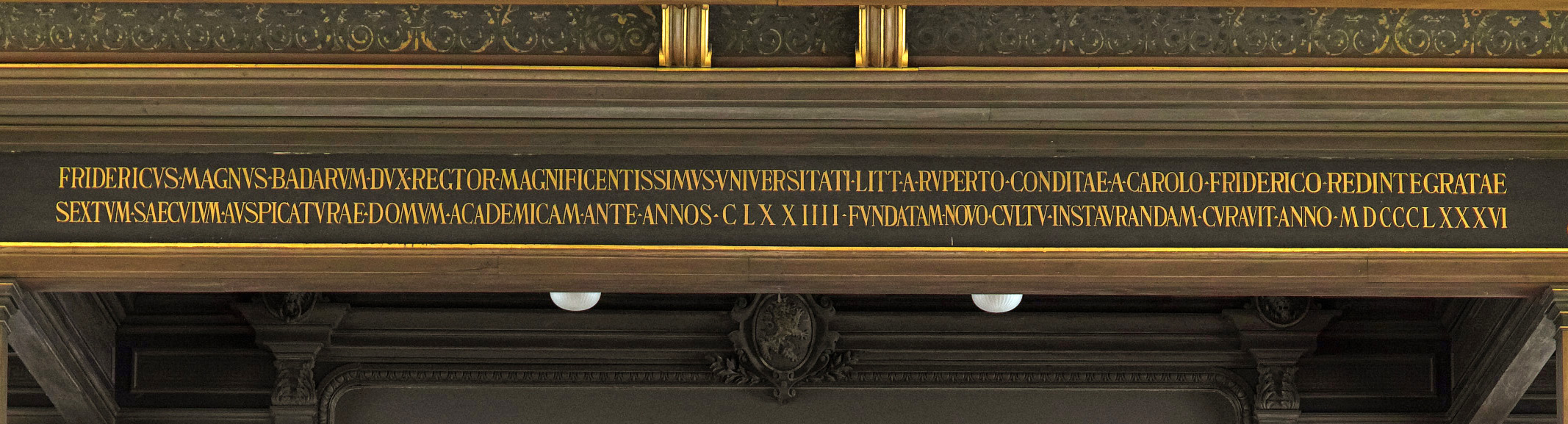
Inscription in the upper frieze of the entrance area

== Current use ==
The Hall of the Old University, Heidelberg is used today mainly for academic celebrations like the traditional annual festival of the University and the beginning of each winter semester. It is also used as a venue for concerts, readings, presentations, and celebrations, especially awards of cultural prizes. The Old University also hosts the rectorate of the university and the University Museum, which was established in 1996. The museum documents the history of the university.

The Old University incorporates the student gaol (Student karzer, Heidelberg) in a baroque building with its entrance on the Augustinergasse. Students were incarcerated in this structure as punishment until the early twentieth century.

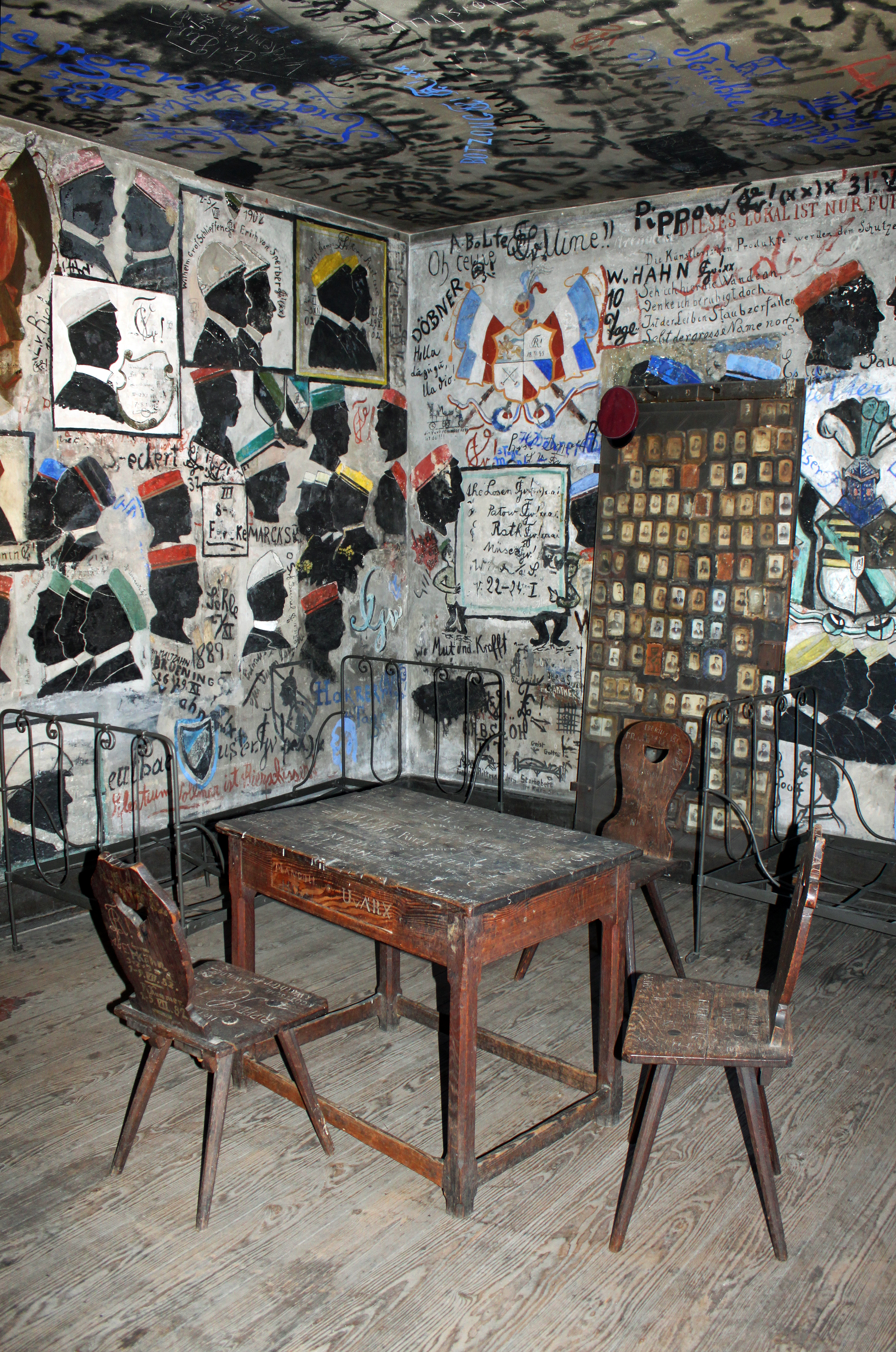
Student gaol

The lion fountain in front of the west facade of the Old University was one of the most important water sources for the citizens of Heidelberg for several centuries.

== Bibliography ==
- Heike Hawicks, Ingo Runde (ed.), Die Alte Aula der Universität Heidelberg. Heidelberg University Publishing, Heidelberg 2016. doi:10.17885/heiup.122.149
- Sabine Juschka, "Die Alte Universität. Grabengasse 1." in Peter Anselm Riedl (ed.): Semper Apertus. Band V: Die Gebäude der Universität Heidelberg. Textband. Springer, Berlin/Heidelberg u. a. 1987, pp. 48–78.
- Rudolf Schuler, Richard Henk: Heidelberg. ISBN 3-921524-46-6.
- Die Alte Aula der Universität Heidelberg. Im Auftrag des Rektors hrsg. von Heike Hawicks und Ingo Runde. Heidelberg 2016. doi:10.17885/heiup.122.149
- Sabine Bock: Die künstlerische Gestaltung der Heidelberger Universitätsjubiläen. Heidelberg 1993
- Dagmar Drüll: Heidelberger Gelehrtenlexikon 1386–1651. Berlin/Heidelberg 2002
- Dagmar Drüll: Heidelberger Gelehrtenlexikon 1652–1802. Berlin/Heidelberg 1991
- Dagmar Drüll: Heidelberger Gelehrtenlexikon 1803–1932. Berlin/Heidelberg 1986, 2. Aufl. 2018
- Sabine Juschka: Die Alte Universität. In: Peter Anselm Riedl (Hrsg.): Semper Apertus. Sechshundert Jahre Ruprecht-Karls-Universität Heidelberg 1386–1986. Band V: Die Gebäude der Universität Heidelberg. Berlin/Heidelberg 1985, S. 48–72.
