= Mühlhausen, Kraichgau =

Mühlhausen
- Municipality
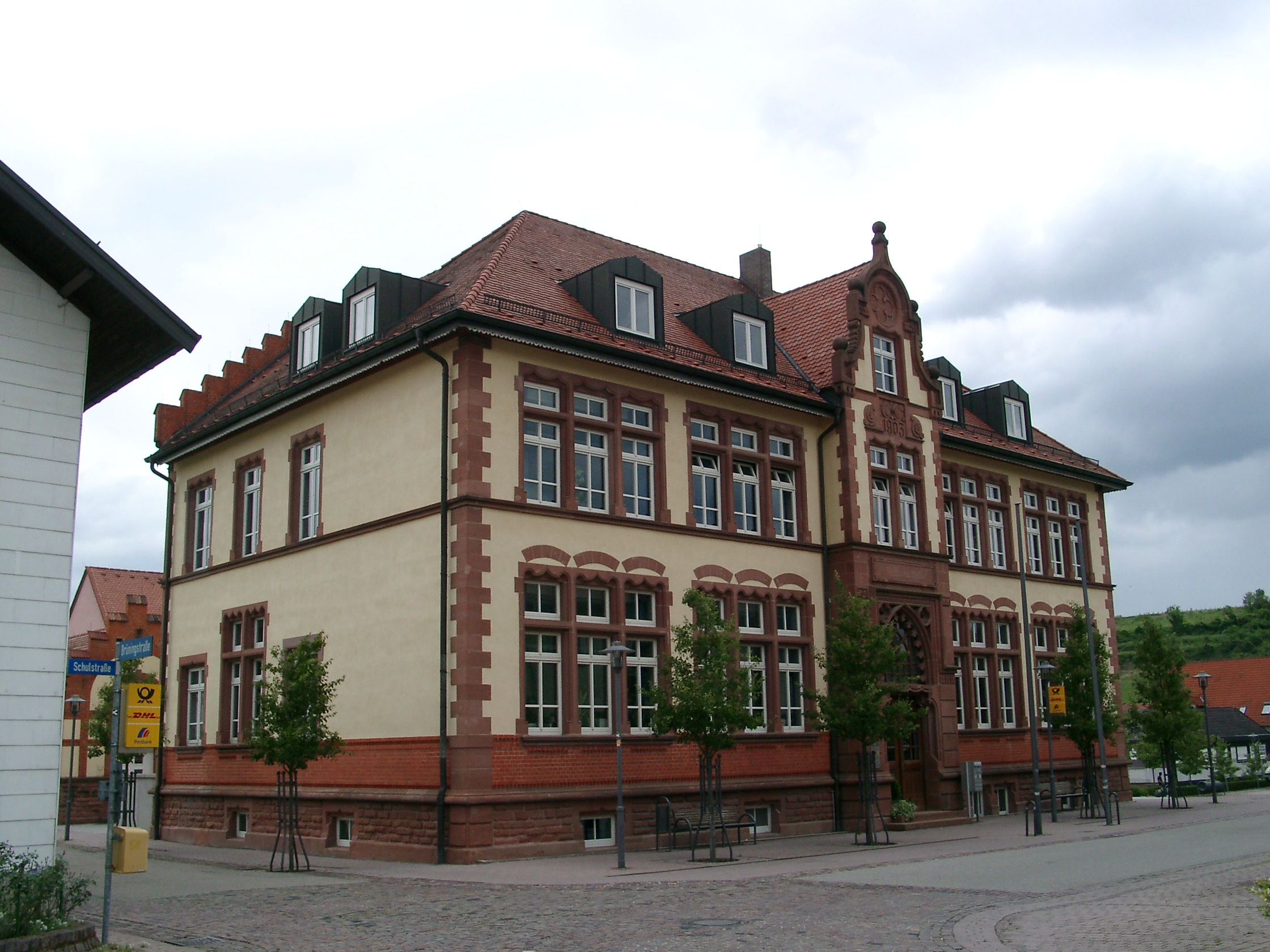
- Town hall

- Coat of arms

- Location of Mühlhausen within Rhein-Neckar-Kreis district
- Interactive map of Mühlhausen
- Location within Germany Location within Baden-Württemberg
- Coordinates: 49°14′51″N 08°43′26″E
- Country: Germany
- State: Baden-Württemberg
- Admin. region: Karlsruhe
- District: Rhein-Neckar-Kreis
- Subdivisions: 3 Ortsteile

Government
  - Mayor (2019–27): Jens Spanberger (CDU)

Area
  - Total: 15.3 km^{2} (5.9 sq mi)
- Elevation: 144 m (472 ft)

Population (2025-12-31)
  - Total: 8,727
  - Density: 570/km^{2} (1,480/sq mi)
- Time zone: UTC+01:00 (CET)
  - Summer (DST): UTC+02:00 (CEST)
- Postal codes: 69240–69242
- Dialling codes: 06222, 07253
- Vehicle registration: HD
- Website: www.muehlhausen-kraichgau.de

Mühlhausen (German pronunciation: [myːlˈhaʊzn̩]) is a town in the district of Rhein-Neckar in Baden-Württemberg in Germany. Mühlhausen has three districts.

== Demographics ==
Population development:

Year	Inhabitants
1990	6,711
2001	7,900
2011	8,163
2021	8,733
