= Order of the Lion of Bavaria =

Order of the Lion of Bavaria Orden vom Pfälzer Löwen
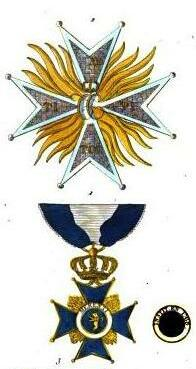
- Star and sash of the order
- Country: (Kingdom of Bavaria) Bavaria
- Presented by: the Elector of Bavaria the King of Bavaria
- Motto: MERENTI
- Status: Obsolete
- Established: 1 January 1768
- Ribbon of the order

The Order of the Lion of Bavaria was created in 1768 by Charles IV Theodore, Elector Palatine, to celebrate the 25th year of his reign. Originally called the Order of the Palatine Lion (Orden vom Pfälzer Löwen), the Order was renamed when the Palatinate-Sulzbach branch of the House of Wittelsbach inherited the Electorate of Bavaria in 1778. The number of knights of the order were limited to 25, including the chancellor, or head of the order. Recipients of the order were originally required to have served the elector house for 25 years in the army or administration, and had to pay 25 ducats for entrance fee. In 1808, Maximilian I Joseph of Bavaria declared the order extinct and made no subsequent awards. Instead, the Order of Merit of the Bavarian Crown was established, two years after the establishment of the Military Order of Max Joseph. The insignia of the Military Merit Order, established 1866, resembled to the ones of the Order of the Lion.

== See also ==
- Palatine Lion
