= Heinrich Charrasky =

Hungarian sculptor

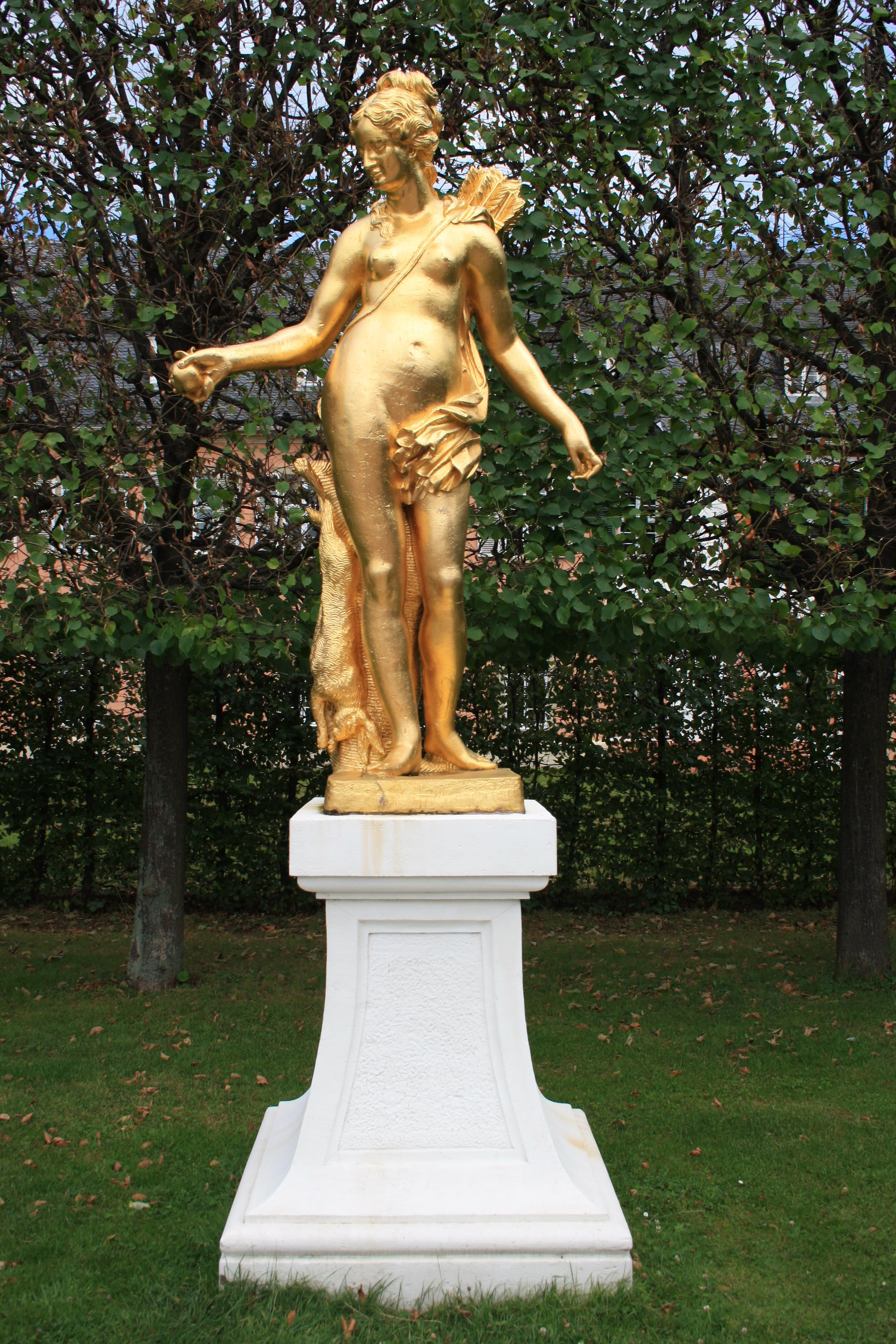
Gilded Diana statue by Heinrich Charrasky, gardens of the Schwetzingen Palace

Heinrich Charrasky or Heinrich Charasky (born 1656 Komárom, Hungary; died 1710) was a Hungarian sculptor in the 18th century. In the year 1710 Charasky was called to Heidelberg for the creation of the electorate's coat of arms at the town hall. He also created the gilded statue of Diana in the garden of the Schwetzingen Palace.
