= Johann Adam Breunig =

German Baroque architect

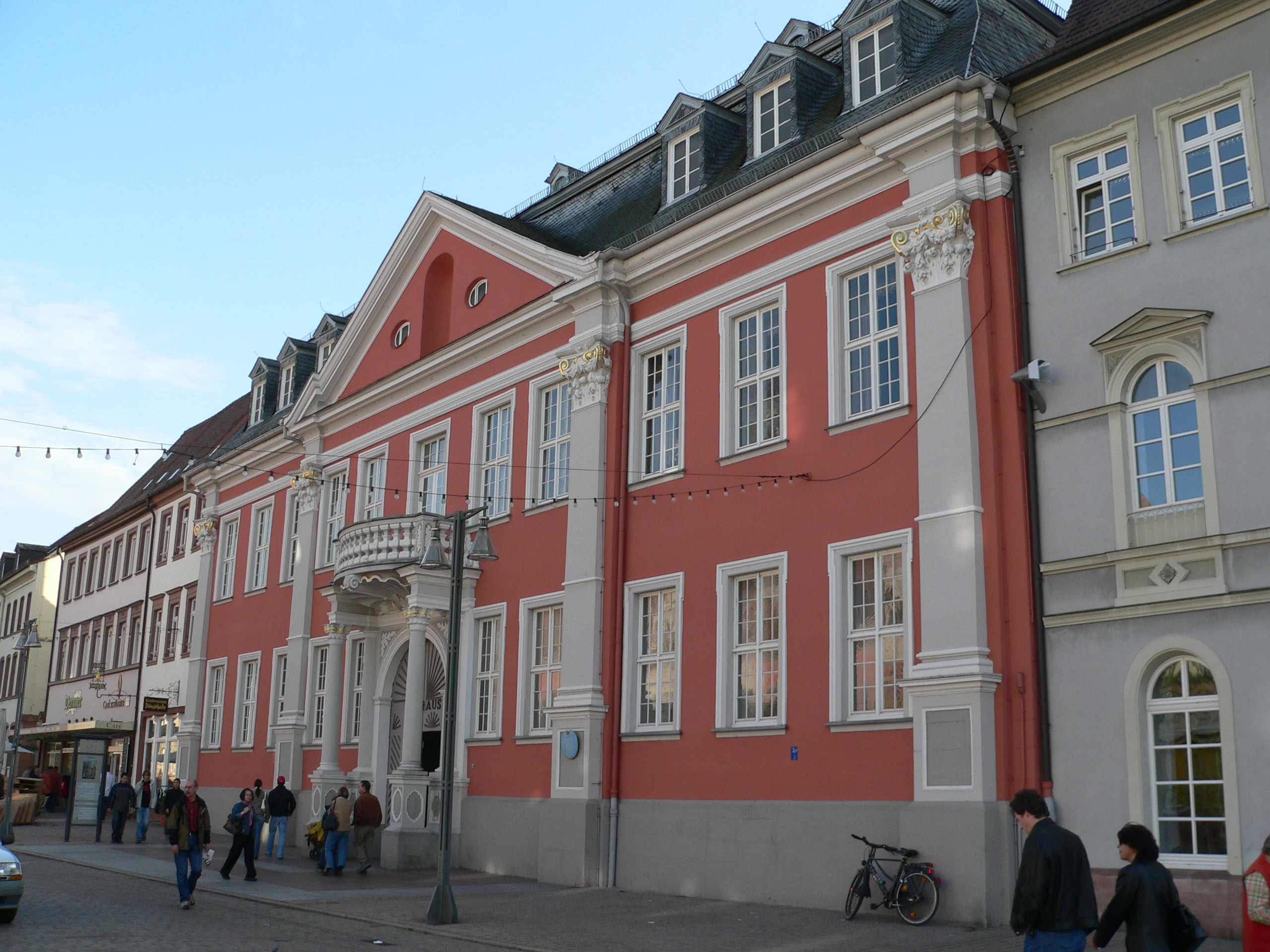
Old Town Hall in Speyer

Johann Adam Breunig (1660 in Mainz – 25 November 1727) was a German Baroque architect. After the Nine Years' War, the Elector Johann Wilhelm initiated the reconstruction of Heidelberg giving Breuning and other architects a broad field of activity.

In 18th century Heidelberg, he built the Old Aula of the university, the Jesuit church, the Jesuit high school and some mansions for affluent citizens.
