= Johann Friedrich Steinkopf =

Johann Friedrich Steinkopf may refer to:

- Johann Friedrich Steinkopf (painter) (1737–1825), German landscape, animal and porcelain painter
- Johann Friedrich Steinkopf (publisher) (1771–1852), German bookseller and publisher
