= Gottlob Friedrich Steinkopf =

German Classical landscape painter

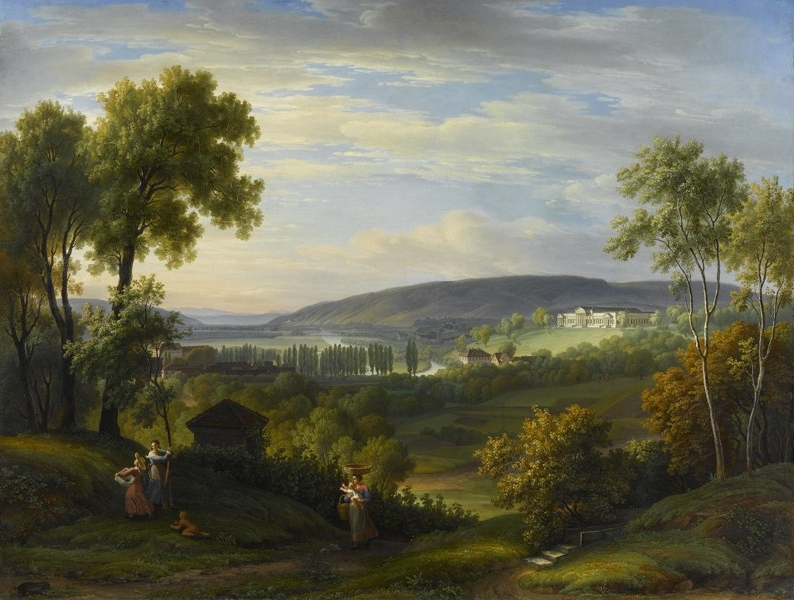
View of Rosenstein Castle and the Neckar valley

Gottlob Friedrich Steinkopf (1 March 1779, Stuttgart - 20 May 1861, Stuttgart) was a German landscape painter in the Classical style.

== Biography ==
He was the fifth of fourteen children born to the animal and porcelain painter, Johann Friedrich Steinkopf, and his wife, Katharina Barbara Betulius (1754–1816), daughter of the publisher, Johann Christoph Betulius (1728-1791). After his father-in-law's death, his older brother, Johann Friedrich, took over the publishing business.

His first art lessons came from his father. After that, he began training as a copper engraver with Johann Friedrich Leybold. In 1798, Leybold moved to Vienna, and he accompanied him, continuing his studies at the Academy of Fine Arts, where he decided to become a landscape painter. In 1807, he was awarded second-prize in a contest held by the Morgenblatt für gebildete Stände, a cultural and literary journal. The prize money made it possible for him to study in Italy. He went together with his wife and her brother, the landscape painter, Karl Jakob Theodor Leybold (son of his former teacher), and lived there until 1814. During that time, he sent home numerous works that received positive reviews in the Morgenblatt. In 1814, he returned to Vienna.

In 1821, at the age of forty-two, he went back to Stuttgart, where he would remain for the rest of his life. Three years later, King William I of Württemberg granted him a pension. In 1829, when the King created a Royal Art School (now part of the State Academy of Fine Arts Stuttgart, Steinkopf became a teacher there. He was promoted to Professor in 1833, and became a member of the governing board in 1845. His students there included Louis Mayer, Theodor Schüz and Carl Ebert. In 1853, he was awarded the Order of the Crown. He retired in 1854, due to poor health.

== Selected list of oil paintings by Steinkopf ==
- 1811: Morgen eines Opferfestes (The morning of a sacrificial feast).
- 1812: Rückkehr von der Löwenjagd (Return of the lion hunt).
- 1813: Abendsegen in der Capelle am Wege (Evening blessings in the chapel along the way).
- 1820: Landschaft mit dem Eichbaum (Landscape with the oak tree).
- 1821: Ulysses und Nausikaa (Ulysses and Nausicaa).
- 1822: Italienische Weinlese (Italian vintage) – Considered to be one of the finest works.
- 1822: Achilles und Chiron (Achilles and Chiron).
- 1822: Abraham mit den drei Engeln (Abraham with the three angels).
- 1823: Rückkehr von der Abendandacht (Return of the evening service).
- 1824: Sonntagsabend im Gebirge (Sunday night in the mountains).
- 1827: Capelle auf dem Rothen Berge bei Sonnenuntergang (The chapel on the Rotenberg).
- 1828: Blick auf Schloss Rosenstein und das Neckartal (View of Rosenstein Palace and Neckar valley).
- 1833: Kleobis und Biton (Kleobis and Biton).

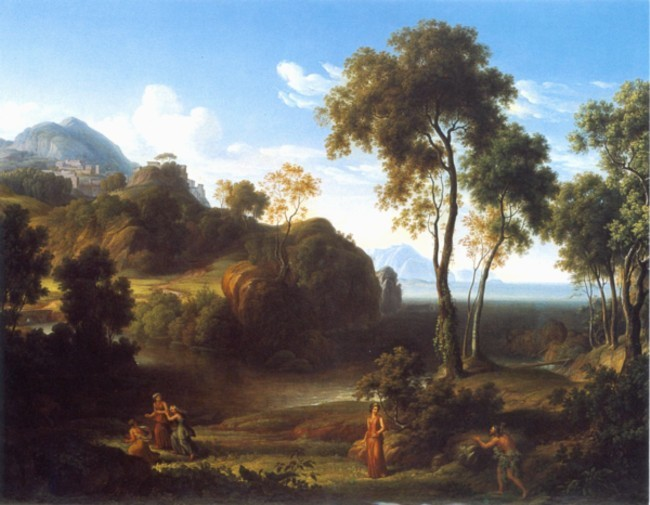
Ulysses and Nausicaa, after his arrival in Scheria
