= Henrik Weber =

Hungarian painter (1818–1866)

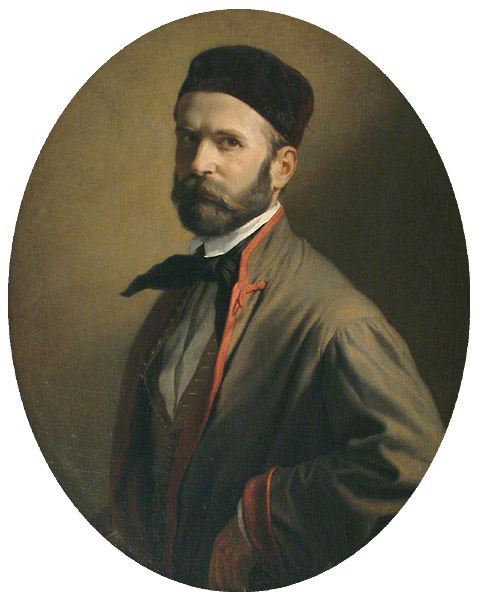
- Self-portrait, 1855
- Born: 24 May 1818; Pest, Kingdom of Hungary
- Died: 14 May 1866 (aged 47); Pest, Kingdom of Hungary
- Education: Academy of Fine Arts Vienna Academy of Fine Arts, Munich
- Known for: Painting, lithography
- Movement: Realism, Biedermeier

Henrik Wéber known as Henrik Weber (24 May 1818, in Pest – 14 May 1866, in Pest) was a Hungarian portrait and history painter in the Realism movement. He is considered as one of the most important Hungarian painters of the Biedermeier period.

Henrik Weber was as an excellent portrait painter of his time and a significant figure in Hungarian history painting. Accordingly, he was one of the members of artists working on the creation of national art in the 1830s and 1840s. His most successful paintings are the death of John Hunyadi, the King Matthias and Ilonka Szép, and the King Solomon in prison. He had a great influence on his contemporaries, and his students included Károly Lotz. In the 1860s, he made lithographs presenting Hungarian historical events for the journal “Az Ország Tükre”.

The Hungarian National Gallery preserves several paintings and drawings of this master of the Biedermeier painting.

== Early life ==
Henrik Weber was born in Pest, Kingdom of Hungary. His father, Mihaly Wéber, immigrated to Hungary from abroad and soon became a respected merchant. Wishing at all costs that his son would become a scientist, he not only did his best to train his son, but also required him to spend all his free time with books.

Although the young Weber was eager to study, he preferred painting and drawing much more and pondering on his picture books for hours. His books were filled with all sorts of magnificent figures he drew. His father once noticed this and surprised him with a master of drawing, a local artist named János Tóbiás Kaergling (1780-1845). Under whose leadership he soon made such great progress that both his teachers and colleagues encouraged him to a painter career with the best of hopes.

== Austrian period ==
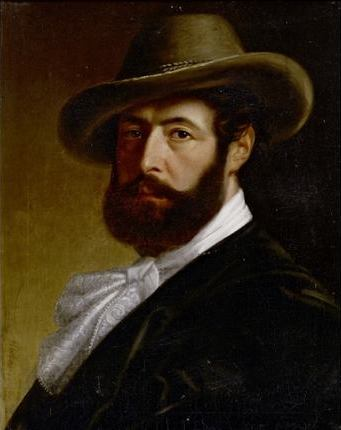
Self-portrait, 1846

After graduating from high school in 1834, he enrolled at the Vienna Academy of Fine Arts in 1835. Here, in addition to his studies, he taught art lessons, taught drawing and worked as lithographer to provide for his basic necessities of life. In particular, he was the student of Johann Ender and Leopold Kupelwieser, who taught the history of aesthetics. Under their influence, he rejected the prevailing Academicism and embraced Realism. But also, through his great diligence as well as his talent, he soon became one of the most outstanding students of the institute. This is best demonstrated by the Academy’s laudatory diplomas and the Gundel-Preis awarded in 1837, which rewarded him as the most deserving. In 1838 he took part in the exhibition "Der Fischerknabe" and "Toilette einer Braut" at the Academy of Fine Arts Vienna in Vienna with his genre paintings "Palmsonntag" in the year of his return.

== German period ==
When he returned to Hungary in 1839, he was already recognized as an artist who had exhibited abroad. But Weber's ambitions were not satisfied by his orders. Not being a portrait painter, so that, displeased with the rudimentary artistic relations, he soon traveled abroad. Already in 1840, we find it in Munich, in the company of the greatest artists of his time, Kaulbach, Cornelius, Genelli, Hess and others. He became a student at the Munich Academy of Fine Arts, where he graduated in 1842. He also interrupted this stay in Munich twice, in 1841 and 1842, during which time he visited Tyrol and Switzerland for landscape studies.

== Italian period ==
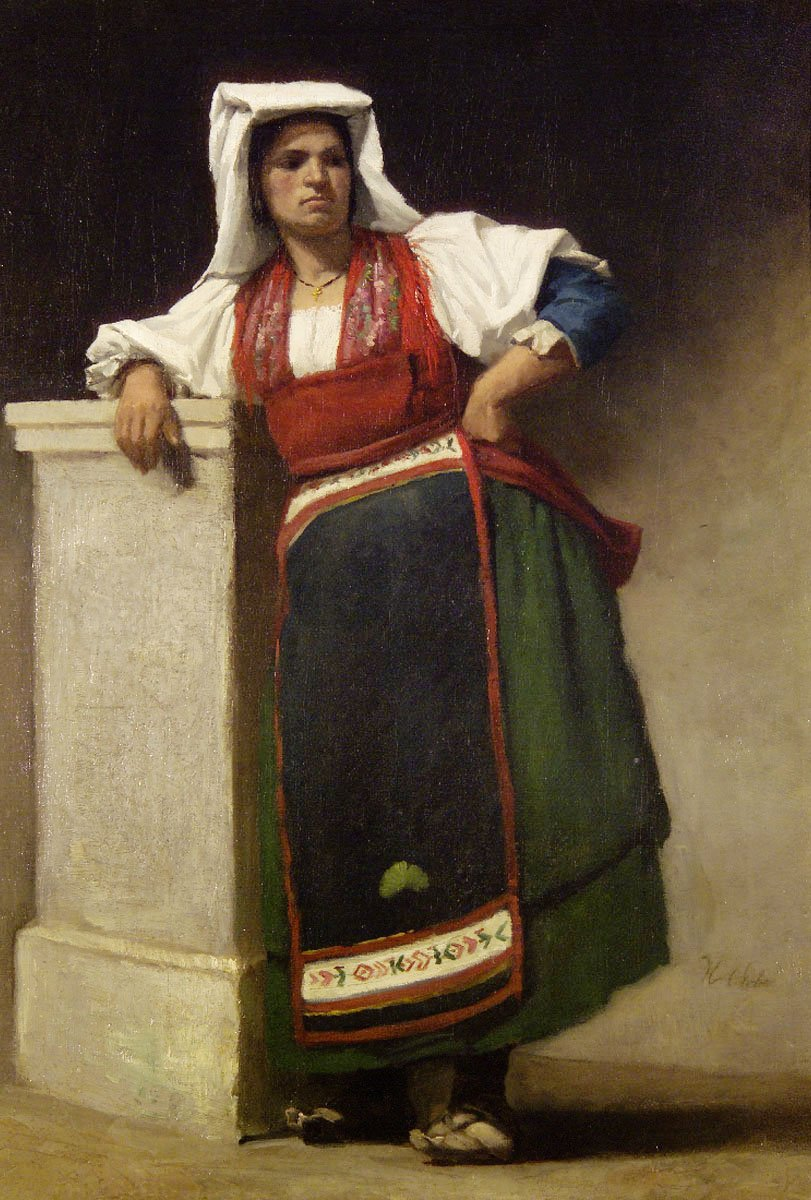
Neapolitan Woman (1846)

Then in 1845, he went on an artistic tour again through Italy until 1847. He visited Venice, Florence, Rome and Naples where he found a great inspiration. During this trip, he spent his time in the company of Carl Rahl, Eugene de Blaas, Louis Mayer, copying the works of the greatest masters like Leonardo da Vinci. Henrik Weber painted many Italian landscapes and female figures dressed in Italian folk costumes. It was here that he became acquainted with Michelangelo Grigoletti, among the newer Italians, who had a deeper influence on his art. Also, during this stay in Rome, the Invasion of King Matthias in Buda in 1458 was completed. An historical image published as a work sheet by the "Képzőművészeti Társulat" as a membership fee until 1855.

== Return to Hungary and later career ==
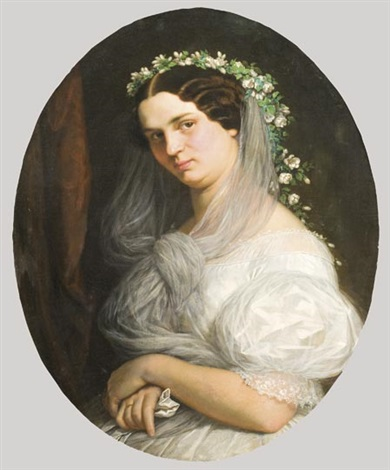
Henrik Weber's wife (1858)

After returning home from Italy, Weber settled permanently in Budapest, where he received orders for many portraits and other works from well-known families and personalities. So, he was no longer forced to travel abroad. In 1858 he married Anna Calderoni, his last wife. In the 1860s, he made several lithographs presenting the history of the Huns, the Árpád dynasty and the Hunyadi family for the journal “Az Ország Tükre”. In the midst of success, he became ill in the 1860s and died in Pest on May 14, 1866 at the age of 47.

== Legacy ==
The influence of Viennese Biedermeier portrait and life painting, which preserves the values of the family-centered civic mentality, on family portraits (The Weber Family, 1846, Budapest Gallery; composer Mihály Mosonyi and his wife, Hungarian National Gallery) and on his life paintings (The Children's Room, 1840). In most of his historical compositions he worked on events related to the Hunyadi family (death of John Hunyadi, 1844; invasion of King Matthias to Buda, 1853, Hungarian National Museum). The painting depicting the gallant adventure of (King Matthias and the beautiful shepherdess in Buda, 1845, private property) is an outstanding domestic work of the historical genre painting. His Hungaria, painted in the early 1840s, symbolized the self-consciousness of a glorious past and the hope of a prosperous, peaceful future. In the 1860s, he made lithographs (Béla's answer between crown and sword, 1862) presenting the history of the Huns, the Árpád dynasty and the Hunyadi family for the journal “Az Ország tükre”.

== Gallery ==
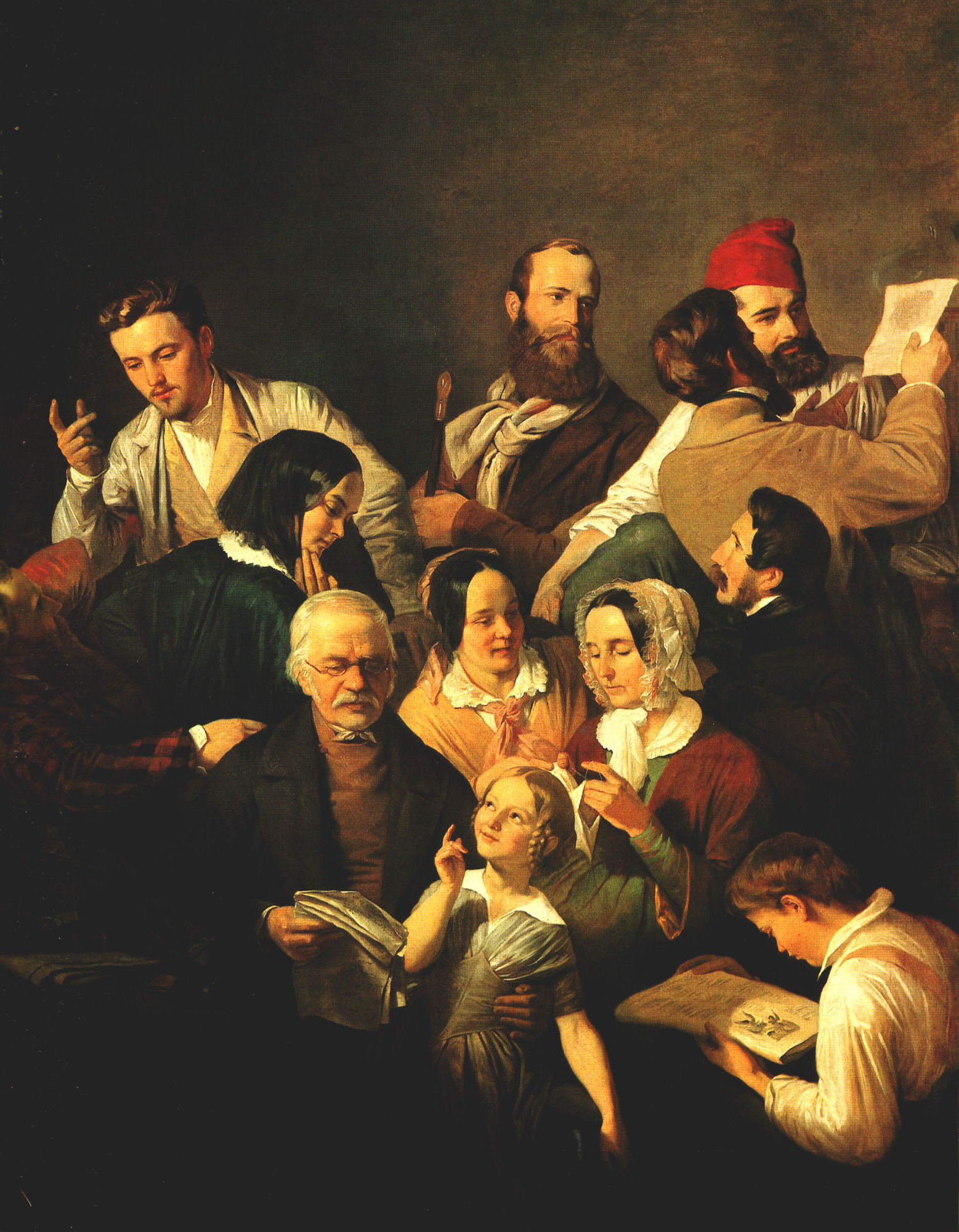
The Weber Family (1846)

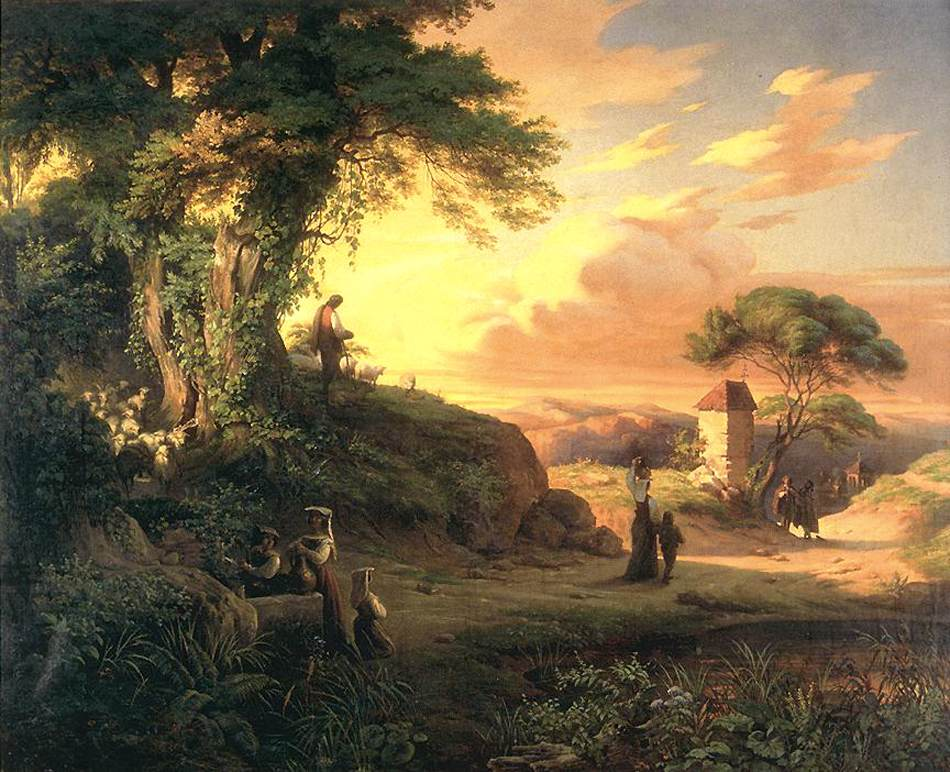
Romantic Scene (1851)

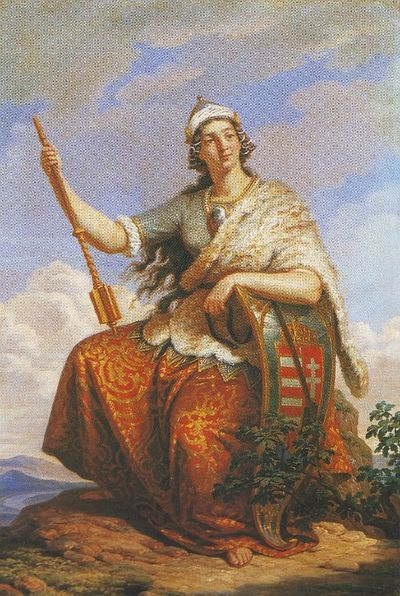
Hungaria (1840s)

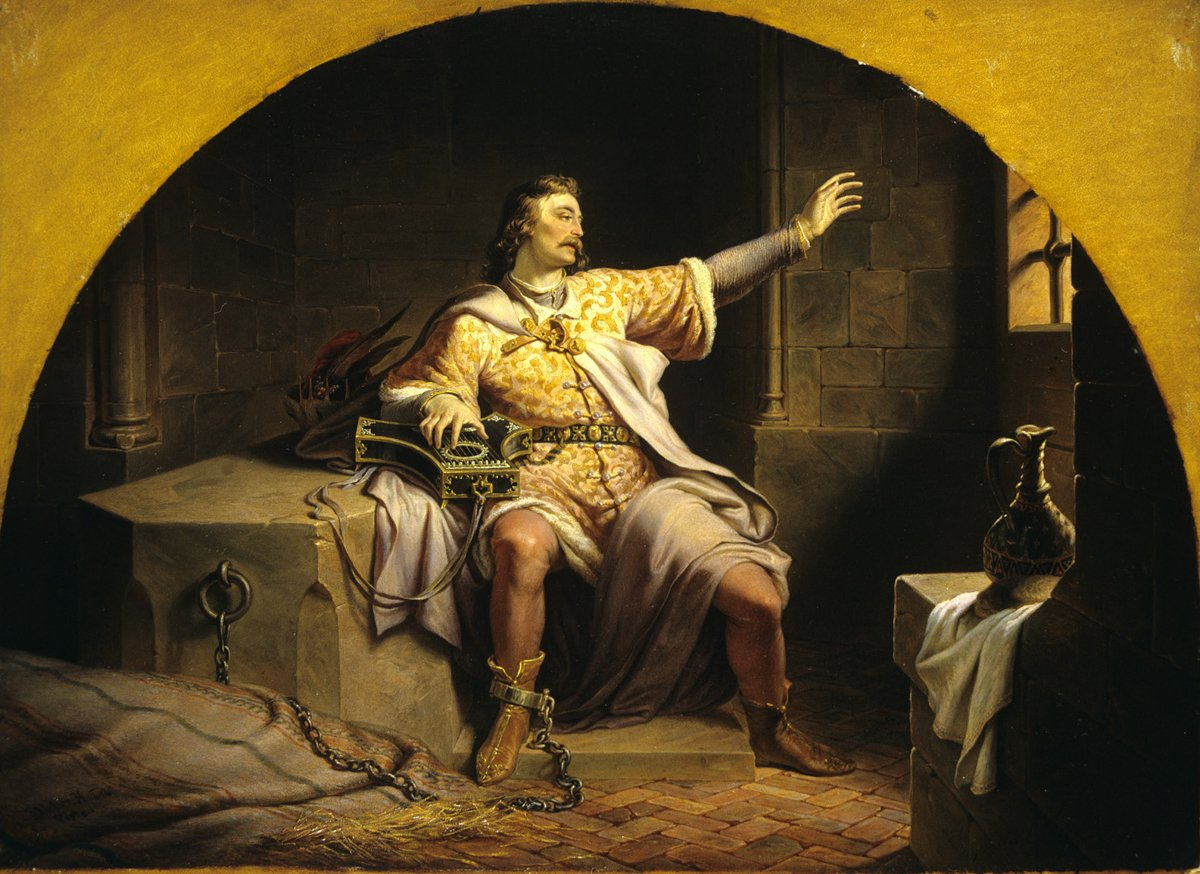
King Solomon in Prison (1847)

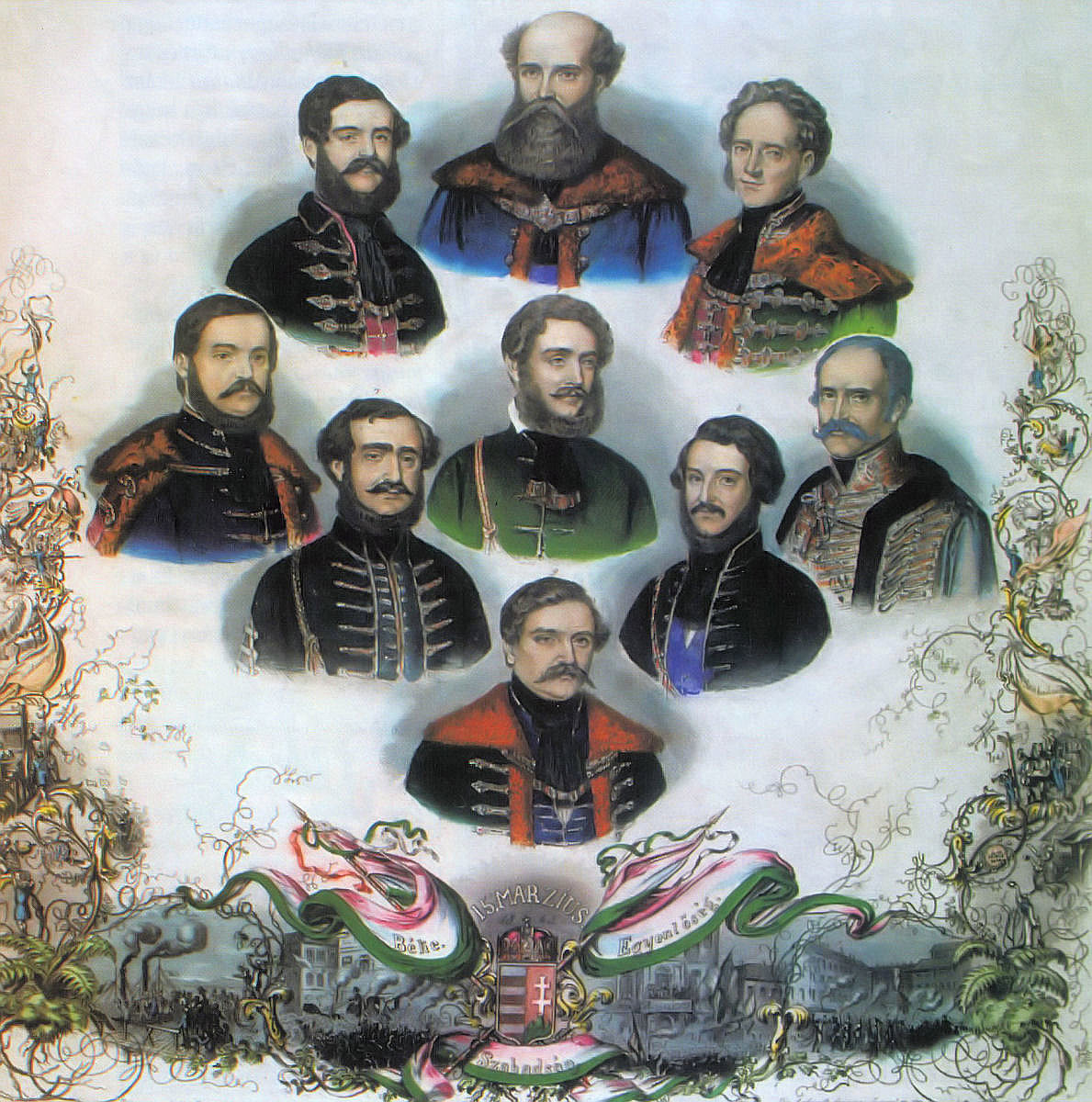
Batthyány Government (1848)

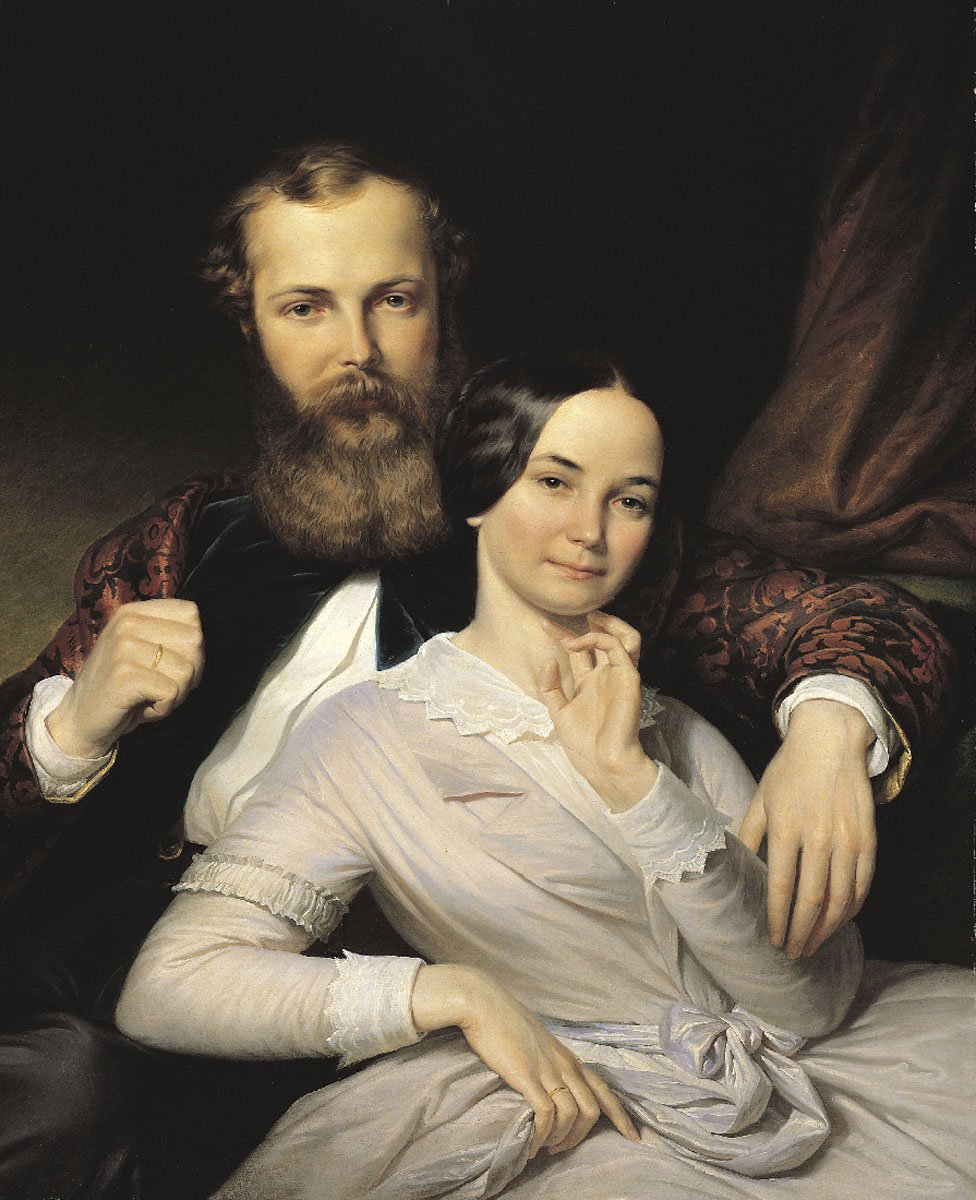
Composer Mihály Mosonyi and his Wife (1840)

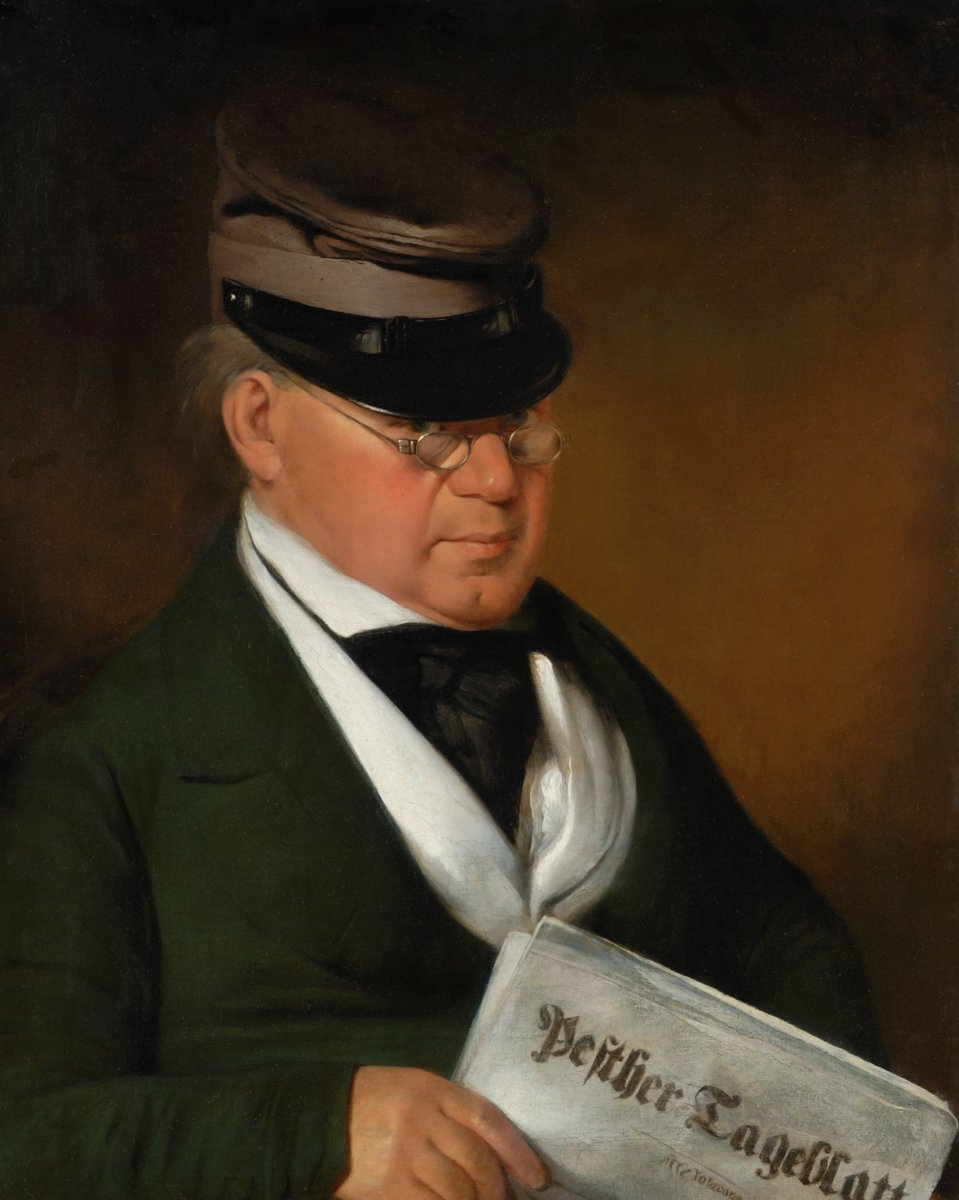
Pesti polgár (1840s)

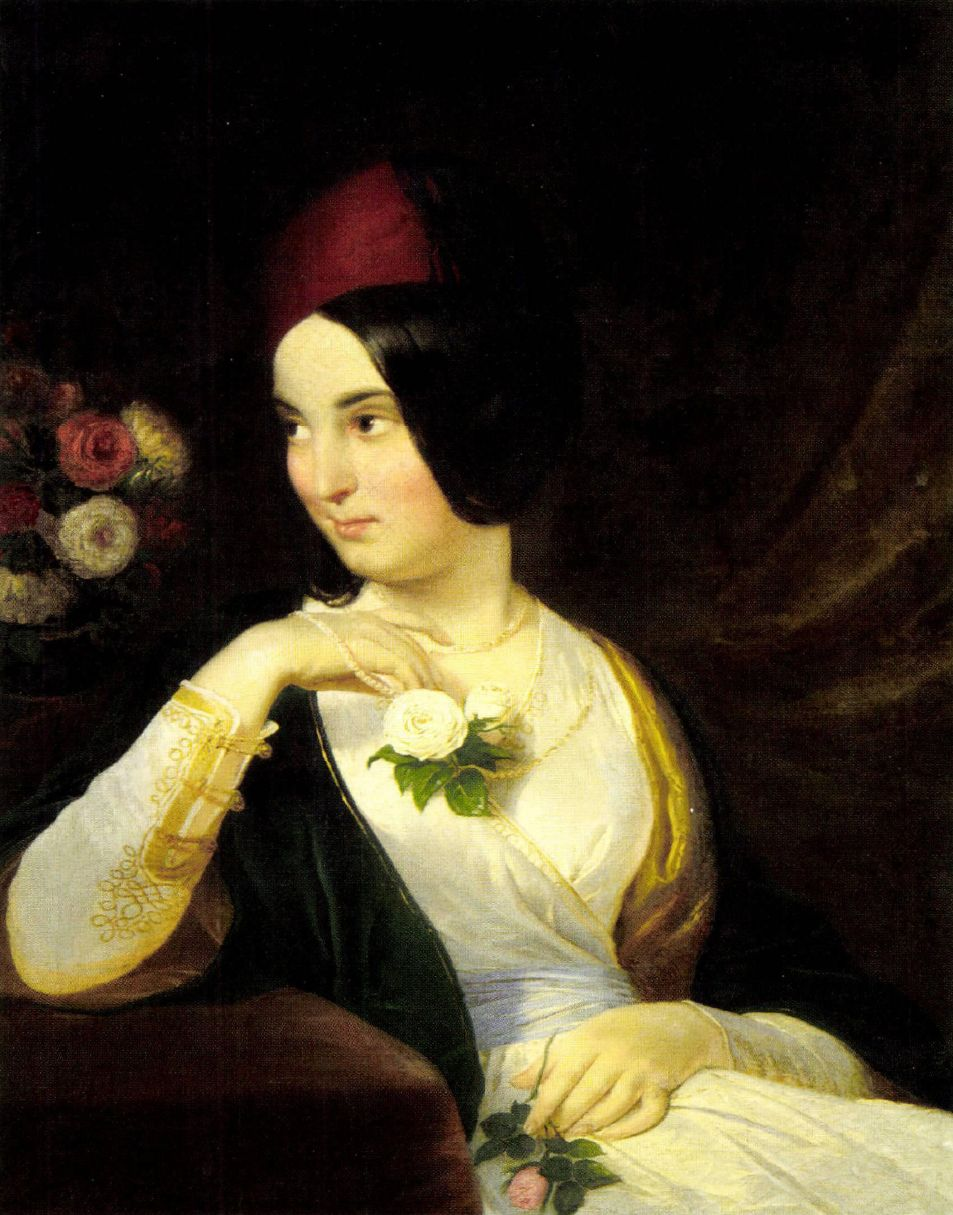
Greek Woman (1844)

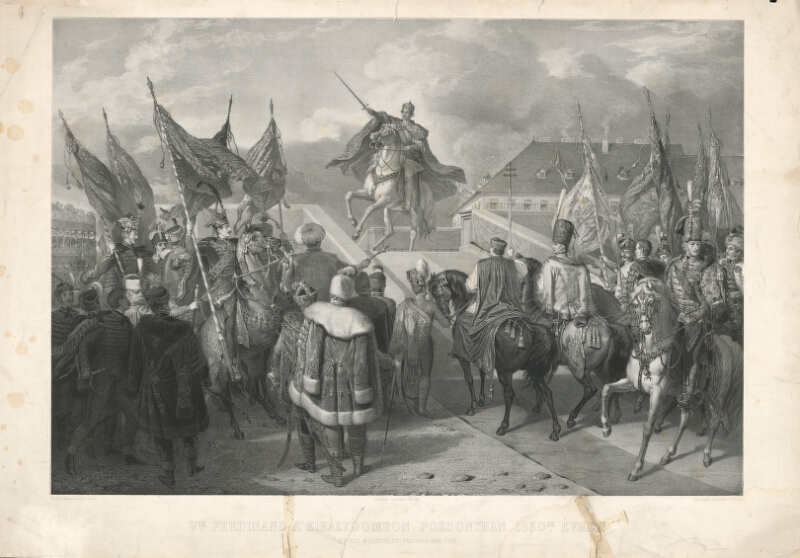
Ferdinand V on the coronation hill (1858)

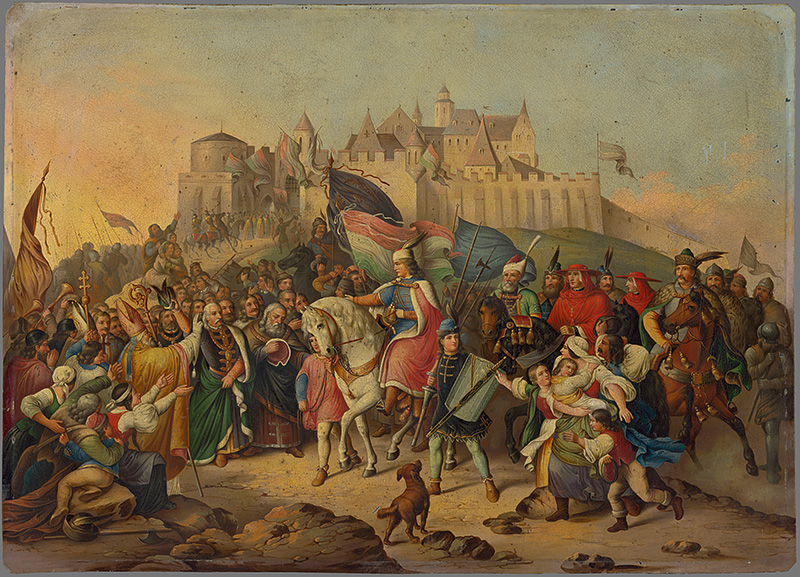
King Matthias' arrival in Buda (1846)

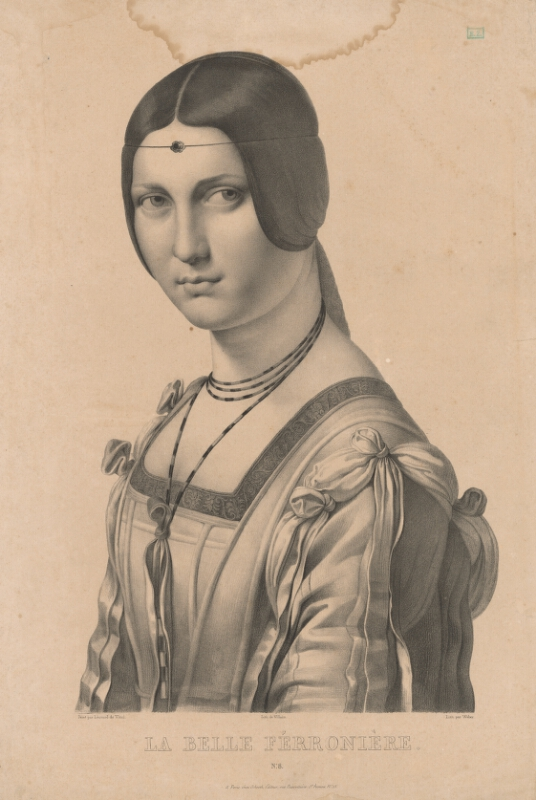
La Belle Ferronière of Leonardo da Vinci (1830s)

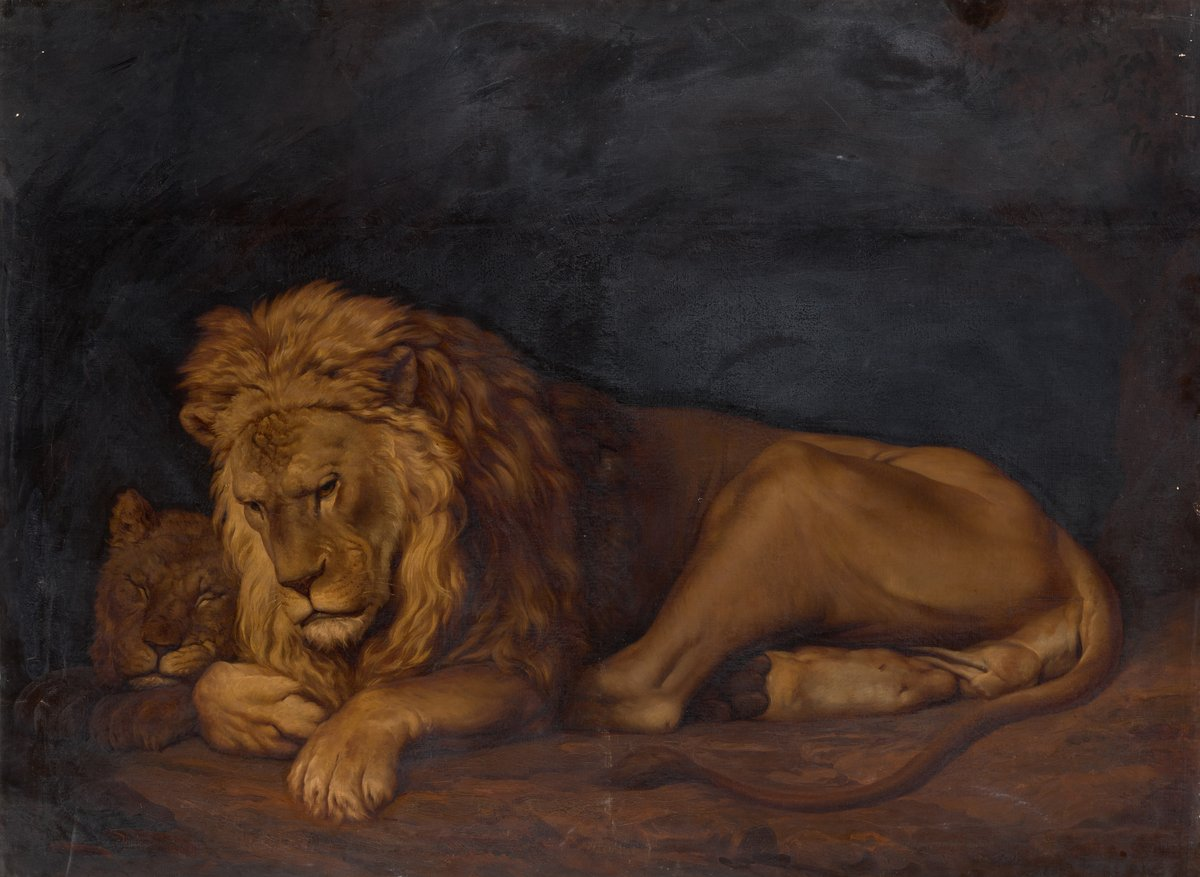
Resting Lions (1852)

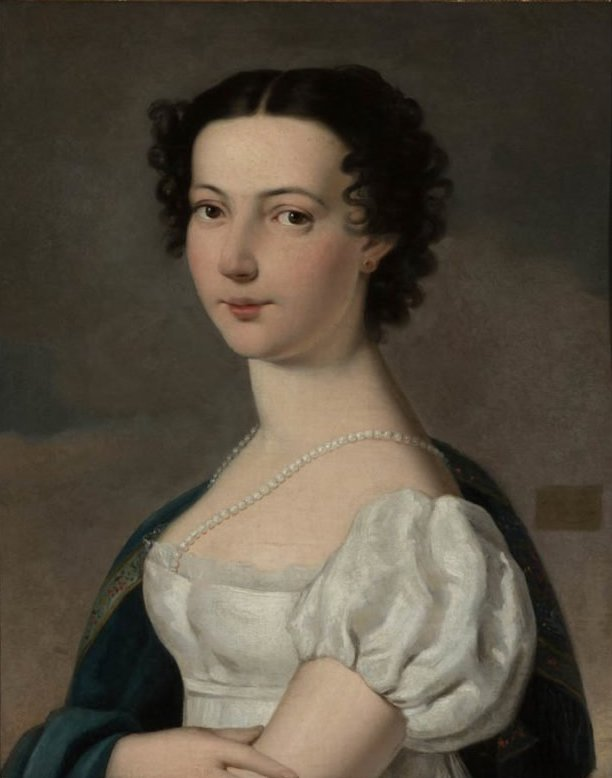
Female portrait (1850s)

== Citations ==
"István Ferenczy, Henrik Weber, Markó the Younger and Miklós Izsó left us emblematic representations of the 19th century image of the nation. Along with them, they conferred the task of inquiring into a deeper historical understanding of the works and their ideas. If these represent an enduring self-image, then we are also charged with the task of reinterpreting them from time to time. From a National Imagination to an Image-creating Nation: Ideas about the Origins of Hungarian Art."

– Erzsébet Király from the book Art and Nation: Image and Self-Image (p. 138).
