= Ludwig Jesselson =

German-born metal trader

- Born: Ludwig Jesselson; August 29, 1910; Neckarbischofsheim, Baden-Württemberg, German Empire
- Died: April 3, 1993 (age 82)
- Occupation: Metal trader
- Known for: CEO and President of Philipp Brothers
- Spouse: Erica Pappenheim
- Children: 3

Ludwig Jesselson (August 29, 1910 – April 3, 1993) was a German-born metal trader who served as president and CEO of Philipp Brothers.

== Biography ==
=== Early years ===
Ludwig Jesselson was born on August 29, 1910, to an Orthodox Jewish family in Neckarbischofsheim, Baden-Württemberg, the son of Amalie (née Zucker) and Samuel Max Jesselson. His father headed the local Jewish congregation and owned a small store. He had two older brothers Sigmund and Albert. In May 1927, he secured an apprenticeship with the metal trading company Aron Hirsch & Sohn in Halberstadt and became a full-time employee in November 1928. The company did not survive the economic collapse of 1929 although Jesselson secured employment with Erze und Metalle Hirsch Aktiengesellschaft, a company established to continue the trading activities of the Hirsch family where he worked his way up to be in charge of the scrap department.

=== From Germany to the US ===
In 1933, with the rise of Adolf Hitler, he left Germany to work for another Hirsch family-owned firm in the Netherlands, Groma N.V., where he met Julius Philipp, another German-Jewish emigree metal trader. In 1934, Phillip introduced him to Siegfried Ullmann who was in charge of Philipp Brothers in New York. In 1937, as the situation in Europe became more difficult, Jesselson inquired of Ullmann for a position in New York City and was hired due to his extensive knowledge of the scrap business. Up to then, Philipp Brothers had focused on smaller transactions dealing directly with dealers and distributors rather than end-users; Jesselson pushed for larger transactions and longer-term contracts dealing directly with the end-users.

=== During the War ===
In 1939, he was given responsibility for a new venture, Filbro Overseas Corporation, tasked with developing Philipp Brothers sale and export of metals and ores from South America and the Far East. The venture did not come to fruition due to the outbreak of World War II during which Jesselson worked to secure mineral assets for the use of the United States war effort with a focus on outbidding German purchasers of minerals and metals in neutral countries. In 1945, the company was broken up with Siegfried Bendheim taking the chemical business and establishing a new company, Philipp Brothers Chemicals, Inc., while the metals business remained under the control of Ullmann (partner and president), Arturo Gruenebaum (partner), and Jesselson (partner, director, and treasurer).

=== Leading the firm ===
After the war, Philipp Brothers focused on acquiring leftover materials from the war which paid off handsomely when demand and pricing spiked during the Korean War. The company increased its staffing levels from 40 employees in 1945 to 200 employees in 1955. Jesselson effectively took control of the firm by the mid-1950s, as Ullman and Gruenebaum were getting on in age. Ullmann eventually retired in 1962.

=== Growing the firm through mergers and acquisitions ===
In 1956, the firm took on minority partners which backfired when Gruenebaum died in 1958 and Jesselson and Ullman did not have the cash to buy out Gruenebaum's share. Fearing dilution of their control, they secured advice from André Meyer of Lazard Frères who suggested that they take the firm public via a merger with Minerals & Chemical Corporation of America, a mining and processing firm (in which Meyer also had an interest). The IPO was completed In 1960 and the new firm named Minerals & Chemicals Philipps Corporation. Jesselson merged the company with Engelhard Industries In 1967, again under the suggestion of André Meyer (founded by Charles Engelhard who owned a minority interest in Minerals & Chemicals Philipps Corporation), forming Engelhard Minerals & Chemicals Corporation.

=== Trading in times of decolonization ===
Jesselson focused on the needs of new countries formed from decolonization which needed capital to develop their resources and channels to sell their production: Philipps Brothers loaned funds to develop new mines using the metals and minerals produced as collateral with the condition that Philipp Brothers would also secure exclusive long-term sales contracts to sell the output of the mines.

=== The changing oil trade ===
In the 1970s, Jesselson involved the firm in petroleum trading encouraging the firm's manager in Spain, Marc Rich, to team up with logistics expert Pincus Green, to develop innovative transactions to profit from oil trading which at the time was controlled by OPEC and the top seven western oil producers. In February 1974, after Jesselon reprimanded Rich and Green for committing to a long-term oil contract, the pair left the company to establish a competitor under the name of Marc Rich + Company AG. In 1981, the metal trading portion of the business was spun off as Phibro Corporation.

Jesselson was replaced by David Tendler In 1975, although continued on as chairman.

== Philanthropy ==
Jesselson served as a board member (1961–1977), treasurer (1977–1989), and chairman of the board (1989–1993) for Yeshiva University. He and his wife founded the Yeshiva University Museum in 1973; endowed a chair of mathematics at The Hebrew University; and were prominent donors to the Israel Museum and the Israel Philharmonic Orchestra (where his wife served on the boards). He and his wife received honorary doctorates from The Hebrew University's National Library.

== Personal life ==
In 1949, he married Erica Pappenheim, a Jewish refugee from Nazi Germany; they had three sons. Jesselson died on April 3, 1993, at the Shaare Zedek Medical Center in Jerusalem. His wife died in 2008.

== Sources ==
- Blas, Javier; Farchy, Jack (2021). The World For Sale: Money, Power, and the Traders Who Barter the Earth's Resources. Oxford University Press. ISBN 978-0190078959.
