= Mihály Mosonyi =

Hungarian composer

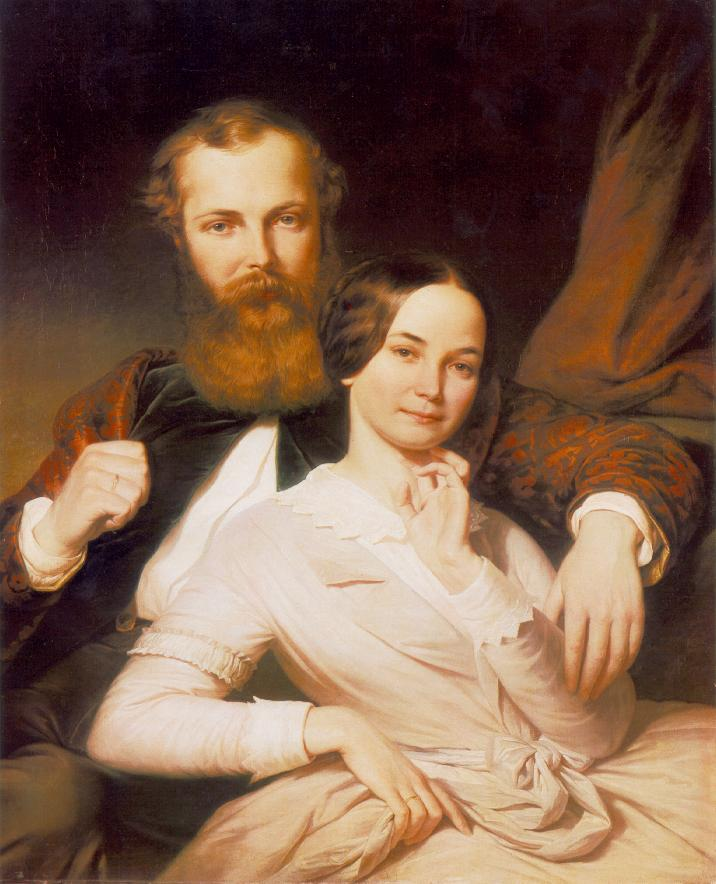
Mihály Mosonyi and his wife, by Henrik Weber (1840s)

Mihály Mosonyi (4 September 1815 in Boldogasszony, Austria-Hungary – 31 October 1870 in Budapest) was a Hungarian composer. Born Michael Brand, he changed his name to Mosonyi in honor of the district of Moson (where his place of birth was located), with Mihály being the Hungarian equivalent of "Michael". Like many of his peers, he was interested in creating a Hungarian musical style.

Mosonyi was primarily an instrumental composer, writing much piano music, especially of Hungarian character i.e. Hungarian Children's World, Studies for Piano for Development in the Performance of Hungarian Music. His best-known works include Funeral Music and the Feast of Purification. He also composed a Piano Concerto in E minor (1844), two symphonies, five masses, three operas (the most famous is the Szep Ilonka), chamber music (including seven String Quartets, a String Sextet and two Piano Trios.).,

Franz Liszt wrote a late piano piece in memory of Mosonyi, called Mosonyi Gyázmenete (Escorting Mosonyi to the Grave) (S194, 1870).
