= Karl Mayer (poet) =

German jurist

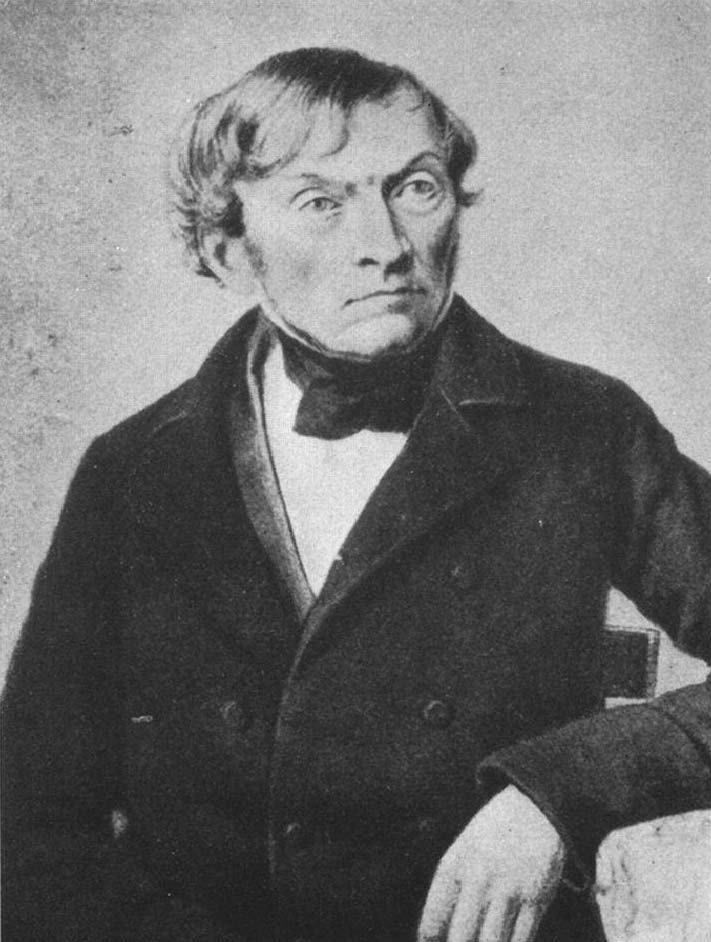
Karl Mayer.

Karl Friedrich Hartmann Mayer (22 March 1786 in Bischofsheim – 25 February 1870 in Tübingen) was a German jurist and poet of the Swabian school of poets, the circle of Justinus Kerner and the Serach poets' circle under count Alexander von Württemberg (1801–1844). His younger brother Louis Mayer was a landscape painter.
