= Karl Jakob Theodor Leybold =

German painter, engraver and lithographer

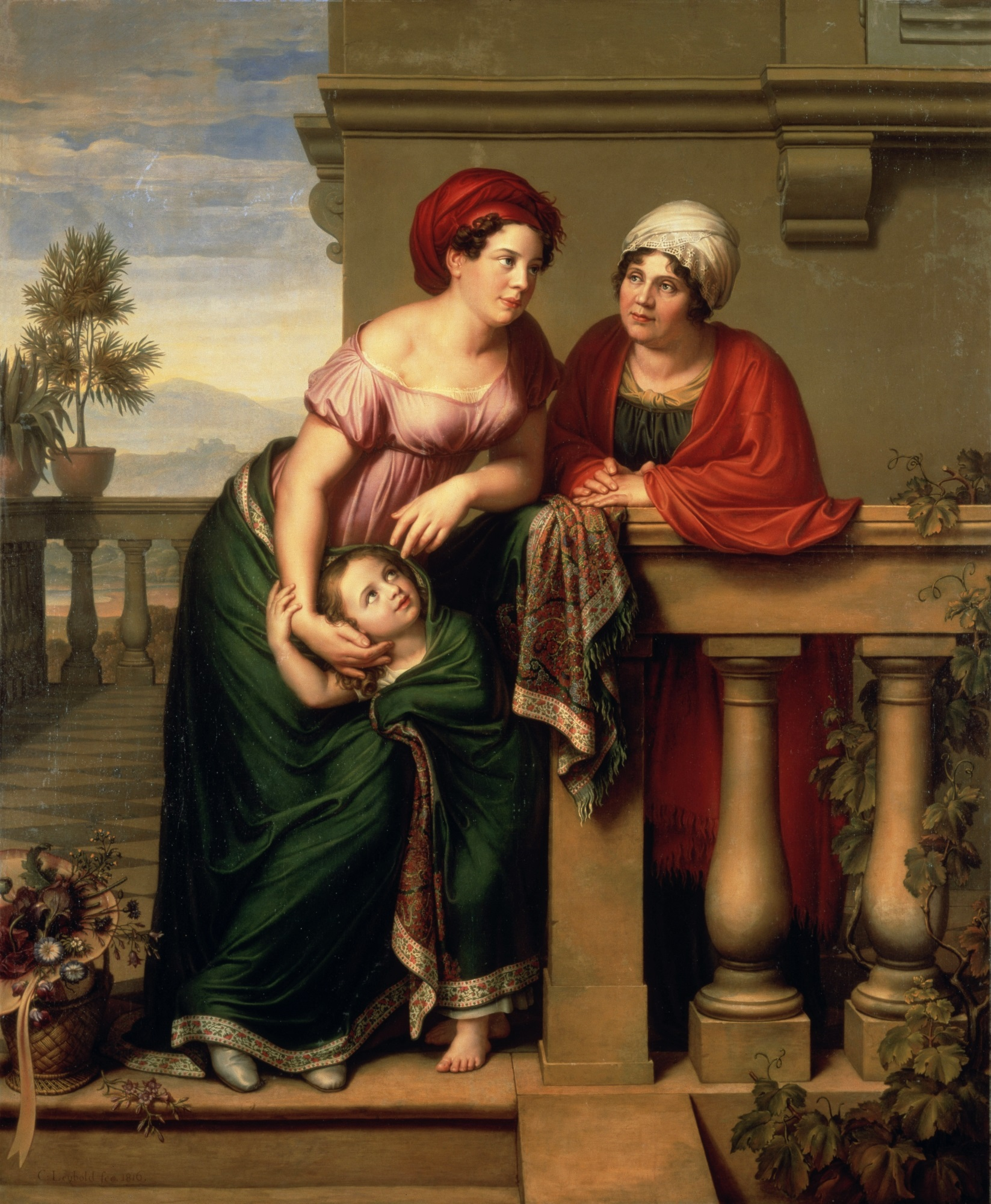
The Actress' Family

Karl Jakob Theodor Leybold (19 March 1786, Stuttgart - 20 July 1844, Stuttgart) was a German painter, engraver and lithographer.

== Biography ==
He was born to the miniaturist and copper engraver, Johann Friedrich Leybold, who also taught engraving in Vienna. It was there, at the Academy of Fine Arts, that Karl received his artistic training. One his father's associates, Eberhard von Wächter, had a major influence on his choice of subject matter and style.

In 1807, thanks to a grant from the art patron and collector, Count Moritz von Fries, he was able to travel to Rome, where he studied and worked until 1814. Then, after a few more years in Vienna, where he earned his living painting portraits, he returned to Stuttgart in 1821, where he later served as a professor at the State Academy of Fine Arts (from 1829), and Inspector at the old Staatsgalerie (from 1842). He was named an honorary member of the Vienna Academy in 1836.

His 1826 depiction of Charon was personally praised by Goethe.

Three of his brothers were also artists: Edward Friedrich, Heinrich Gustav Adolf and Rudolf Moritz (1806-1857). One of his sisters married the landscape painter, Gottlob Friedrich Steinkopf, who had studied with his father.

== Gallery ==
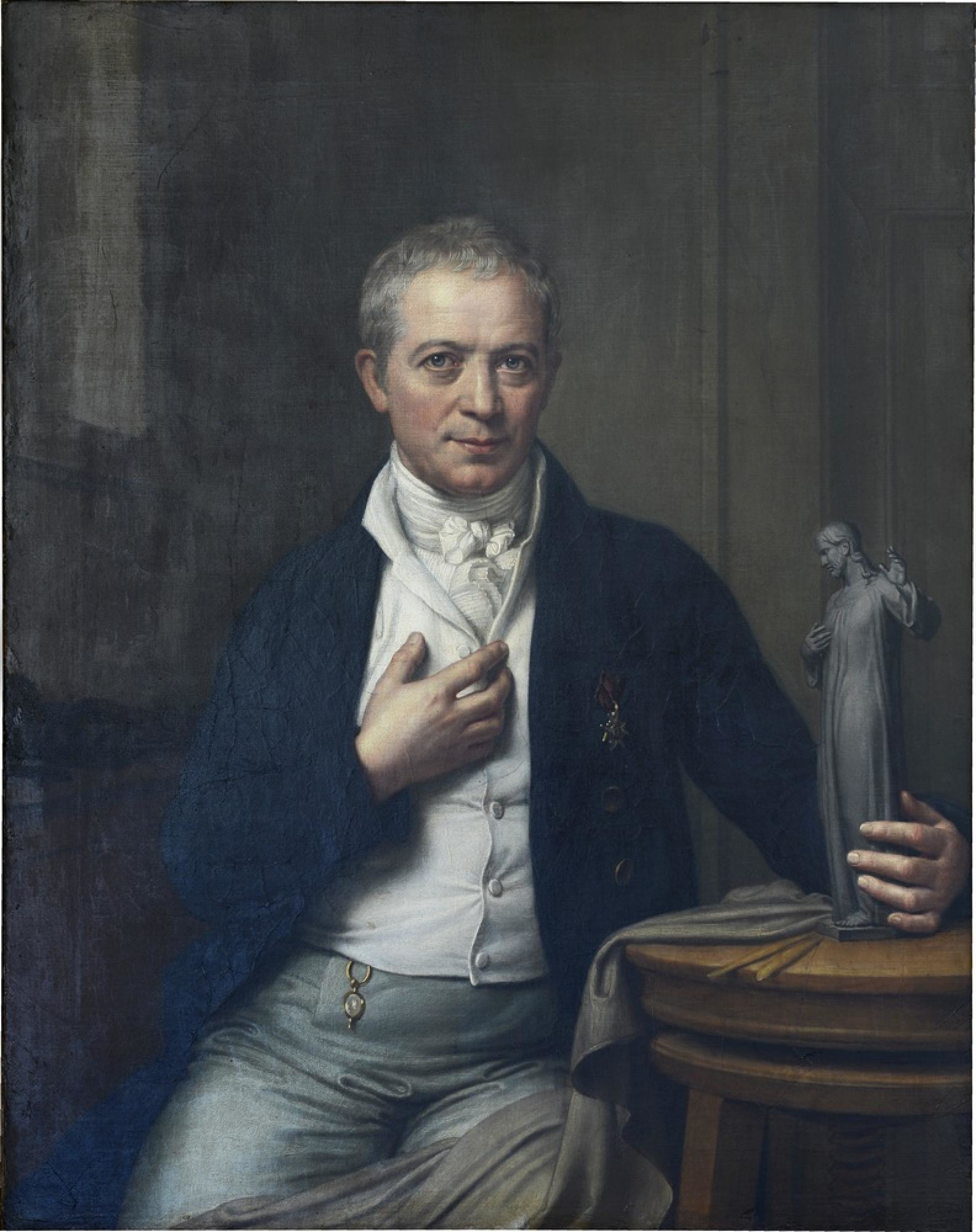
Portrait of Johann Heinrich Dannecker, 1822

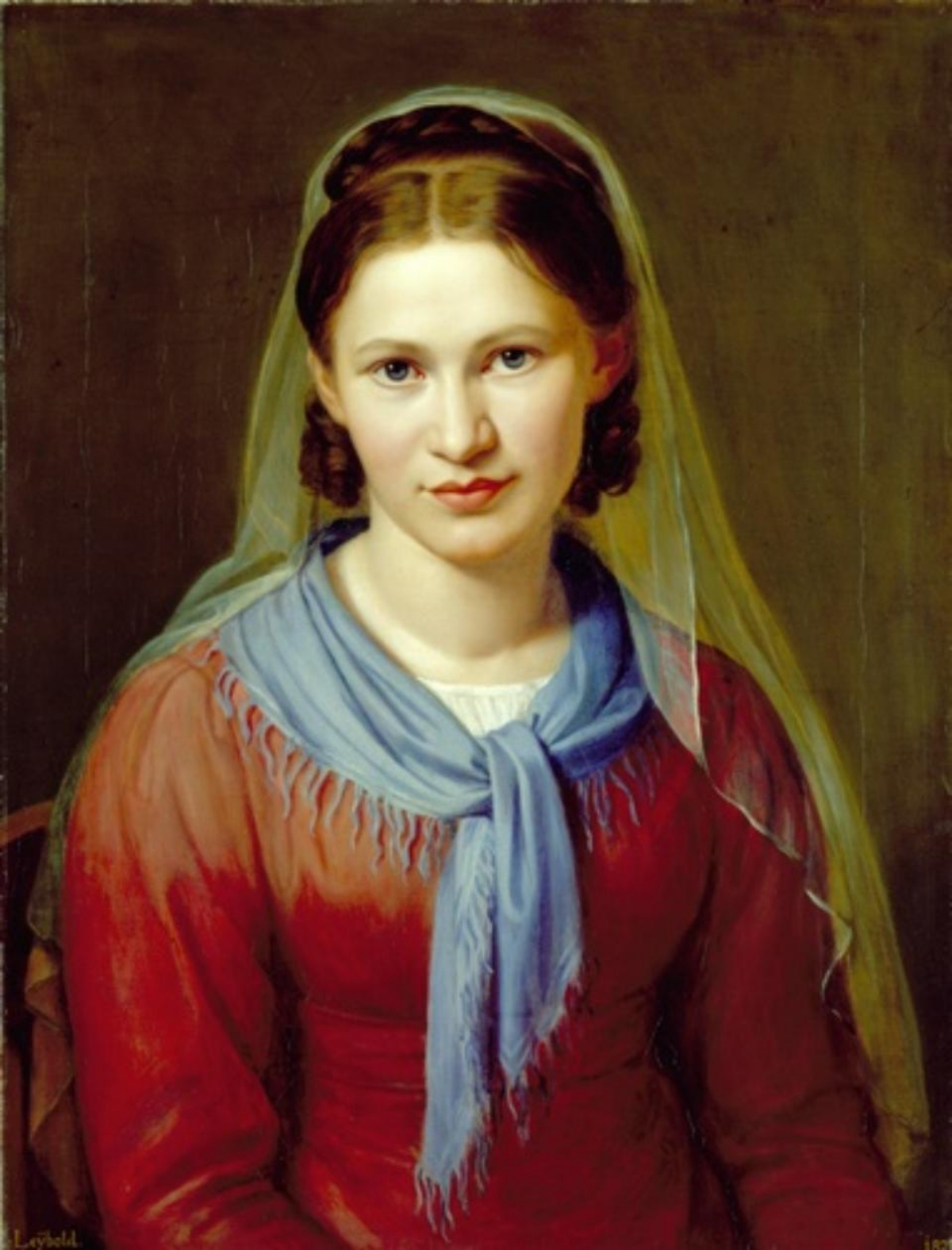
Portrait of Friederike von Dannecker, née Kolb, 1827

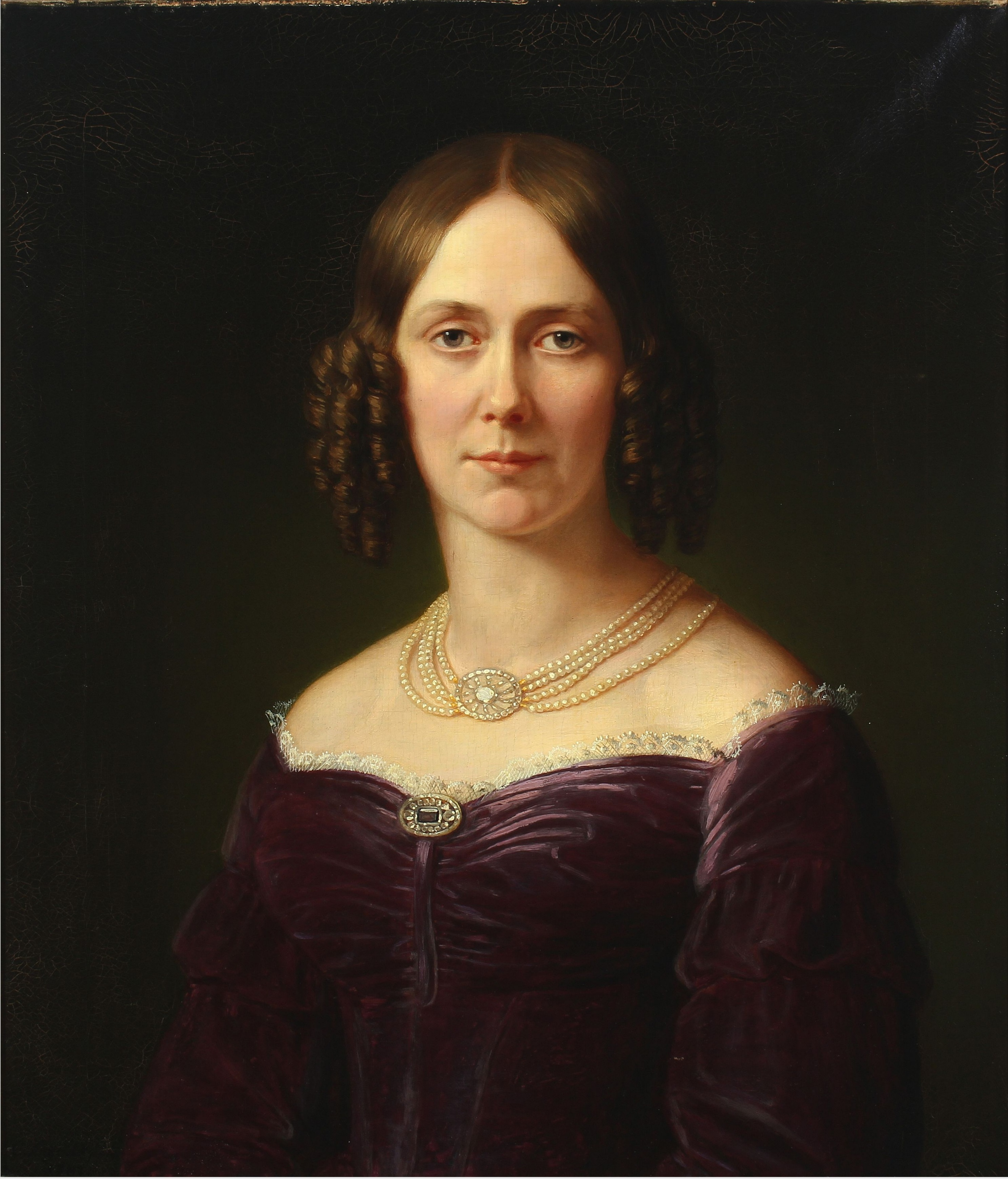
Portrait of Pauline Freifrau von Koenig-Warthausen (1805-1872), 1842

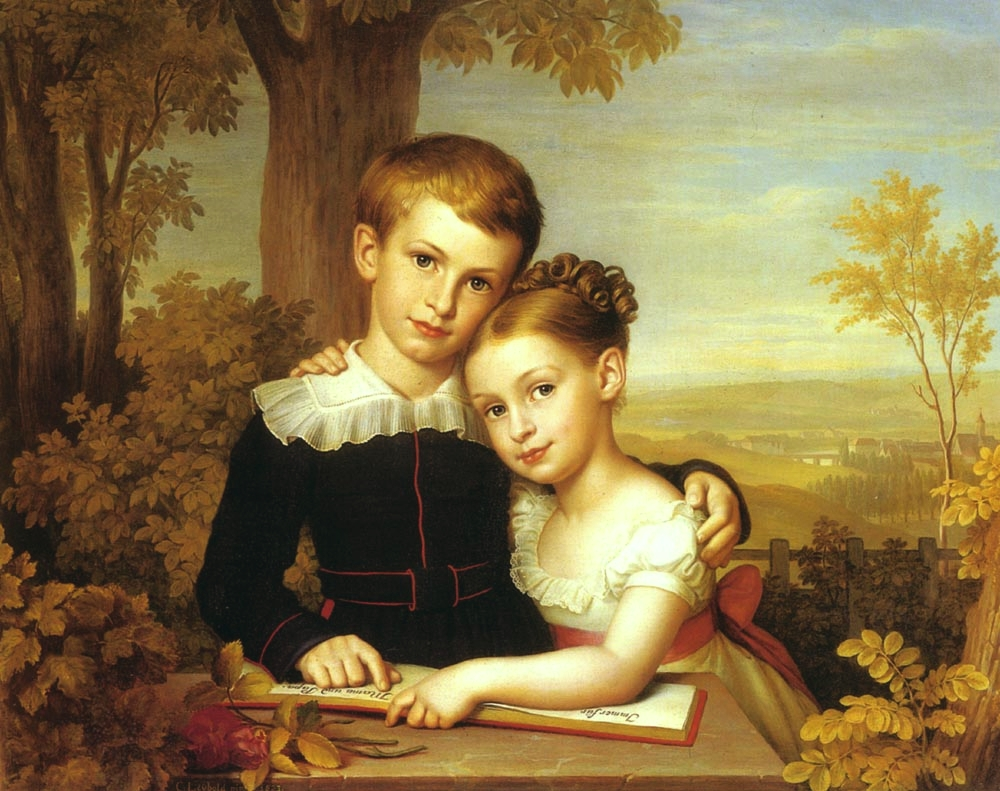
Portrait of two children with an extensive landscape beyond, 1823

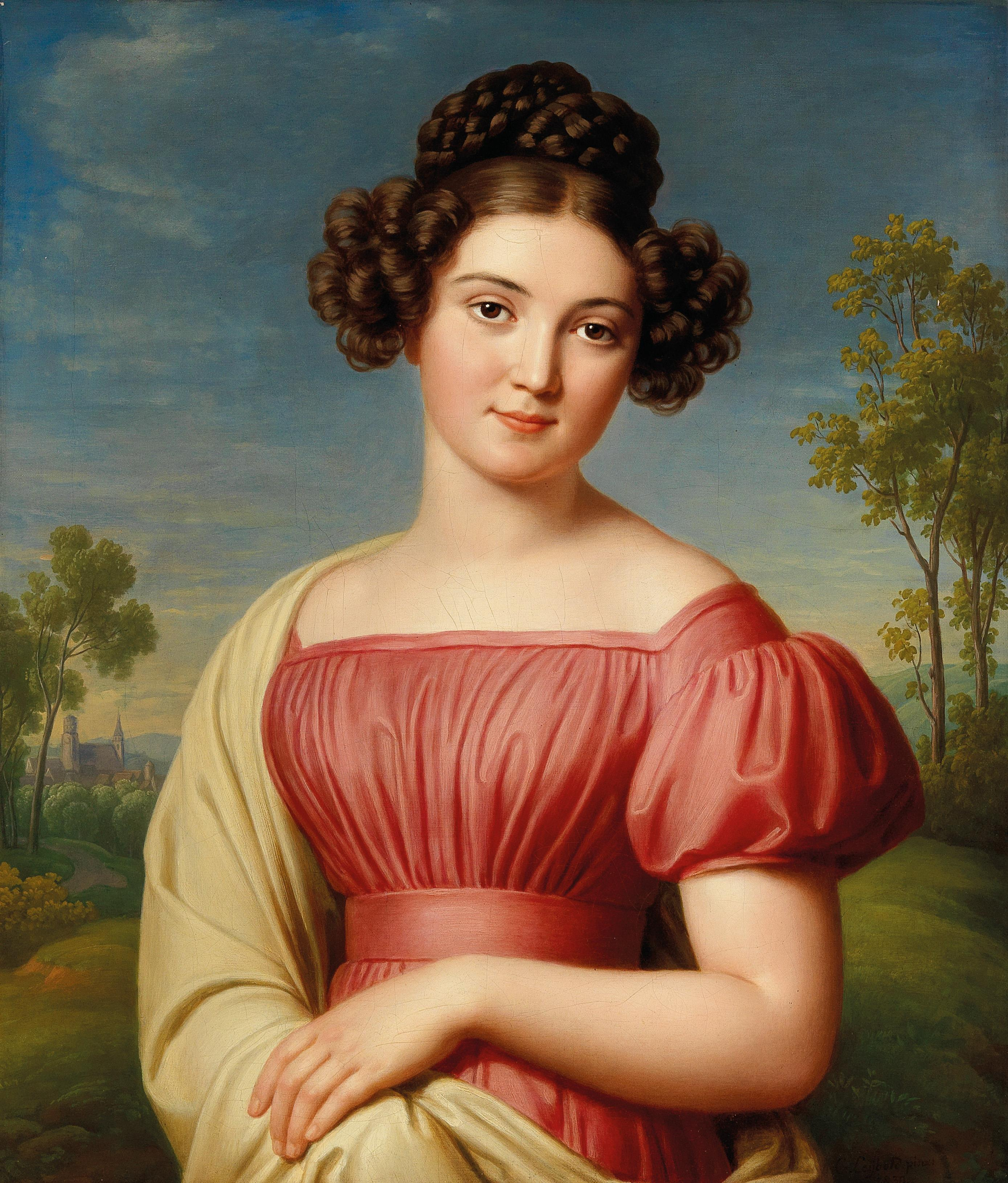
Portrait of a Lady, 1830

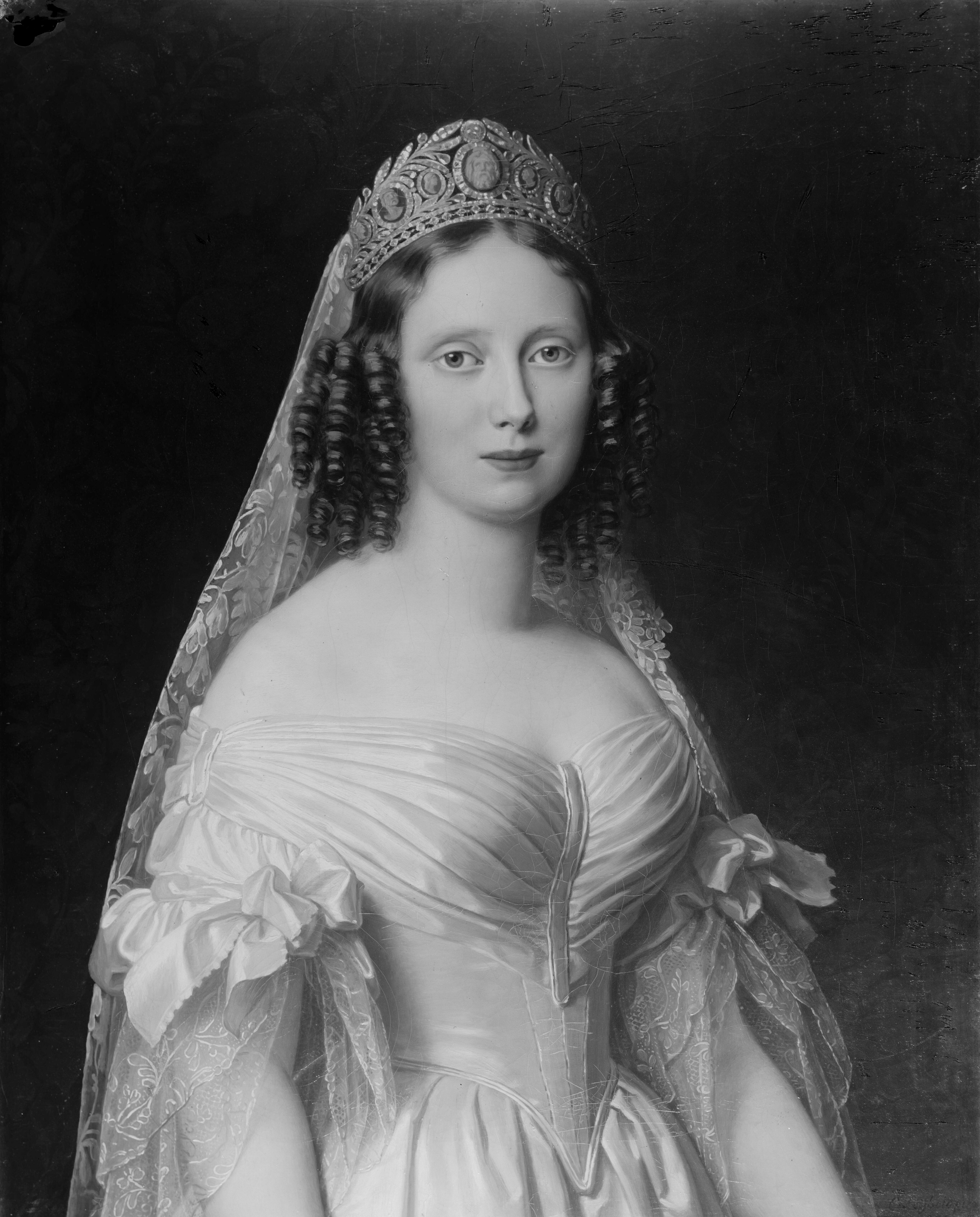
Princess Sophie of Württemberg, 1839
