= Axel Schock =

German journalist and author (born 1965)

- Born: 11 September 1965; Neckarbischofsheim, Germany
- Occupation: writer

Axel Schock (born 11 September 1965 in Neckarbischofsheim, Baden-Württemberg) is a German journalist and author.

Schock grew up in Sinsheim. He studied literature and theater at the Free University of Berlin. In 1982 he published his first work and in 1985 received the Scheffelpreis, a prize in literature awarded to high school graduates.

He lives as an openly gay man in Berlin and works as a journalist and editor for different magazines and newspapers, including the gay magazine Hinnerk in Hamburg and citymag Berlin. As a freelance author, he writes articles for daily newspapers like Berliner Zeitung, taz and Berliner Morgenpost. Schock also writes features for radio (for example RIAS Berlin, DeutschlandRadio and Radio 100) and for TV. He has also written under a pseudonym.

In 2023, he was awarded the Deutsche AIDS-Stiftung's Media Prize for "his decades of continouus and knowledgeable reporting on HIV/Aids". His writing is described as "calm, scientifically sound, informative... and he does not shy away from adressing uncomfortable topics."

Together with Corinna Gekeler, he is the initiator and curator of a collection on the history of HIV/Aids, which complements the Haeberle-Hirschfeld-Archive at Humboldt University in Berlin.

Since 2013, Axel Schock has been responsible for the overall organization of the Posiefestival Berlin.

In 2026, Axel Schock published “AIDS: Chronicle of a Pandemic,” the first global history of HIV/Aids.

== Selected works (in German) ==
- Schreib-Spuren. (Co-Editor) (1993)
- Zehn Minuten. Jetzt. Kürzestgeschichten. (1993)
- I'm crazy for das Holzfällerhemd. (1994)
- Der schwule Sprachführer. (with Ulf Meyer) (1996)
- Out!: 800 berühmte Lesben, Schwule und Bisexuelle. (with Karen-Susan Fessel), 5. Edition. (2004)
- Das Queer Quiz Buch. (with Ulrike Anhamm) (1996)
- Ein letzter Gruß. Trauer – Anatomie eines Gefühls. (1997)
- Die Bibliothek von Sodom. Das Buch der schwulen Bücher. (1998)
- Die Cazzo-Story. Pornostars, made in Germany. (2000)
- Die acapickels drücken sich aus. (2000)
- Der schöne Mann ist tot. Beiträge zum Literaturpreis der Schwulen Buchläden. (Editor, 2003)
- Out im Kino. Das lesbisch-schwule Filmlexikon. (with Manuela Kay) (2004)
- Out-Takes Das lesbisch-schwule Lexikon des unnützen Wissens. (with Karin Schupp) (2005)
- Mein schwules Auge 3. (with Rinaldo Hopf) (2006)
- Schwule Orte. 150 berühmt-berüchtigte Schauplätze (2007)
- Mein schwules Auge 4. (with Rinaldo Hopf) (2007)
- Mein schwules Auge 5. (with Rinaldo Hopf) (2008)
- Mein schwules Auge 6. (with Rinaldo Hopf) (2009)
- Aids. Chronik einer Pandemie (2026)

== Prizes ==
- Scheffelpreis, 1985
- Literaturpreis der Schwulen Buchläden
