= Neckarbischofsheim =

- Town
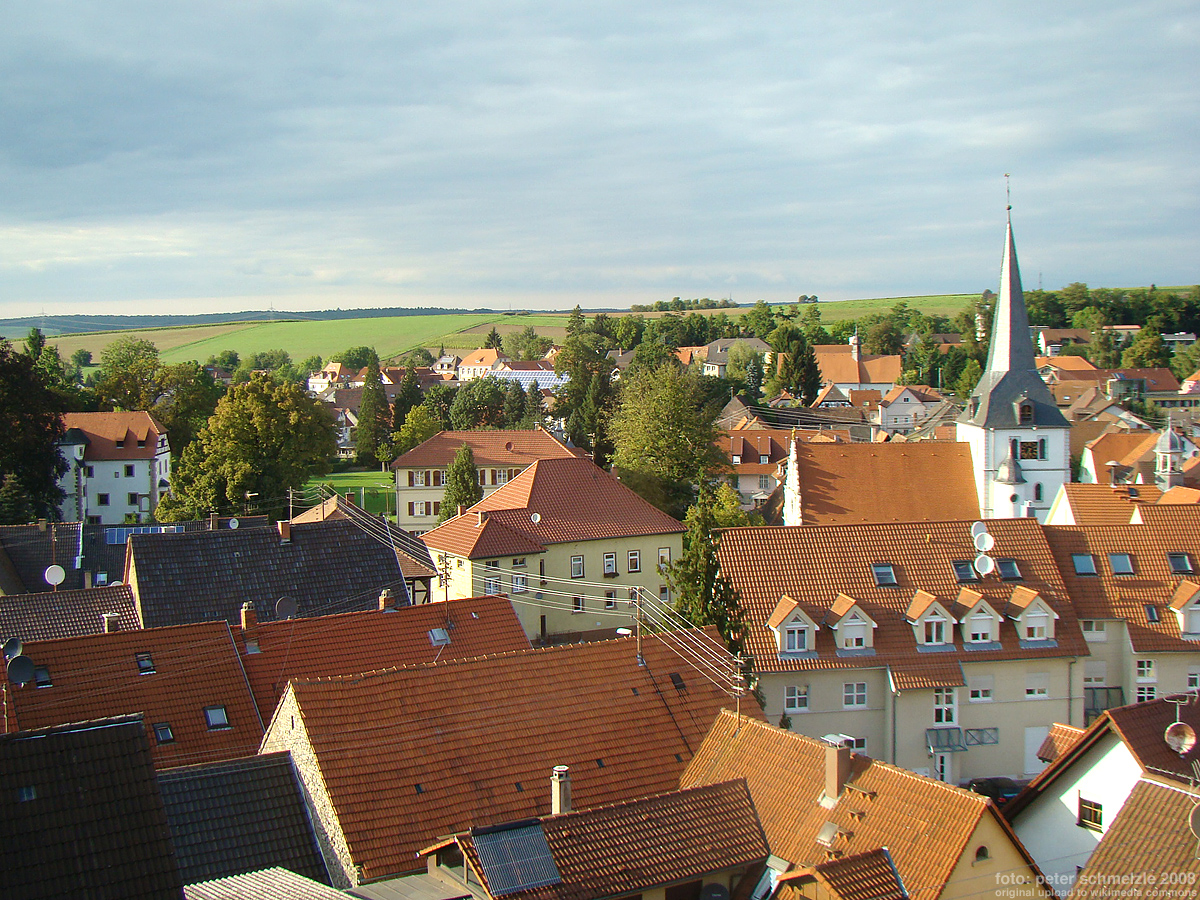
- Historic centre

- Coat of arms

- Location of Neckarbischofsheim within Rhein-Neckar-Kreis district
- Interactive map of Neckarbischofsheim
- Location within Germany Location within Baden-Württemberg
- Coordinates: 49°17′33″N 08°57′38″E
- Country: Germany
- State: Baden-Württemberg
- Admin. region: Karlsruhe
- District: Rhein-Neckar-Kreis

Government
  - Mayor (2020–28): Thomas Seidelmann

Area
  - Total: 26.41 km^{2} (10.20 sq mi)
- Elevation: 171 m (561 ft)

Population (2025-12-31)
  - Total: 4,205
  - Density: 159.2/km^{2} (412.4/sq mi)
- Time zone: UTC+01:00 (CET)
  - Summer (DST): UTC+02:00 (CEST)
- Postal codes: 74922–74924
- Dialling codes: 07263
- Vehicle registration: HD
- Website: www.neckarbischofsheim.de

Neckarbischofsheim (German pronunciation: [ˌnɛkaʁˈbɪʃɔfshaɪm]) is a town in the district of Rhein-Neckar-Kreis, in Baden-Württemberg, Germany. It is situated 8 km northeast of Sinsheim, and 24 km southeast of Heidelberg.

== Mayors ==
- 1949–1974: Albert Kumpf
- 1974–1990: Günter Burkhardt
- 1990–2004: Rolf Geinert (SPD)
- 2004–2012: Hans-Joachim Vogt
- 2012–2020: Tanja Grether
- Since 2020: Thomas Seidelmann

== Notable people ==
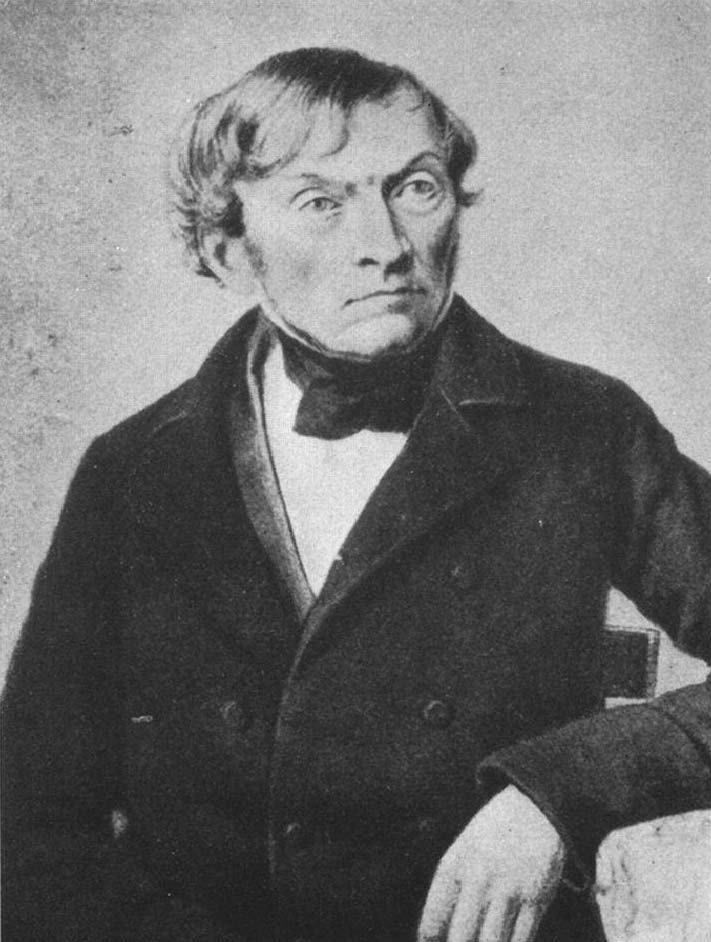
Karl Mayer

- Karl Mayer (1786–1870), jurist and poet
- Louis Mayer (painter) (1791–1843), landscape painter
- Axel Schock (born 1965), journalist and author
- Ludwig Jesselson (born 1910), philanthropist and businessman
