= Louis Mayer (painter) =

German painter

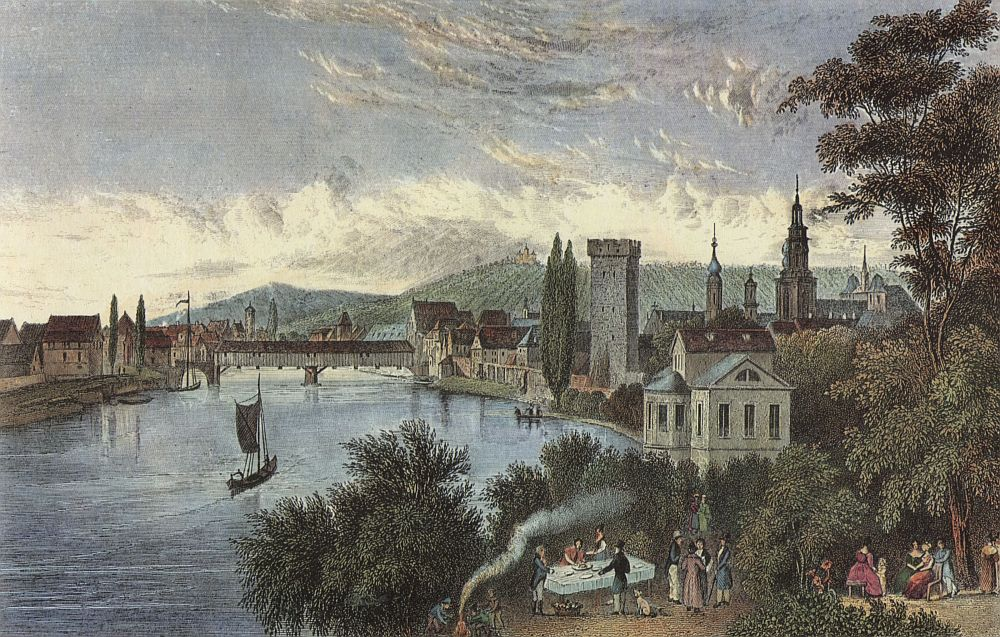
The shore of the Neckar in Heilbronn (c. 1840)

Louis Mayer (23 May 1791 in Neckarbischofsheim – 18 November 1843 in Stuttgart), born Ludwig Hartmann Mayer, was a German landscape painter and brother to the poet Karl Mayer.

He studied painting in Stuttgart as a pupil of Gottlob Friedrich Steinkopf (1779–1861). On his study travels, he visited Swabia, Switzerland, Tyrol, Styria and Italy.
