= Johann Friedrich Leybold =

German painter and engraver (1755-1838)

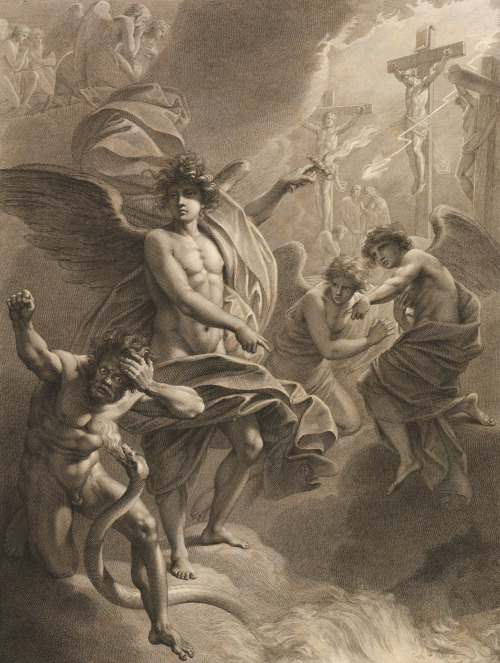
Klopstock's Messias, Canto 9, after Heinrich Füger

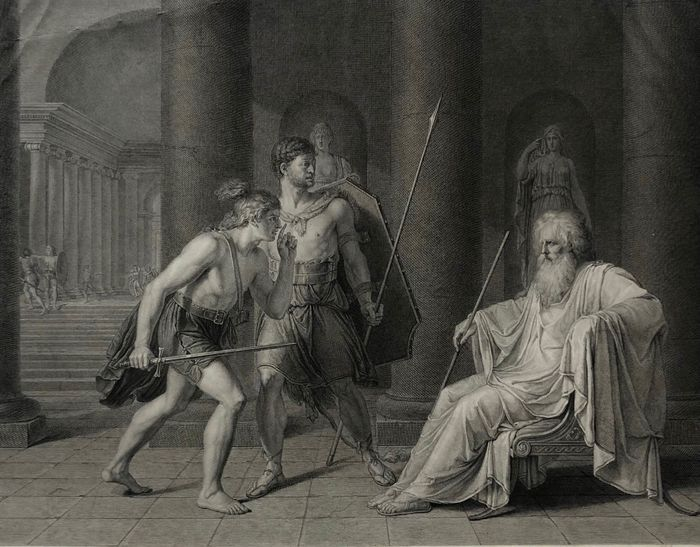
Death of the Consul Papirius, after Philipp Friedrich von Hetsch

Johann Friedrich Leybold (18 June 1755 – 13 November 1838) was a German miniaturist painter and copper engraver.

== Biography ==
Leybold was born on 18 June 1755 in Stuttgart. He was the son of a master baker. As a young employee of the porcelain factory in Ludwigsburg, his supervisors noticed his artistic skills and recommended that his father allow him to take drawing lessons. This was agreed to, and he began his studies with a local sculptor, then attended an art school in Stuttgart. After that, he and two other students were assigned to work with the court stucco maker, decorating Solitude Palace. In 1770, all three were accepted into the new military painting school. In 1773, the painting school expanded and became the Military Academy. The following year, a copper engraving school was added and Johann Gotthard von Müller was named its director. Leybold became his first student and, later, his assistant.

He was named the Court Engraver in 1781 so, rather than study abroad, he remained in Stuttgart. Despite this appointment, his main source of income appears to have been miniature portrait painting.

In 1789, he was given a professorship in drawing and modeling at the Hohe Karlsschule, an offshoot of the Military Academy. However, when Duke Charles Eugene died, in 1793, everyone who had been employed by him lost their jobs. Leybold was given promises that he would eventually be reinstated, but he never was. In 1797, he received an appointment as Court Engraver in Saxe-Coburg, but this produced little income, so he moved to Vienna in 1798.

Over the next five years, he once again supported himself and his family as a miniaturist. When his son, Karl, became old enough to help provide, he returned to engraving and completed several projects he had begun years before, including a "Death of Marc Antony", after a painting by Karl Kaspar Pitz, and a "Death of the Consul Papirius", after Philipp Friedrich von Hetsch. These works helped him make the acquaintance of Heinrich Füger, Director of the Belvedere Gallery, who commissioned him to provide several illustrations for Der Messias, by Friedrich Gottlieb Klopstock.

In 1812, following the death of Jacob Matthias Schmutzer, former director of the Copper Engraving Academy, Leybold became the Court Copper Engraver in Vienna. Shortly after, he was appointed a professor at the copper engraving school and became a member of the Academic Council.

Four of his sons also became artists: Karl Jakob Theodor, Edward Friedrich, Heinrich Gustav Adolf and Rudolf Moritz (1806–1857).

He died on 13 November 1838 in Vienna.

== Sources ==
- Biography, from the Biographisches Lexikon des Kaiserthums Oesterreich @ WikiSource
- August Wintterlin (1883). "Leybold, Johann Friedrich" . Allgemeine Deutsche Biographie (in German). Vol. 18. Leipzig: Duncker & Humblot. pp. 514–516.
- Schöny: "Leybold Johann Friedrich". In: Österreichisches Biographisches Lexikon 1815–1950 (ÖBL). Vol. 5, Austrian Academy of Sciences, Vienna 1972, p. 176.
