= Johann Friedrich Steinkopf (publisher) =

Johann Friedrich Steinkopf (17 May 1771, Ludwigsburg - 4 April 1852, Stuttgart) was a German bookseller and publisher.

== Life and career ==
He was the first of fourteen children born to the porcelain painter, Johann Friedrich Steinkopf. His mother was Katharina Barbara Betulius (1754–1816), daughter of the bookseller and publisher, Johann Christoph Betulius (1728–1791). His siblings included Carl Friedrich Adolf, an evangelical pastor, and Gottlob Friedrich, a landscape painter.

After his family returned to Stuttgart, in 1775, he lived in his grandfather's house. At the age of fourteen, he began helping him with his publishing business. After his grandfather's death, he took over the company, aged only twenty. In 1792 he renamed the firm: "Verlag J. F. Steinkopf", under which name the company is still doing business.

In 1799, he married Dorothea Morstatt, who died in 1800, giving birth to their son Friedrich (1800-1821). He remarried in 1801, to Julie Magdalene Wallot (1778-1857). They had only one child, who died as an infant.

In 1806, he acquired a printing shop from Karl Jakob Klett, whose family would later create the publishing company, Ernst Klett Verlag. He passed the bookselling branch of his company along to his brother Ferdinand (1787-1828), in 1815. After his early death, the store went to Johann's young nephew, Gustav Süskind (1809–1895). In 1840, the store and the publishing company were transferred to another nephew, Rudely Louis Hänel (1808–1847), who had been a partner since 1834. After his death, the publishing operations were taken over by Friedrich August Steinkopf (1824–1903), one of Ferdinand's sons.

He was awarded the Orden der Württembergischen Krone in 1842. He died, aged eighty, after a brief illness.

== Publishing program ==
He tended to focus his publishing efforts on works by pietistic authors, such as Johann Albrecht Bengel, Sixt Karl Kapff, Philipp Friedrich Hiller and Ludwig Hofacker. One of his most notable publications was the Tägliche Hand-Buch in guten und bösen Tagen (Daily Handbook for Good and Bad Days) by Johann Friedrich Starck, the first completely new edition of that book since 1738.

His first original publication, the Ökonomische Handbuch für Frauenzimmer (Economic Handbook for Housewives, 1792), was coupled with a cookbook by Friederike Luise Löffler (1744-1805), and became a best seller, which is still being republished.

Beginning in 1831, Johann Christian Friedrich Burk (1800-1880), published his Sunday paper Der Christenbote (Christian Messenger), through the Steinkopf company. It appeared until 1941, when it was banned by the Nazi government. From 1836, they also published the youth-oriented magazine, Jugendblätter, for the pietist pastor, Christian Gottlob Barth.

== Sources ==
- Waltraud Pfäfflin; Friedrich Pfäfflin: Die Gräber der Dichter auf dem Stuttgarter Hoppenlau-Friedhof. with an essay by Udo Dickenberger. Stuttgart : Edition Vincent Klink, 2015, pps.91–93, 364–365 ISBN 978-3-927350-54-0
- Rudolf Schmidt: Deutsche Buchhändler. Deutsche Buchdrucker. Beiträge zu einer Firmengeschichte des deutschen Buchgewerbes. Vol.5. Berlin : Verlag der Buchdruckerei Franz Weber, 1908, pps. 930–934 (Online)
- Stammbuch Karl Friedrich Adolf Steinkopf. 1795–1801 (Online)
- Aus der Chronik der Familie Steinkopf. Ein Gedenkblatt zum 1. August 1898. Stuttgart : J. F. Steinkopf, 1898
