= Johann Friedrich Steinkopf (painter) =

German painter

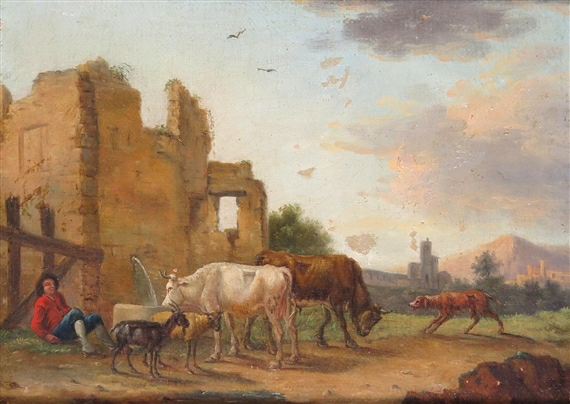
A Rustic with Livestock, by Some Ruins

Johann Friedrich Steinkopf (5 March 1737, Oppenheim - 30 January 1825, Stuttgart) was a German landscape, animal and porcelain painter.

== Biography ==
He was born to Carl Otto Steinkopf (1713-1779), a Master butcher, and his wife, Anna Elisabeth, née Finkenauer (died 1773), the daughter of a city attorney. At the age of fourteen, after completing his primary education, his father sent him to work at a grocery store in Mannheim, despite his expressed interest in studying classical art. The following year, one of his cousins fell ill, so he took his place; caring for over forty post horses.

In 1755, he went to work at a porcelain factory, newly established by Paul Hannong in Frankenthal, and soon became a skilled porcelain painter. In 1759, dissatisfaction with the way he was being treated prompted him to take a position at the porcelain factory in Ludwigsburg, which had been founded in 1758 under the direction of Charles Eugene, Duke of Württemberg. Numerous pieces from that period have been ascribed to him; mostly with equestrian battles and hunting scenes.

In 1770, he married Katharina Barbara Betulius (1754–1816), daughter of the publisher and bookbinder, Johann Christoph Betulius (1728–1791). The marriage produced fourteen children, including Johann Friedrich, who took over the publishing business, Carl Friedrich Adolf, an evangelical pastor, and Gottlob Friedrich, who also became a landscape painter. Eventually, his pay at the factory could not keep pace with his family's growth, so he returned to Stuttgart in 1775.

There, he supported his family by giving private drawing lessons and making copies of oil paintings by popular artists of Dutch origin; primarily Philips Wouwerman and Johann Heinrich Roos, both known for their scenes featuring animals. In 1786, he was offered a position as a drawing teacher at the Stuttgart gymnasium, which he accepted and held until his retirement in 1817. Duke, later King Frederick I of Württemberg, named him a court painter, in charge of animal painting, in 1801.

He died just over a month short of his 88th birthday. In his later life, he had amassed a large collection of drawings, engravings and paintings that were auctioned off a few months later. The sales catalog came to eighty pages.

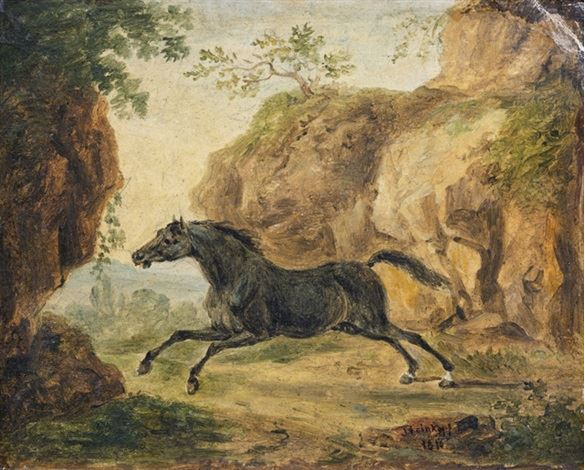
Runaway Rappe
