= Pfenning group (KMP Holding) =

German logistic group

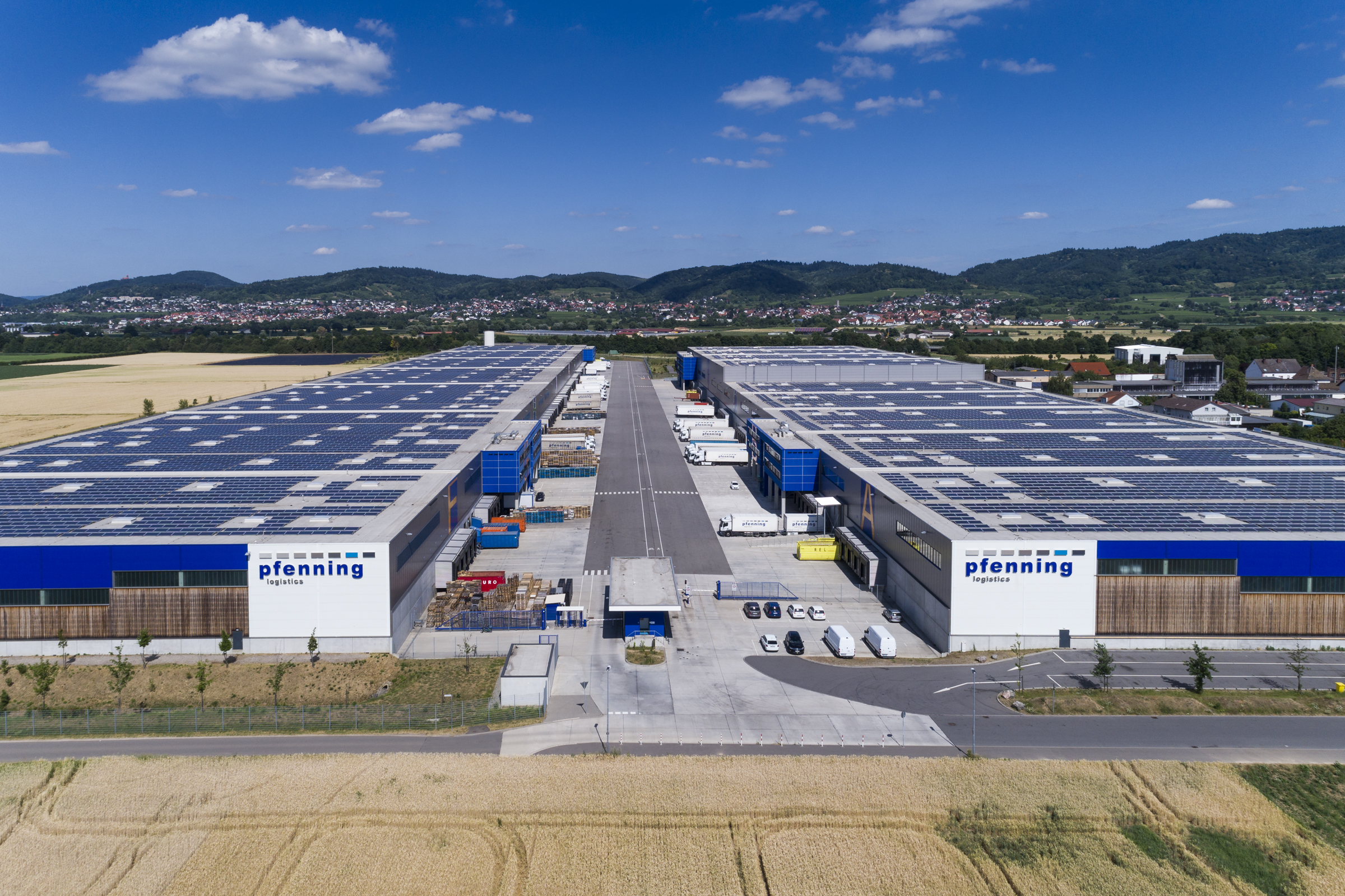
- Pfenning group headquarter Heddesheim
- Type: GmbH
- Industry: Logistics
- Founded: 1899
- Headquarters: Heddesheim, Germany
- Area served: worldwide
- Key people: Karl-Martin Pfenning, Manuel Pfenning, Rana Matthias Nag
- Revenue: 374.3 million euro (2022)
- Number of employees: 6,900
- Website: pfenning-logistics.com/en/

Pfenning group (KMP Holding), based in Heddesheim, Germany, is an international group specializing in supply chain and contract logistics for all industrial branches. The administrative umbrella is KMP Holding GmbH.

== History ==
=== Founding period ===
The origins go back to an entry in the "Trade Diary of the City of Viernheim" dated September 16, 1899. This entry documents the dairy business of Martin Faber, the grandfather of the current owner Karl-Martin Pfenning, and attests thus the existence of the company. The Pfenning company was actually founded in Viernheim after World War II came to an end. Faber's daughter Elisabeth, one of the first women in Germany with a truck driver's license who used to help her father in her early 20s, took over the main business of transporting milk together with her future husband, Johann Pfenning in the late 40s. When the National Socialists came to power and the Second World War began, Johann was conscripted. Between 1933 and 1944, three forced laborers were employed in the company.

=== After World War 2 ===
When Johann returns home from captivity as a prisoner of war, the company still has one vehicle. In the post-war period, Pfenning rebuilds the milk collection business. From the 1950s and 1960s, milk transportation provided a good income. New orders, such as deliveries of building materials, increase the radius of action and bring growth. In 1969, Pfenning receives the license for long-distance transport up to 150 km and in 1972 the permit for unlimited long-distance freight transport. One year later, external warehouses are rented for the first time. When Johann's son, Karl-Martin Pfenning, joins the company in 1970, he builds storage space for the first time. In 1978, Pfenning builds the first warehouse on behalf of a customer.

=== Germany's first logistics cooperation ===
When the logistics market fragmented into many small companies at the beginning of the 1980s, Pfenning decided to join forces with like-minded smaller forwarding companies. In the 1980s, he founded Logsped, the first logistics cooperation in Germany. There is a uniform logo, a joint market presence and a common new logistics concept with defined standards for the entire network. Logsped is able to serve major customers such as the Rewe Group, which took over 500 former consumer stores from the former East German combine after reunification in 1990.

=== Entry into contract logistics and foundation of KMP ===
The Logsped chapter ends in 1996. The company starts from zero. In Germany, the Logsped parts of the old Pfenning business are continued. After the founding of the contract and trade logistics company, the old Pfenning Spedition is bought back in 1997. In 1998, KMP (Karl Martin Pfenning) Holding GmbH was founded as an administrative umbrella[6] Pfenning expanded into Eastern Europe during this time. With the integration of the Berlin-based forwarding company Erck in 2005 and the entry into JIT plant supply in Bremen, the company successfully entered the automotive sector the following year. Acquisitions in the metal construction sector and the establishment of its own temporary employment agency expand the Group's range of services from 2010.

=== Move to Heddesheim ===
In 2012, the company built and relocated to the self-developed Multicube Rhein-Neckar logistics concept in Heddesheim. In 2018, the Multicube Rheinhessen in Monsheim was inaugurated. Germany-wide expansion began in 2019. By 2021, locations were also opened in Hungary, Sweden, Poland and France. In 2022, the third and fourth generation family business will employ 7,000 people at 110 locations, including 55 production sites, in Europe.

== Group structure ==
Pfenning Group is part of the KMP Holding GmbH. KMP is the holding company of several companies that serve as supply chain service providers for all manufacturing and retail industries. Other divisions of the company are logistics real estate development, personnel service providers, metal construction and car dealerships.
