= Volenice =

Velonice may refer to places in the Czech Republic:

- Volenice (Příbram District), a municipality and village in the Central Bohemian Region
- Volenice (Strakonice District), a municipality and village in the South Bohemian Region
- Volenice, a village and part of Počedělice in the Ústí nad Labem Region
