= Úherce =

Úherce may refer to places in the Czech Republic:

- Úherce (Louny District), a municipality and village in the Ústí nad Labem Region
- Úherce (Plzeň-North District), a municipality and village in the Plzeň Region
- Úherce, a village and part of Dobrovice in the Central Bohemian Region
