= Břvany =

- Municipality
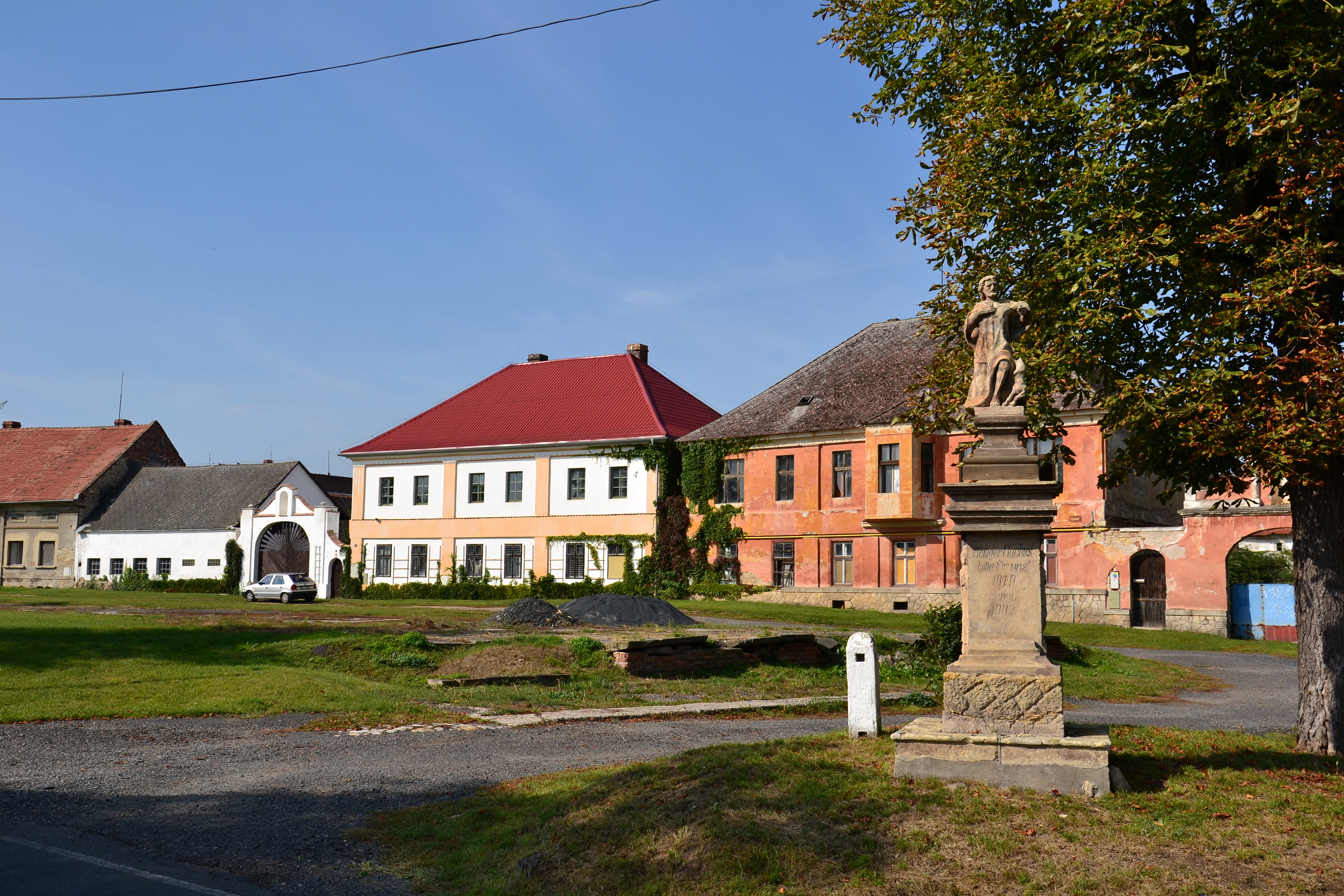
- Centre of Břvany

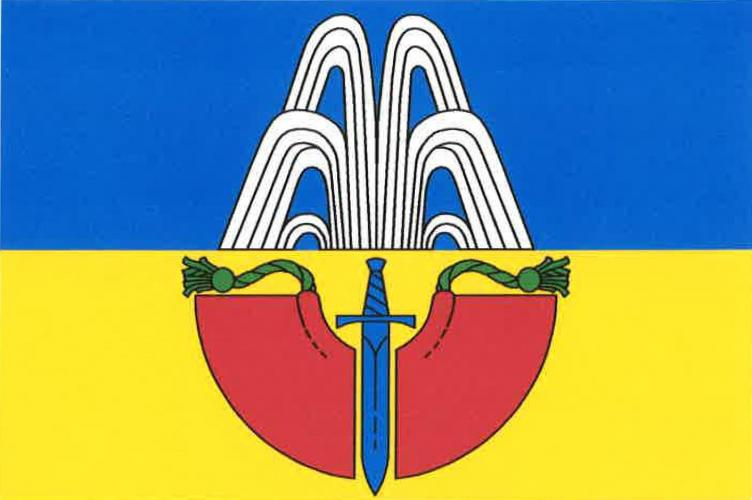
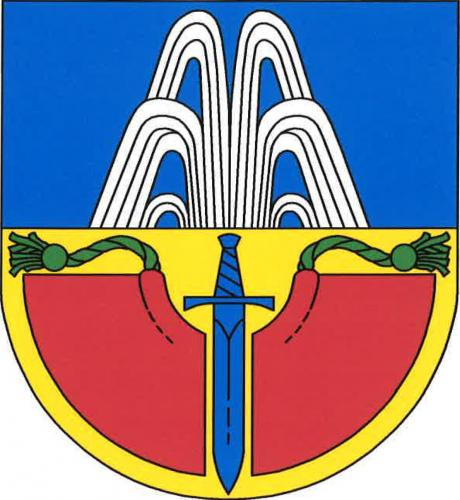
- Flag Coat of arms

- Location in the Czech Republic
- Coordinates: 50°24′4″N 13°43′18″E
- Country: Czech Republic
- Region: Ústí nad Labem
- District: Louny
- First mentioned: 1436

Area
  - Total: 9.38 km^{2} (3.62 sq mi)
- Elevation: 209 m (686 ft)

Population (2026-01-01)
  - Total: 330
  - Density: 35/km^{2} (91/sq mi)
- Time zone: UTC+1 (CET)
  - Summer (DST): UTC+2 (CEST)
- Postal code: 440 01
- Website: www.brvany.cz

Břvany (German: Weberschan) is a municipality and village in Louny District in the Ústí nad Labem Region of the Czech Republic. It has about 300 inhabitants.

Břvany lies approximately 8 kilometres (5 mi) north-west of Louny, 36 km (22 mi) south-west of Ústí nad Labem, and 61 km (38 mi) north-west of Prague.

== Demographics ==
Historical population
| Year | Pop. | ±% |
|---|---|---|
| 1869 | 377 | — |
| 1880 | 502 | +33.2% |
| 1890 | 511 | +1.8% |
| 1900 | 579 | +13.3% |
| 1910 | 538 | −7.1% |
| 1921 | 543 | +0.9% |
| 1930 | 695 | +28.0% |
| 1950 | 460 | −33.8% |
| 1961 | 462 | +0.4% |
| 1970 | 411 | −11.0% |
| 1980 | 361 | −12.2% |
| 1991 | 279 | −22.7% |
| 2001 | 311 | +11.5% |
| 2011 | 292 | −6.1% |
| 2021 | 304 | +4.1% |
Source: Censuses
