= Louny District =

Louny District Okres Louny
- District
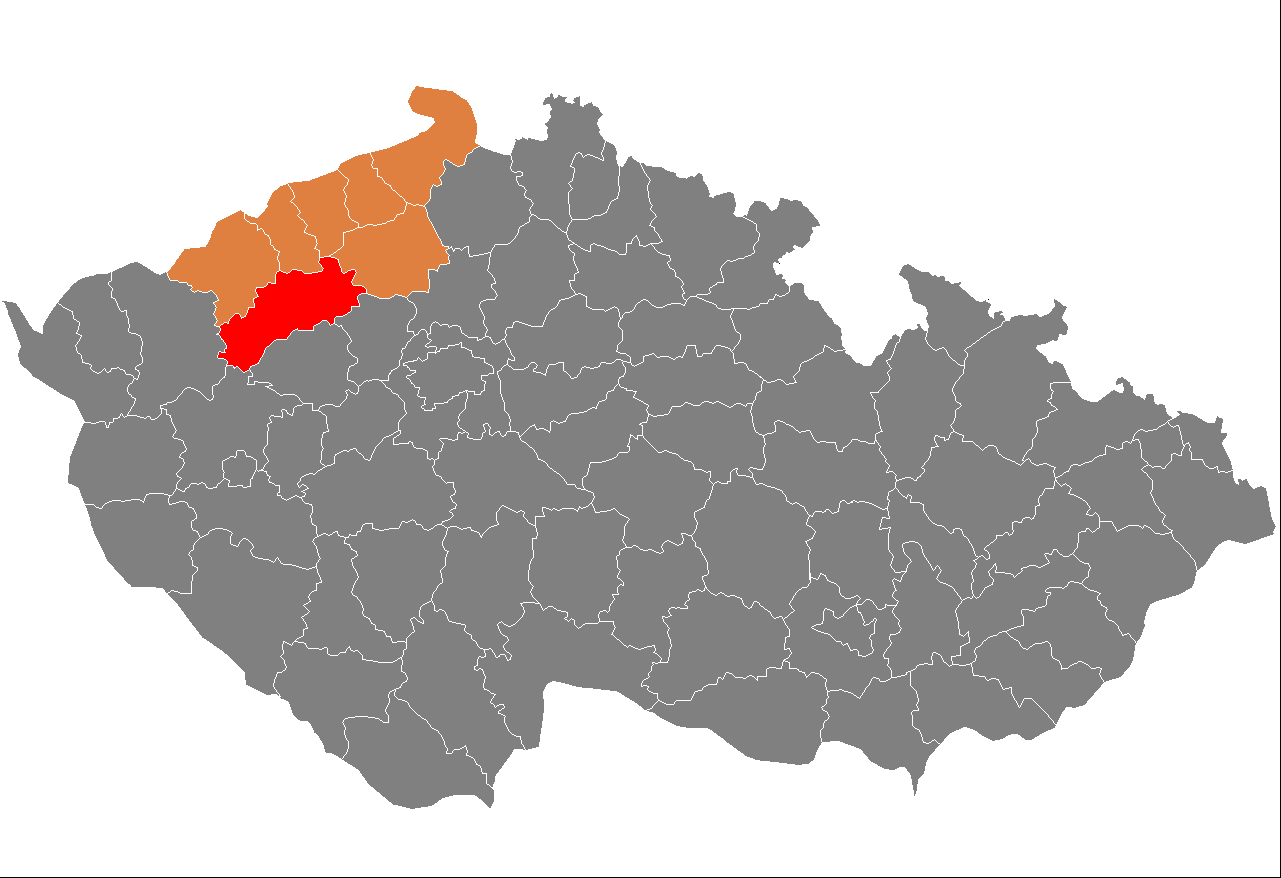
- Location in the Ústí nad Labem Region within the Czech Republic

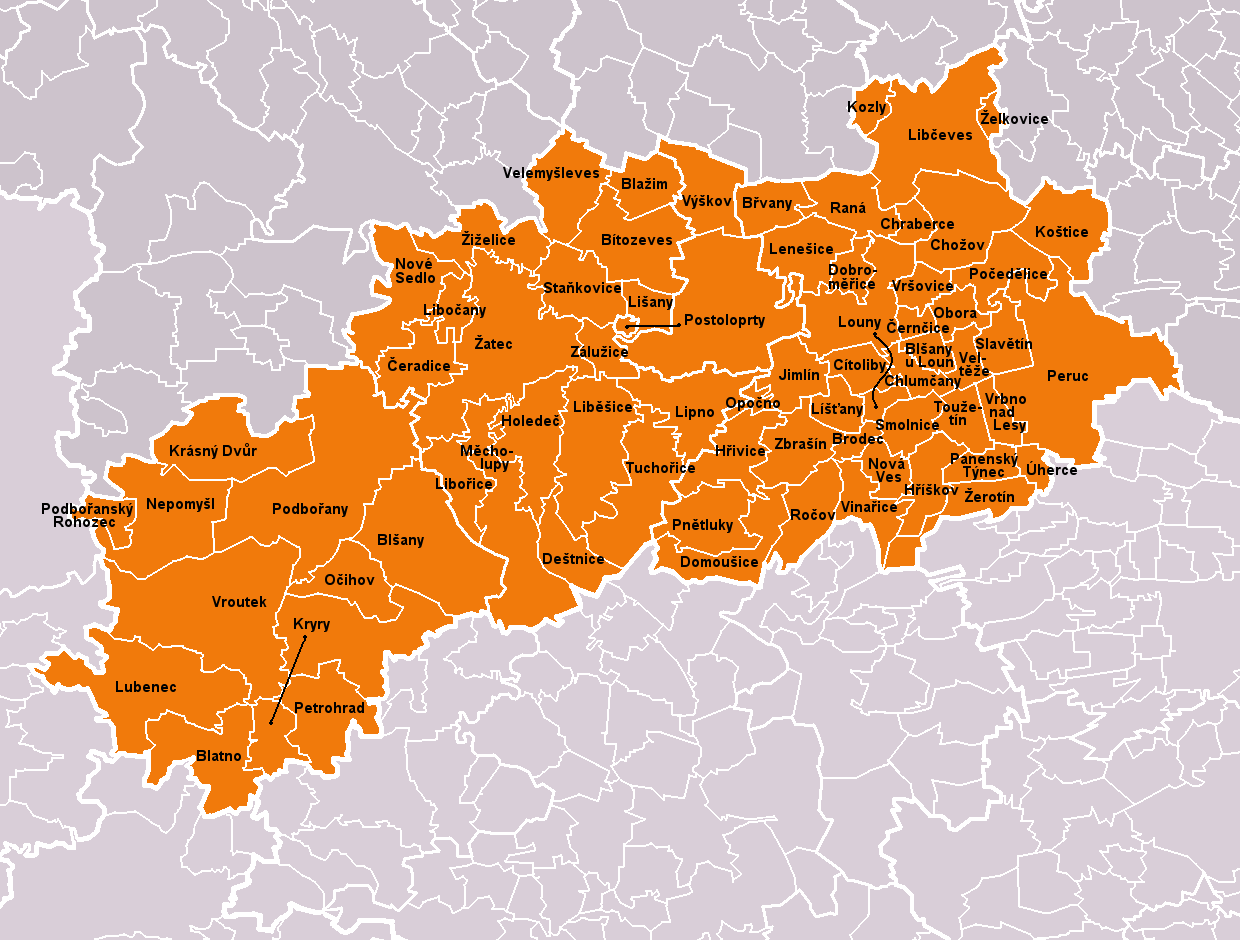
- Coordinates: 50°19′N 13°37′E
- Country: Czech Republic
- Region: Ústí nad Labem
- Capital: Louny

Area
  - Total: 1,120.97 km^{2} (432.81 sq mi)

Population (2026)
  - Total: 86,840
  - Density: 77.47/km^{2} (200.6/sq mi)
- Time zone: UTC+1 (CET)
  - Summer (DST): UTC+2 (CEST)
- Municipalities: 70
- * Towns: 7
- * Market towns: 7

Louny District (Czech: okres Louny) is a district in the Ústí nad Labem Region of the Czech Republic. Its capital is the town of Louny, but the most populous town is Žatec.

== Administrative division ==
Louny District is divided into three administrative districts of municipalities with extended competence: Louny, Podbořany and Žatec.

=== List of municipalities ===
Towns are marked in bold and market towns in italics:

Bitozeves - Blatno - Blažim - Blšany - Blšany u Loun - Brodec - Břvany - Cítoliby - Čeradice - Černčice - Chlumčany - Chožov - Chraberce - Deštnice - Dobroměřice - Domoušice - Holedeč - Hříškov - Hřivice - Jimlín - Koštice - Kozly - Krásný Dvůr - Kryry - Lenešice - Libčeves - Liběšice - Libočany - Libořice - Lipno - Lišany - Líšťany - Louny - Lubenec - Měcholupy - Nepomyšl - Nová Ves - Nové Sedlo - Obora - Očihov - Opočno - Panenský Týnec - Peruc - Petrohrad - Pnětluky - Počedělice - Podbořanský Rohozec - Podbořany - Postoloprty - Raná - Ročov - Slavětín - Smolnice - Staňkovice - Toužetín - Tuchořice - Úherce - Velemyšleves - Veltěže - Vinařice - Vrbno nad Lesy - Vroutek - Vršovice - Výškov - Zálužice - Žatec - Zbrašín - Želkovice - Žerotín - Žiželice

== Geography ==
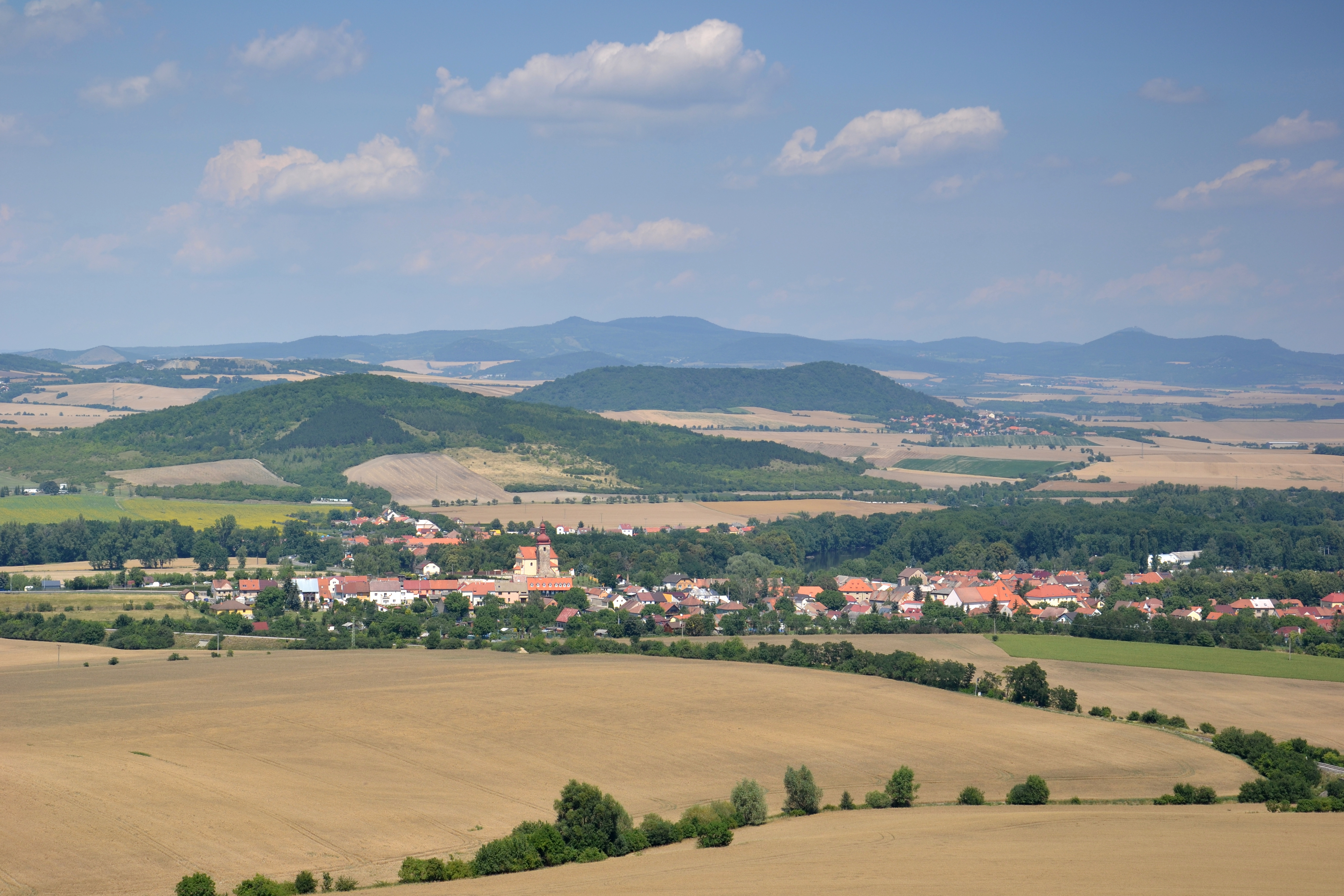
Landscape east of Louny

Most of the territory is flat and has an agricultural character, only the south and northeast are hilly. The territory is located in the rain shadow of the Ore Mountains and therefore belongs to the driest regions of the country. The territory extends into five geomorphological mesoregions: Most Basin (north and centre), Rakovník Uplands (southwest), Džbán (south), Lower Ohře Table (east) and Central Bohemian Uplands (northeast). The highest point of the district is a contour line on the slopes of the hill Ostrý in Libčeves with an elevation of 609 m (1,998 ft); the highest peak is Velký les in Blatno with an elevation of 592 m (1,942 ft). The lowest point is the river bed of the Ohře in Koštice at 165 m (541 ft).

From the total district area of 1,121.0 km^{2} (432.8 sq mi), agricultural land occupies 788.4 km^{2} (304.4 sq mi), forests occupy 180.5 km^{2} (69.7 sq mi), and water area occupies 15.6 km^{2} (6.0 sq mi). Forests cover 16.1% of the district's area.

The most important river is the Ohře, which drains almost the entire territory. Its most important tributaries are the Blšanka and Chomutovka. The largest body of water is fishpond Lenešický rybník. However, there are only a few bodies of water.

České středohoří is a protected landscape area that extends into the district.

== Demographics ==
Historical population

Year	Pop.	±%
1869	90,160	—
1880	101,961	+13.1%
1890	106,967	+4.9%
1900	120,215	+12.4%
1910	124,632	+3.7%

Year	Pop.	±%
1921	122,225	−1.9%
1930	127,368	+4.2%
1950	86,607	−32.0%
1961	88,064	+1.7%
1970	85,853	−2.5%

Year	Pop.	±%
1980	88,472	+3.1%
1991	86,640	−2.1%
2001	86,039	−0.7%
2011	85,213	−1.0%
2021	84,956	−0.3%

Source: Censuses

=== Most populous municipalities ===
Name	Population	Area (km^{2})
Žatec	18,984	43
Louny	18,061	24
Podbořany	6,254	60
Postoloprty	4,661	46
Peruc	2,374	53
Kryry	2,355	39
Vroutek	1,860	53
Lenešice	1,406	14
Dobroměřice	1,395	5
Lubenec	1,318	37

== Economy ==
The largest employers with headquarters in Louny District and at least 500 employees are:

Economic entity	Location	Number of employees	Main activity
Nexen Tire Europe	Bitozeves	1,000–1,499	Manufacture of tires
Koito Czech	Žatec	1,000–1,499	Manufacture of headlights
Yanfeng International Automotive Technology Czechia	Bitozeves	500–999	Automotive industry
Aisan Industry Czech	Louny	500–999	Automotive industry
Gestamp Louny	Velemyšleves	500–999	Automotive industry

Žatec and its surroundings is known for its tradition of growing Saaz hops. It is a protected designation of origin.

== Transport ==
The D7 motorway from Prague to Chomutov, including the unfinished section, leads across the district. The D6 motorway from Prague to Karlovy Vary passes through the southern part of the district.

== Sights ==
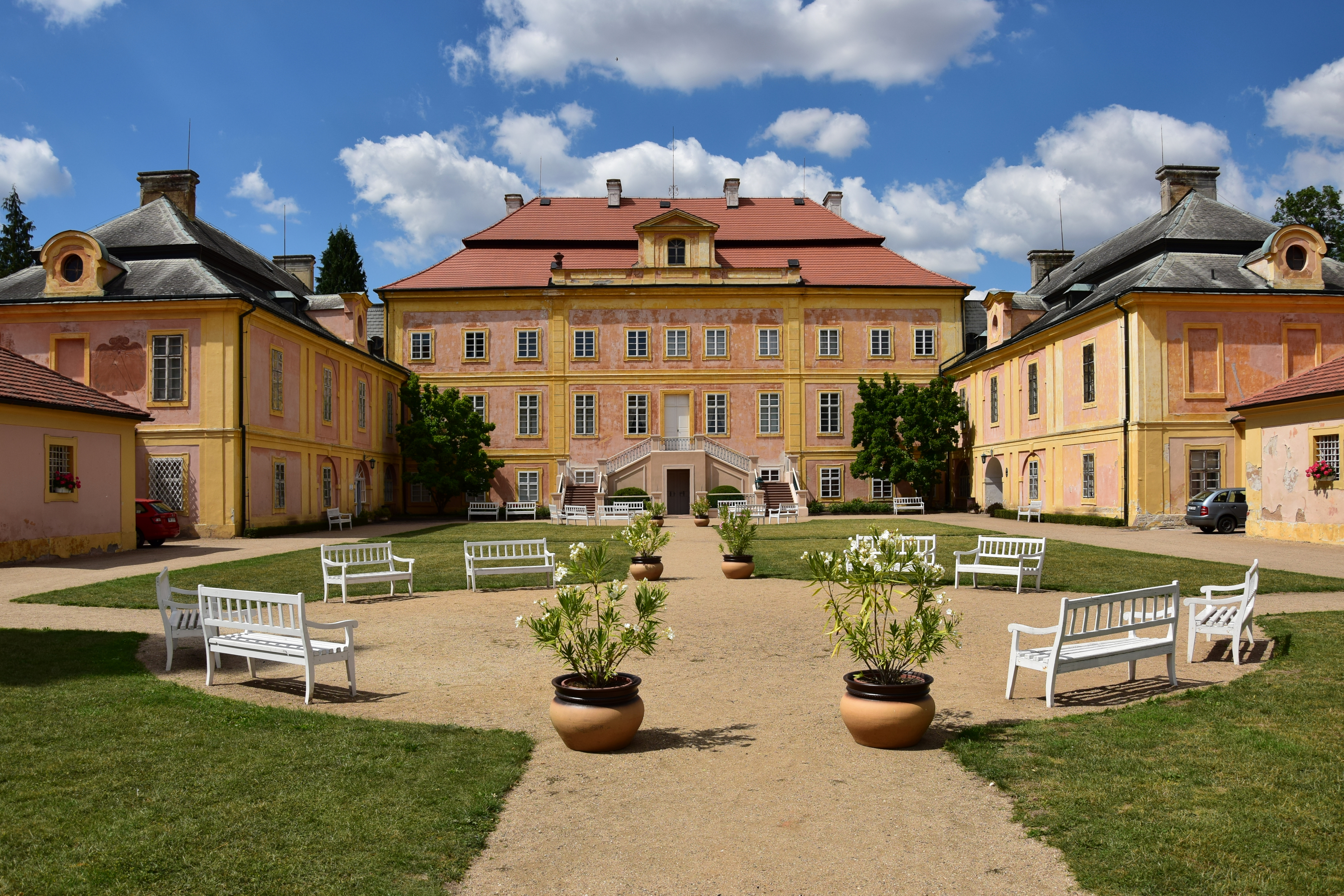
Krásný Dvůr Castle

Žatec and the landscape of Saaz hops was designated a UNESCO World Heritage Site in 2023 because it is an example of a monoculture agricultural landscape and long cultural tradition of growing and processing a renowned hops variety.

The most important monuments in the district, protected as national cultural monuments, are:

- Church of Saint Nicholas in Louny
- Krásný Dvůr Castle

The best-preserved settlements and landscapes, protected as monument reservations and monument zones, are:

- Žatec (includes both a monument reservation and a monument zone)
- Louny
- Soběchleby
- Stekník
- Žatec hops landscape

The most visited tourist destination is the Stekník Castle.
