= Chraberce =

- Municipality
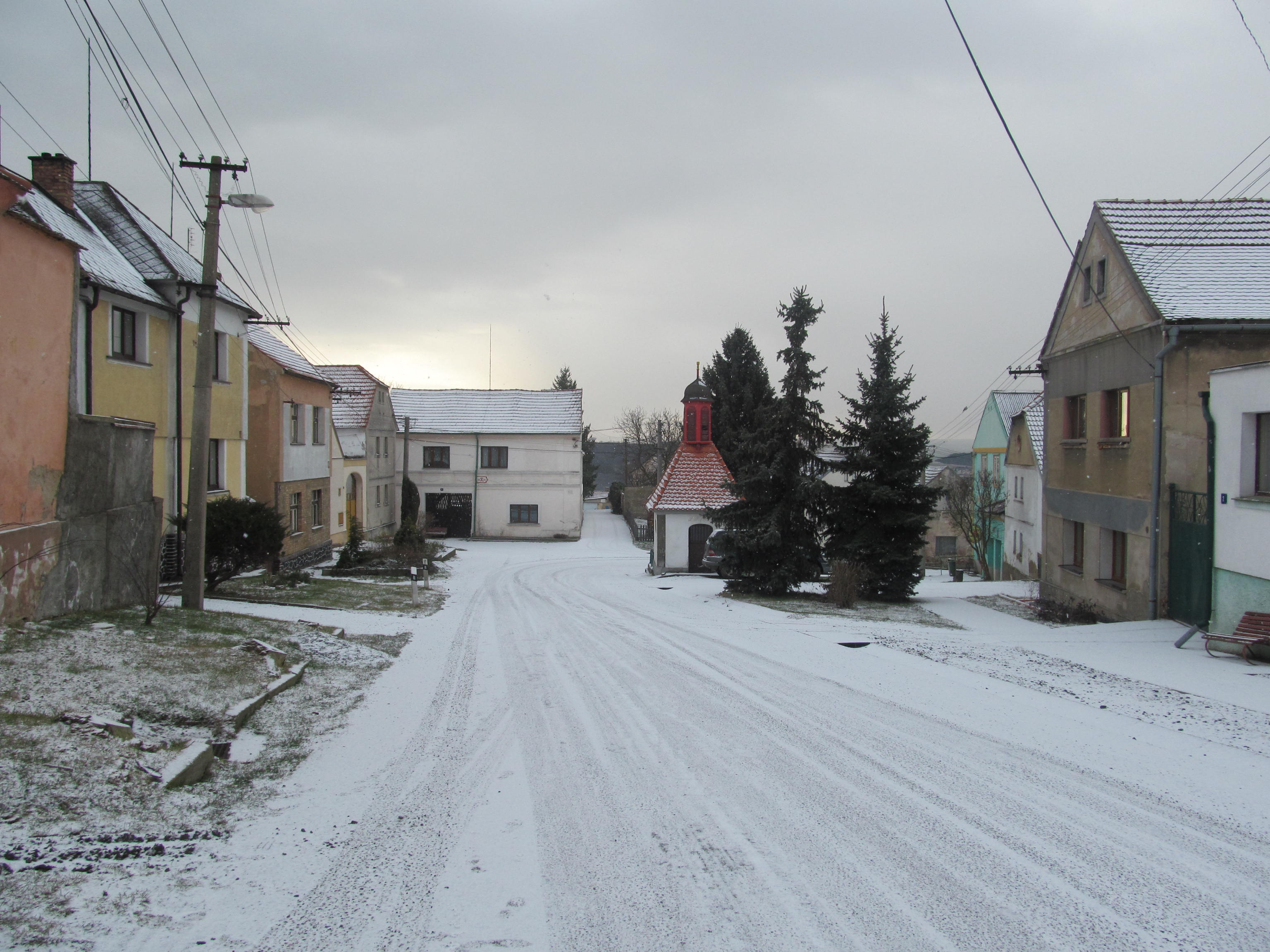
- Centre of Chraberce

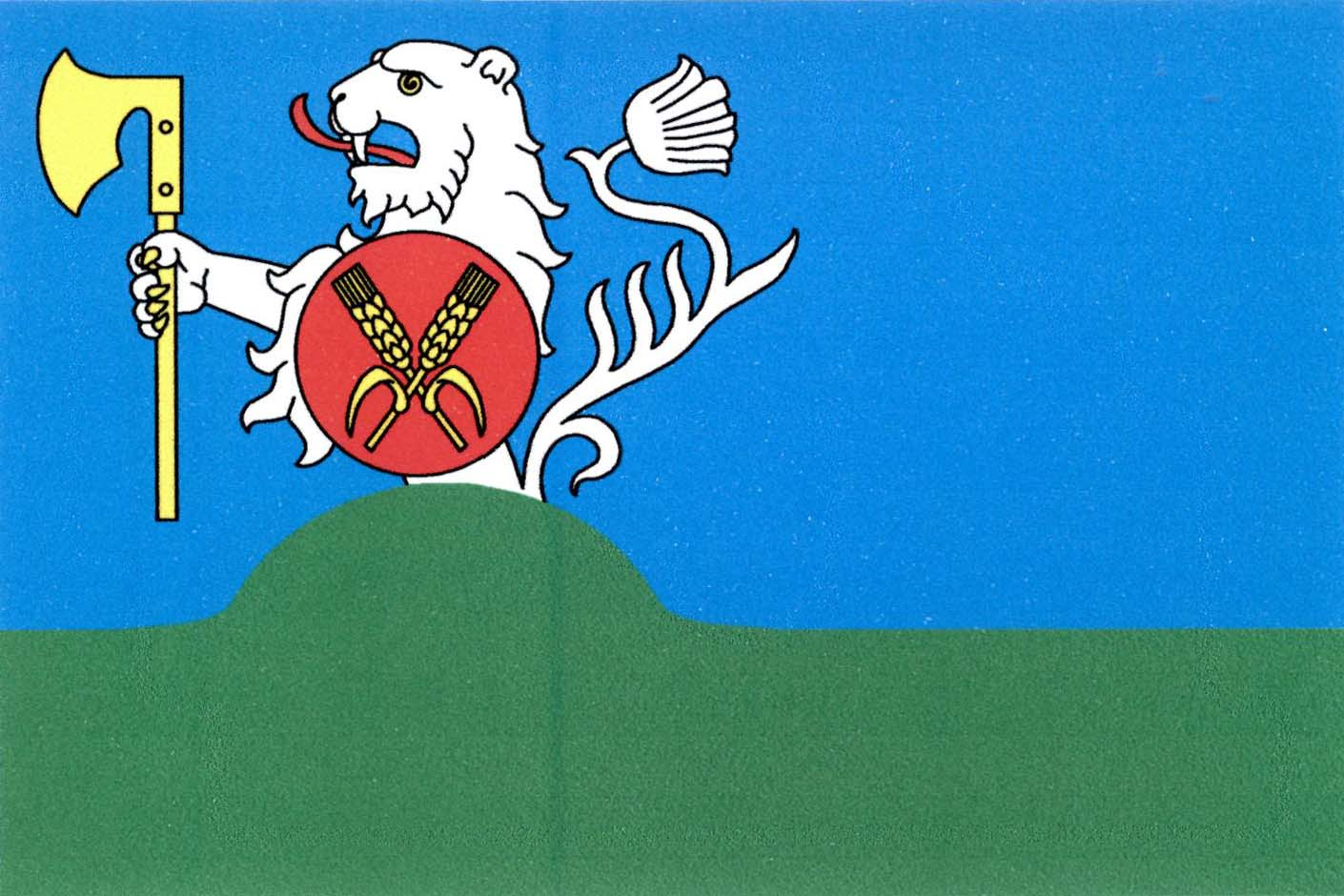
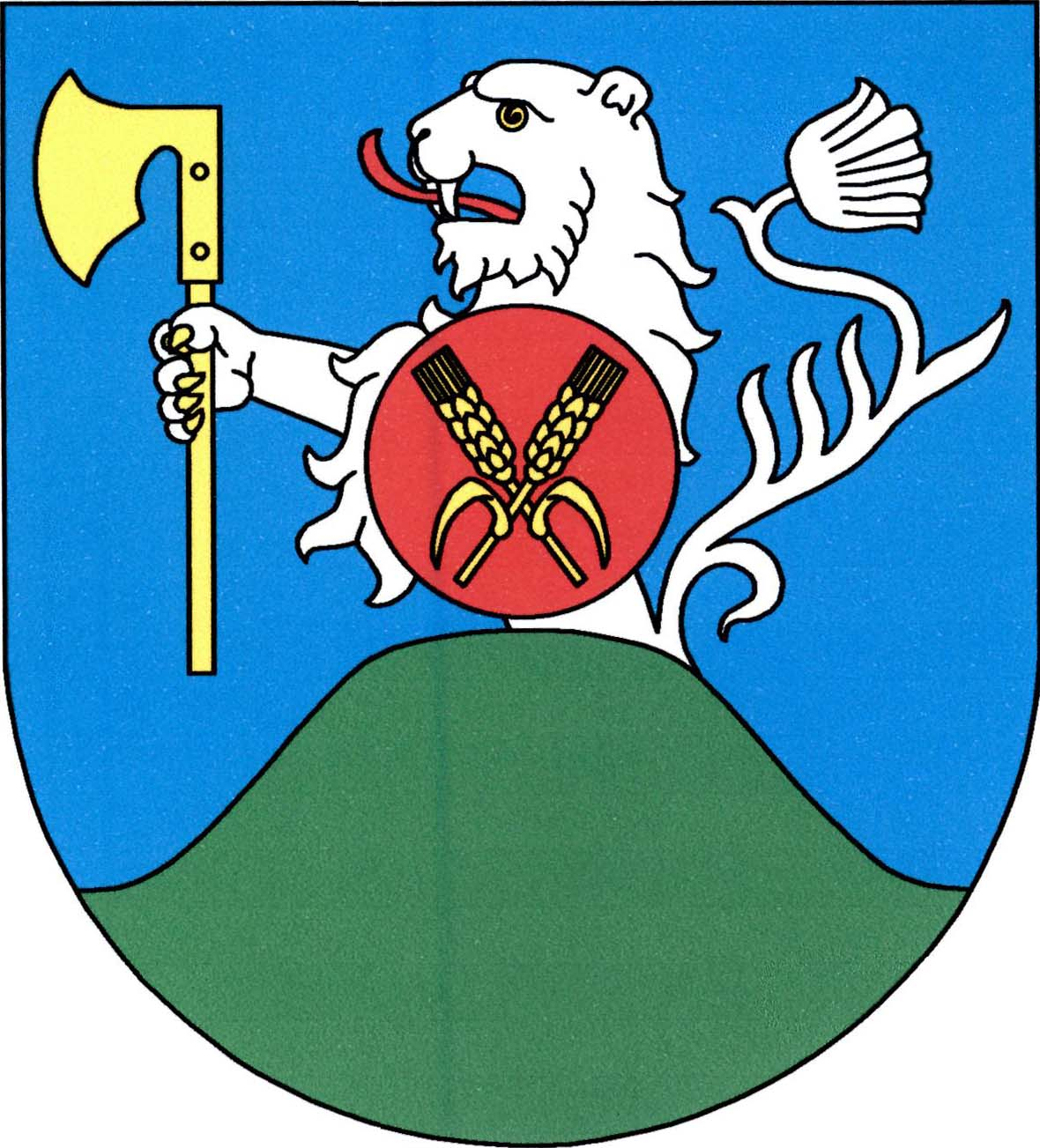
- Flag Coat of arms

- Location in the Czech Republic
- Coordinates: 50°24′30″N 13°49′47″E
- Country: Czech Republic
- Region: Ústí nad Labem
- District: Louny
- First mentioned: 1100

Area
  - Total: 3.68 km^{2} (1.42 sq mi)
- Elevation: 280 m (920 ft)

Population (2026-01-01)
  - Total: 125
  - Density: 34.0/km^{2} (88.0/sq mi)
- Time zone: UTC+1 (CET)
  - Summer (DST): UTC+2 (CEST)
- Postal code: 440 01
- Website: www.obec-chraberce.cz

Chraberce is a municipality and village in Louny District in the Ústí nad Labem Region of the Czech Republic. It has about 100 inhabitants.

Chraberce lies approximately 7 kilometres (4 mi) north of Louny, 32 km (20 mi) south-west of Ústí nad Labem, and 56 km (35 mi) north-west of Prague.

== Demographics ==
Historical population
Year	Pop.	±%
1869	187	—
1880	210	+12.3%
1890	201	−4.3%
1900	274	+36.3%
1910	267	−2.6%
1921	287	+7.5%
1930	319	+11.1%
1950	210	−34.2%
1961	216	+2.9%
1970	214	−0.9%
1980	190	−11.2%
1991	149	−21.6%
2001	139	−6.7%
2011	145	+4.3%
2021	123	−15.2%
Source: Censuses
