= Deštnice =

- Municipality
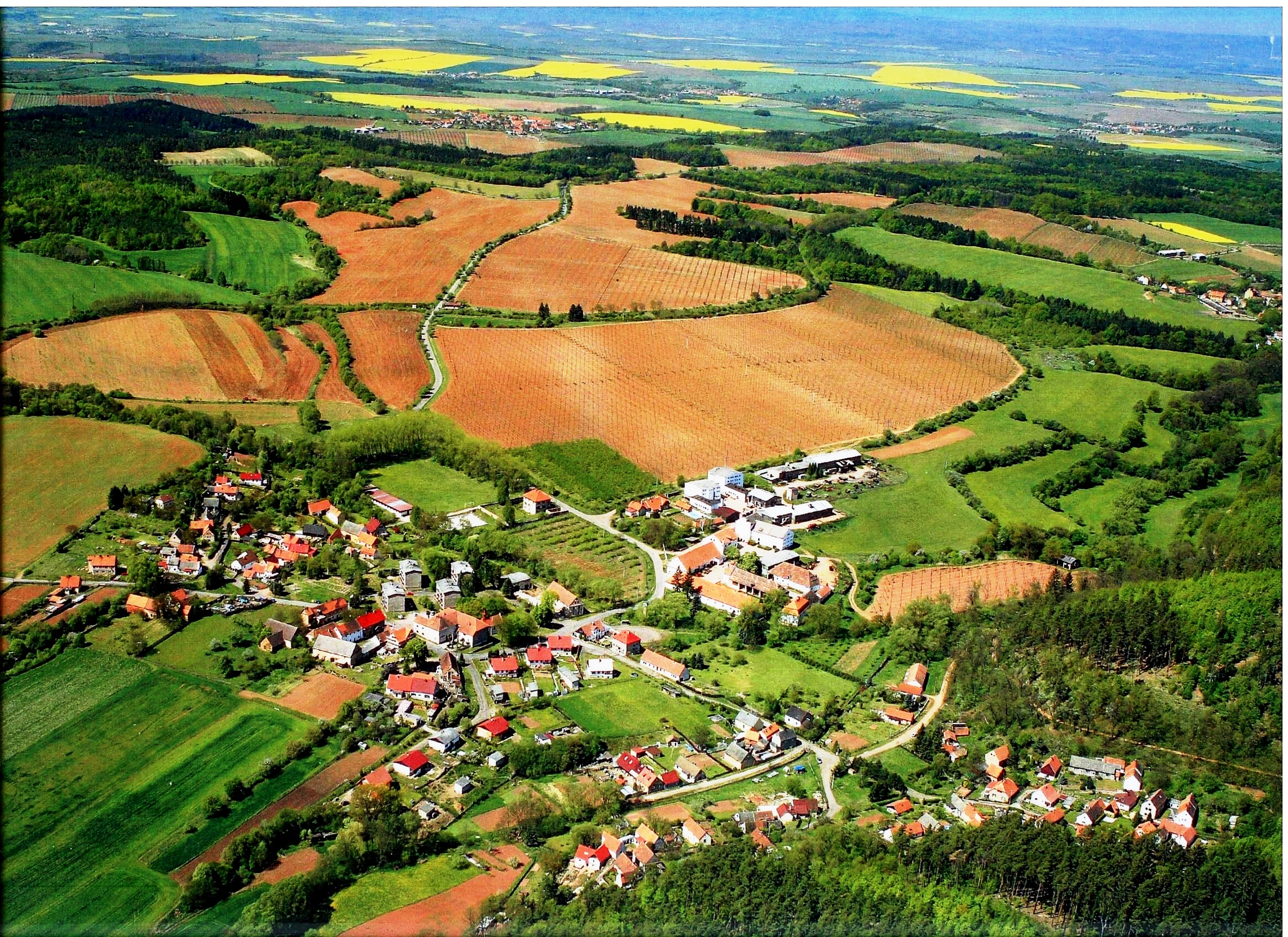
- Aerial view

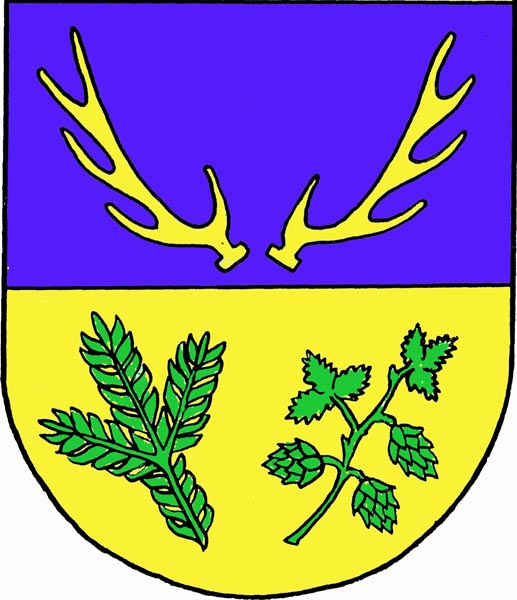
- Flag Coat of arms

- Location in the Czech Republic
- Coordinates: 50°13′51″N 13°36′36″E
- Country: Czech Republic
- Region: Ústí nad Labem
- District: Louny
- First mentioned: 1368

Area
  - Total: 10.74 km^{2} (4.15 sq mi)
- Elevation: 346 m (1,135 ft)

Population (2026-01-01)
  - Total: 254
  - Density: 23.6/km^{2} (61.3/sq mi)
- Time zone: UTC+1 (CET)
  - Summer (DST): UTC+2 (CEST)
- Postal code: 438 01
- Website: www.destnice.cz

Deštnice (German: Teschnitz) is a municipality and village in Louny District in the Ústí nad Labem Region of the Czech Republic. It has about 300 inhabitants.

Deštnice lies approximately 20 kilometres (12 mi) south-west of Louny, 57 km (35 mi) south-west of Ústí nad Labem, and 60 km (37 mi) west of Prague.

== Administrative division ==
Deštnice consists of two municipal parts (in brackets population according to the 2021 census):

- Deštnice (168)
- Sádek (34)

== Demographics ==
Historical population
Year	Pop.	±%
1869	858	—
1880	766	−10.7%
1890	772	+0.8%
1900	757	−1.9%
1910	778	+2.8%
1921	788	+1.3%
1930	838	+6.3%
1950	485	−42.1%
1961	455	−6.2%
1970	371	−18.5%
1980	259	−30.2%
1991	201	−22.4%
2001	188	−6.5%
2011	165	−12.2%
2021	202	+22.4%
Source: Censuses
