= Dobroměřice =

- Municipality
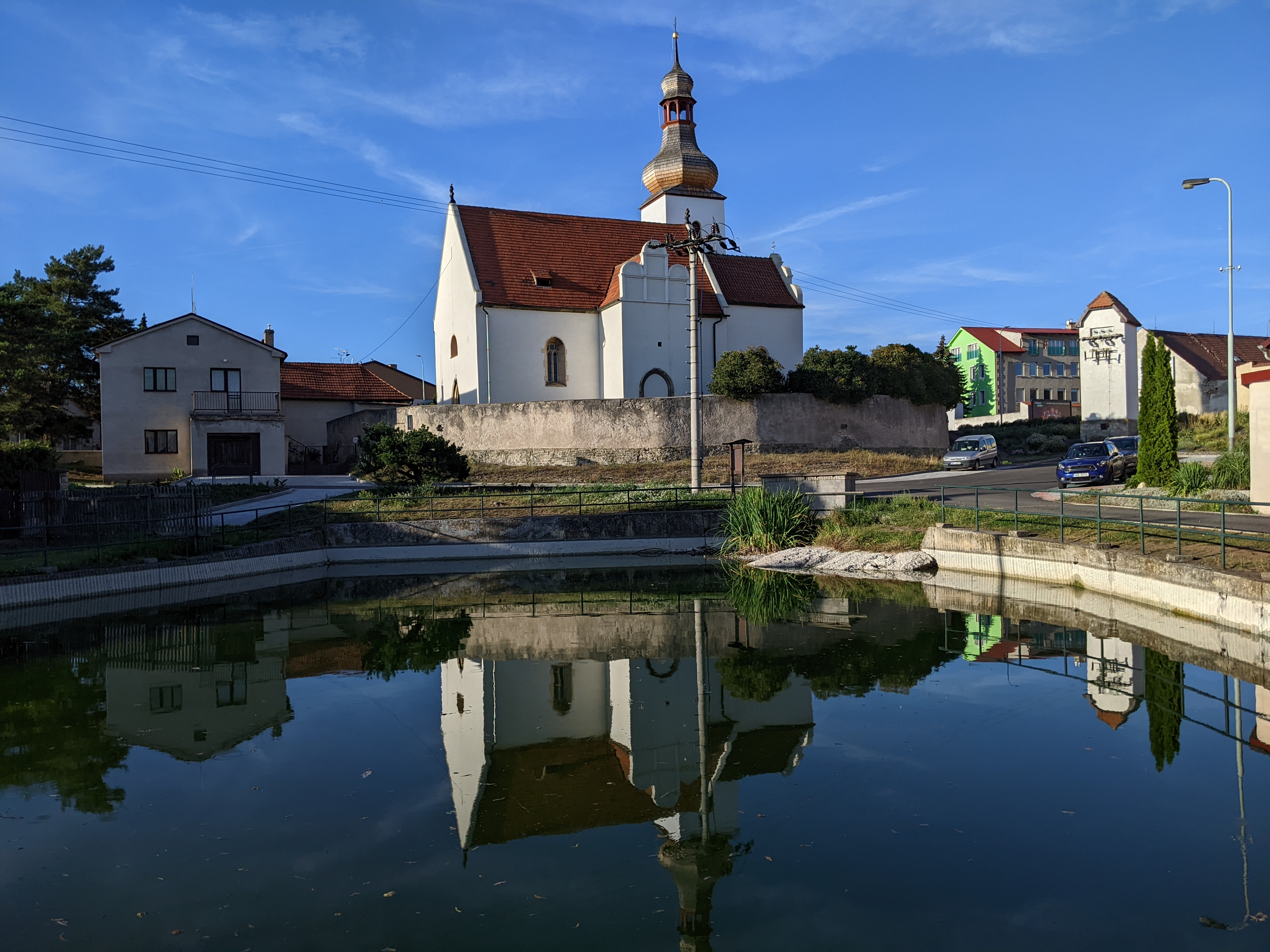
- Church of Saint Matthew

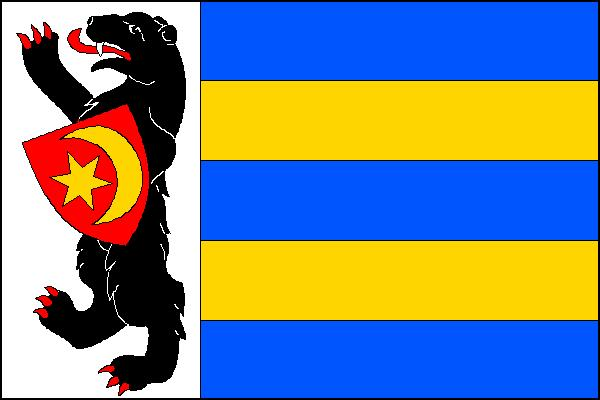
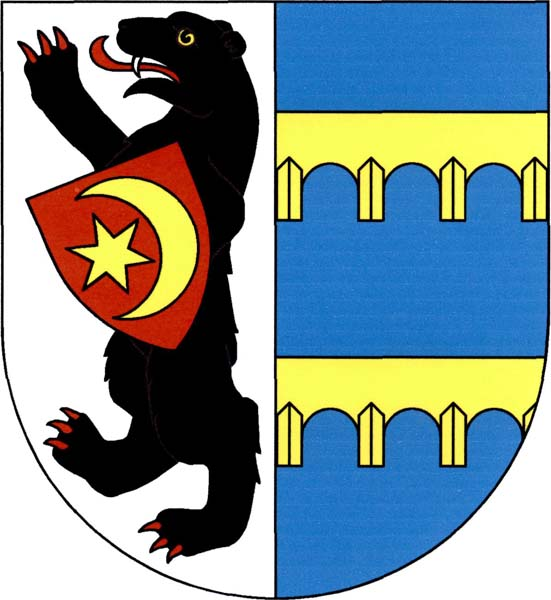
- Flag Coat of arms

- Location in the Czech Republic
- Coordinates: 50°22′13″N 13°47′41″E
- Country: Czech Republic
- Region: Ústí nad Labem
- District: Louny
- First mentioned: 1219

Area
  - Total: 4.85 km^{2} (1.87 sq mi)
- Elevation: 185 m (607 ft)

Population (2026-01-01)
  - Total: 1,395
  - Density: 288/km^{2} (745/sq mi)
- Time zone: UTC+1 (CET)
  - Summer (DST): UTC+2 (CEST)
- Postal code: 440 01
- Website: www.dobromerice.cz

Dobroměřice is a municipality and village in Louny District in the Ústí nad Labem Region of the Czech Republic. It has about 1,400 inhabitants.

Dobroměřice lies approximately 3 kilometres (2 mi) north of Louny, 37 km (23 mi) southwest of Ústí nad Labem, and 56 km (35 mi) northwest of Prague.

== Demographics ==
Historical population
Year	Pop.	±%
1869	305	—
1880	497	+63.0%
1890	579	+16.5%
1900	814	+40.6%
1910	812	−0.2%
1921	841	+3.6%
1930	1,230	+46.3%
1950	1,020	−17.1%
1961	1,003	−1.7%
1970	957	−4.6%
1980	1,133	+18.4%
1991	1,269	+12.0%
2001	1,292	+1.8%
2011	1,377	+6.6%
2021	1,388	+0.8%
Source: Censuses
