= Brodec (Louny District) =

- Municipality
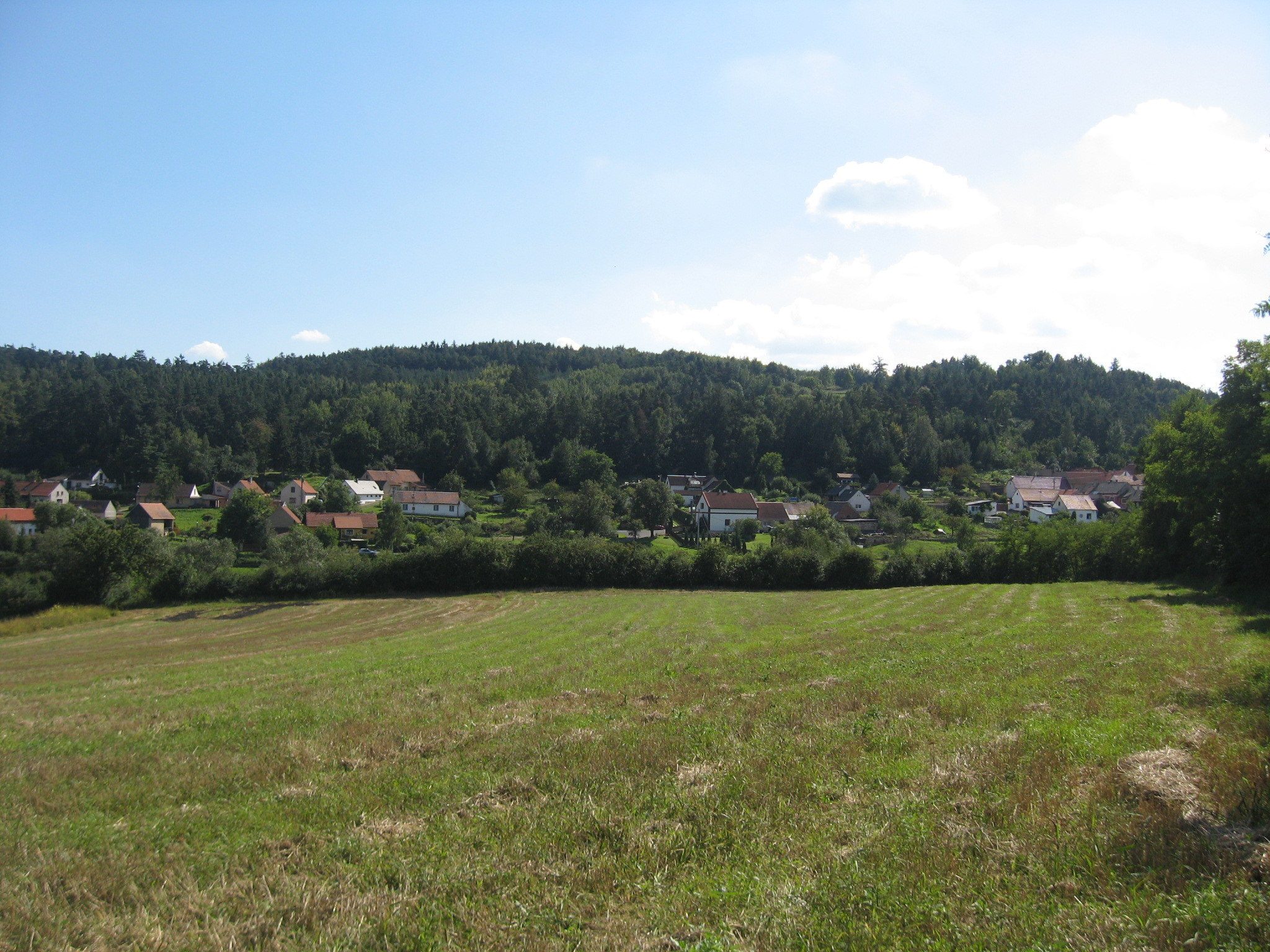
- View from the north

- Location in the Czech Republic
- Coordinates: 50°17′42″N 13°48′6″E
- Country: Czech Republic
- Region: Ústí nad Labem
- District: Louny
- First mentioned: 1373

Area
  - Total: 2.85 km^{2} (1.10 sq mi)
- Elevation: 285 m (935 ft)

Population (2026-01-01)
  - Total: 92
  - Density: 32/km^{2} (84/sq mi)
- Time zone: UTC+1 (CET)
  - Summer (DST): UTC+2 (CEST)
- Postal code: 440 01
- Website: www.obec-brodec.cz

Brodec is a municipality and village in Louny District in the Ústí nad Labem Region of the Czech Republic. It has about 90 inhabitants.

Brodec lies approximately 7 kilometres (4 mi) south of Louny, 44 km (27 mi) south of Ústí nad Labem, and 50 km (31 mi) north-west of Prague.

== Demographics ==
Historical population
Year	Pop.	±%
1869	322	—
1880	306	−5.0%
1890	317	+3.6%
1900	323	+1.9%
1910	322	−0.3%
1921	342	+6.2%
1930	303	−11.4%
1950	188	−38.0%
1961	157	−16.5%
1970	125	−20.4%
1980	92	−26.4%
1991	69	−25.0%
2001	66	−4.3%
2011	80	+21.2%
2021	78	−2.5%
Source: Censuses
