= Smolnice =

- Municipality
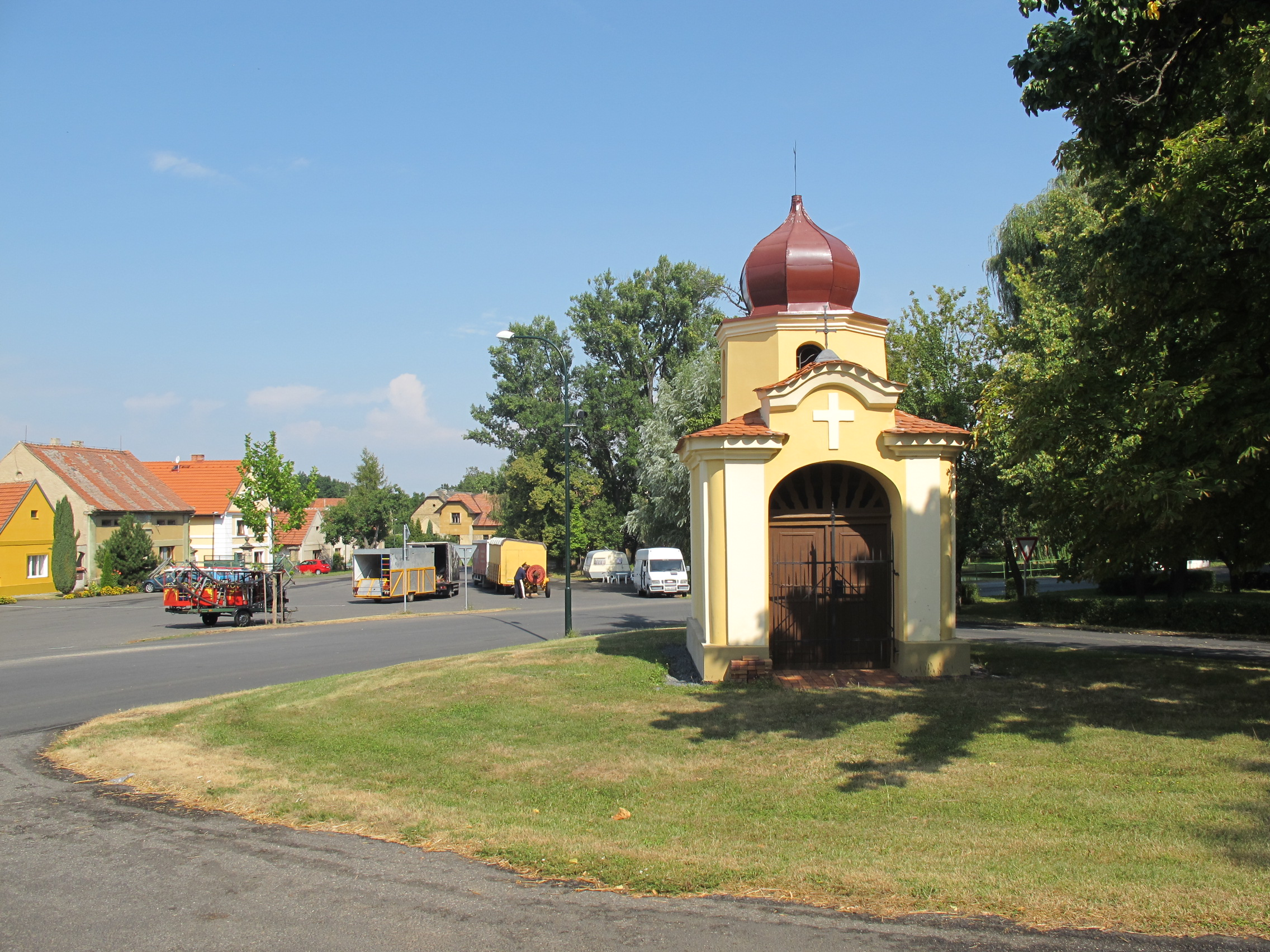
- Centre of Smolnice

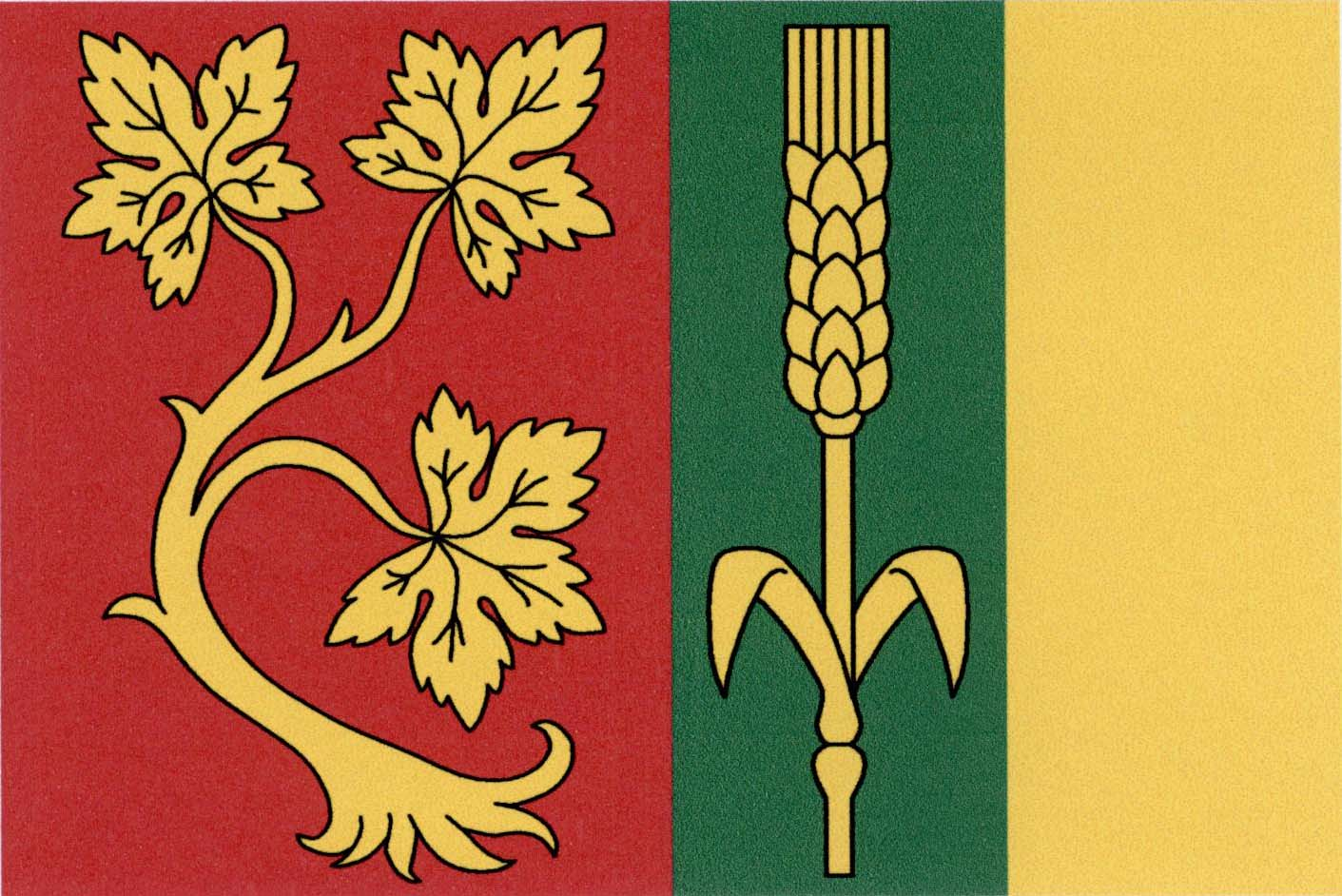
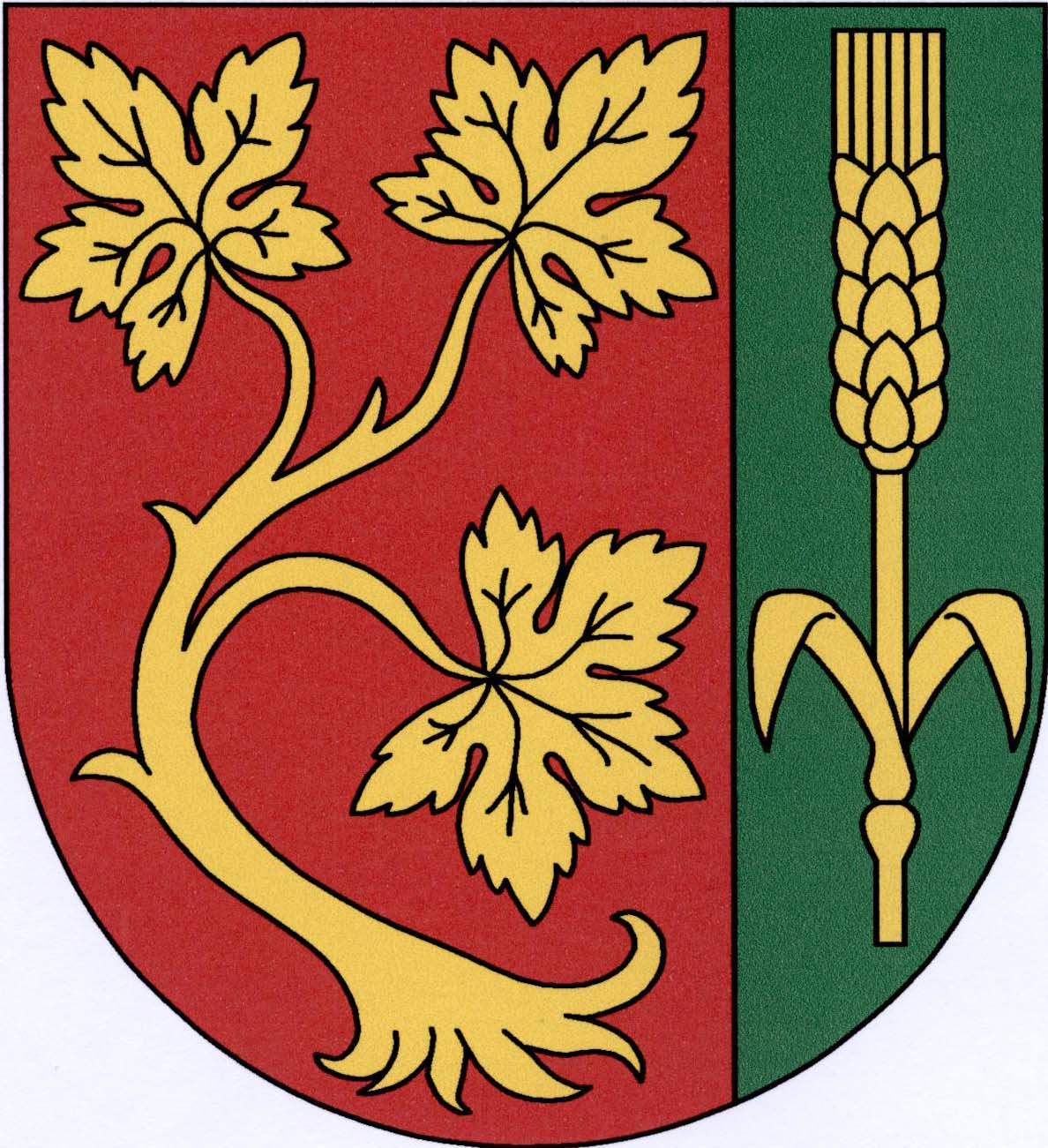
- Flag Coat of arms

- Location in the Czech Republic
- Coordinates: 50°18′32″N 13°50′55″E
- Country: Czech Republic
- Region: Ústí nad Labem
- District: Louny
- First mentioned: 1337

Area
  - Total: 7.75 km^{2} (2.99 sq mi)
- Elevation: 325 m (1,066 ft)

Population (2026-01-01)
  - Total: 444
  - Density: 57.3/km^{2} (148/sq mi)
- Time zone: UTC+1 (CET)
  - Summer (DST): UTC+2 (CEST)
- Postal code: 439 14
- Website: www.smolnice.cz

Smolnice is a municipality and village in Louny District in the Ústí nad Labem Region of the Czech Republic. It has about 400 inhabitants.

Smolnice lies approximately 7 kilometres (4 mi) south-east of Louny, 41 km (25 mi) south of Ústí nad Labem, and 49 km (30 mi) north-west of Prague.

== Demographics ==
Historical population
| Year | Pop. | ±% |
|---|---|---|
| 1869 | 534 | — |
| 1880 | 602 | +12.7% |
| 1890 | 642 | +6.6% |
| 1900 | 671 | +4.5% |
| 1910 | 722 | +7.6% |
| 1921 | 761 | +5.4% |
| 1930 | 784 | +3.0% |
| 1950 | 590 | −24.7% |
| 1961 | 570 | −3.4% |
| 1970 | 491 | −13.9% |
| 1980 | 428 | −12.8% |
| 1991 | 374 | −12.6% |
| 2001 | 370 | −1.1% |
| 2011 | 401 | +8.4% |
| 2021 | 457 | +14.0% |
Source: Censuses
