= Hříškov =

- Municipality
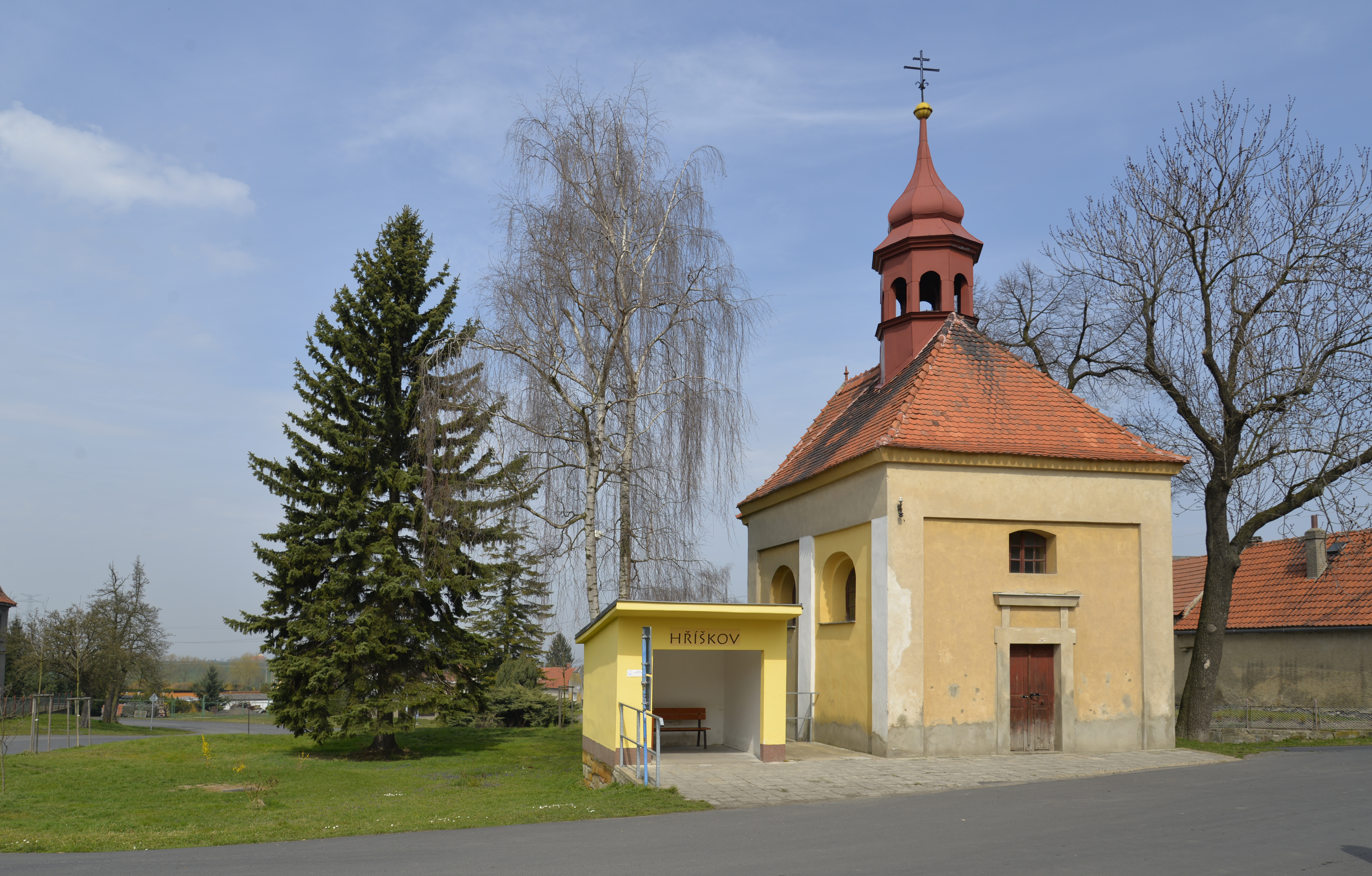
- Chapel of the Holy Trinity

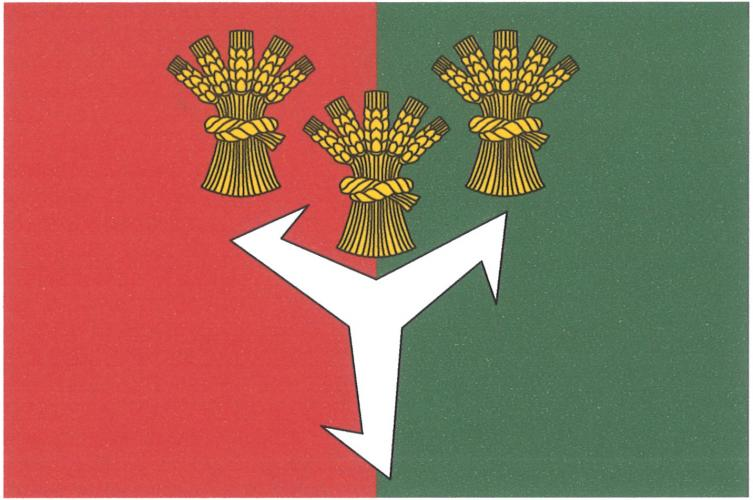
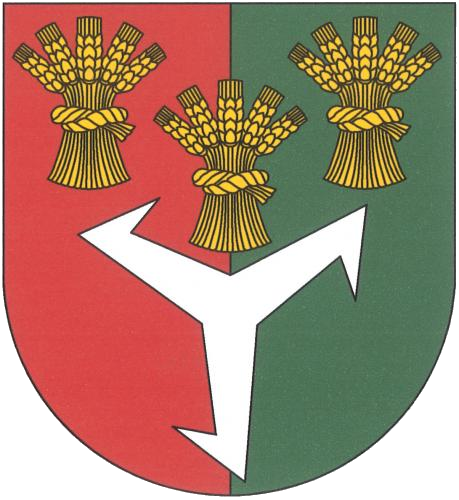
- Flag Coat of arms

- Location in the Czech Republic
- Coordinates: 50°17′29″N 13°51′52″E
- Country: Czech Republic
- Region: Ústí nad Labem
- District: Louny
- First mentioned: 1318

Area
  - Total: 10.26 km^{2} (3.96 sq mi)
- Elevation: 390 m (1,280 ft)

Population (2026-01-01)
  - Total: 395
  - Density: 38.5/km^{2} (99.7/sq mi)
- Time zone: UTC+1 (CET)
  - Summer (DST): UTC+2 (CEST)
- Postal codes: 439 04, 440 01
- Website: www.hriskov.cz

Hříškov (German: Rischkau) is a municipality and village in Louny District in the Ústí nad Labem Region of the Czech Republic. It has about 400 inhabitants.

Hříškov lies approximately 10 kilometres (6 mi) south-east of Louny, 44 km (27 mi) south of Ústí nad Labem, and 46 km (29 mi) north-west of Prague.

== Administrative division ==
Hříškov consists of three municipal parts (in brackets population according to the 2021 census):

- Hříškov (330)
- Bedřichovice (69)
- Hvížďalka (13)

== Demographics ==
Historical population
Year	Pop.	±%
1869	993	—
1880	973	−2.0%
1890	956	−1.7%
1900	978	+2.3%
1910	1,022	+4.5%
1921	935	−8.5%
1930	914	−2.2%
1950	637	−30.3%
1961	608	−4.6%
1970	539	−11.3%
1980	458	−15.0%
1991	346	−24.5%
2001	347	+0.3%
2011	395	+13.8%
2021	412	+4.3%
Source: Censuses
