= Holedeč =

- Municipality
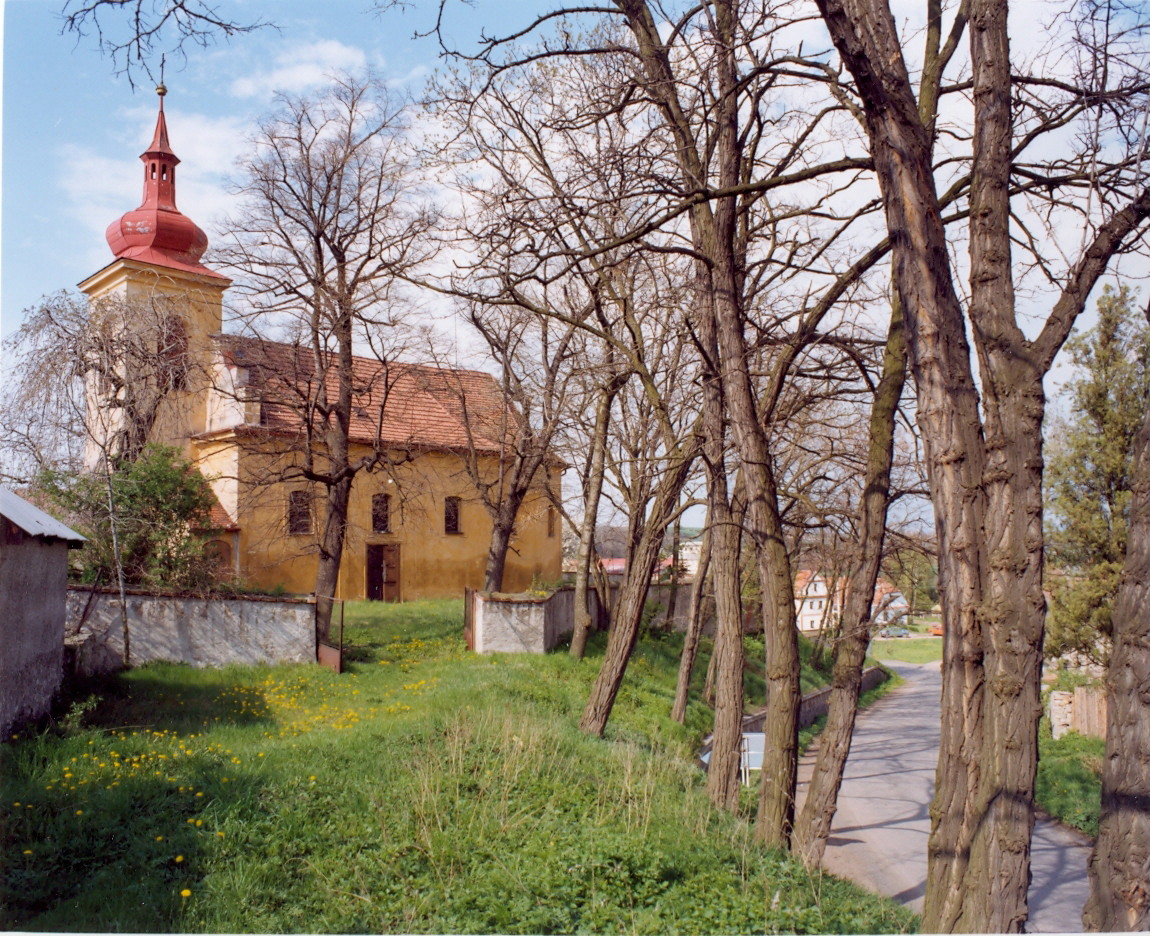
- Church of Saint Bartholomew in Holedeček

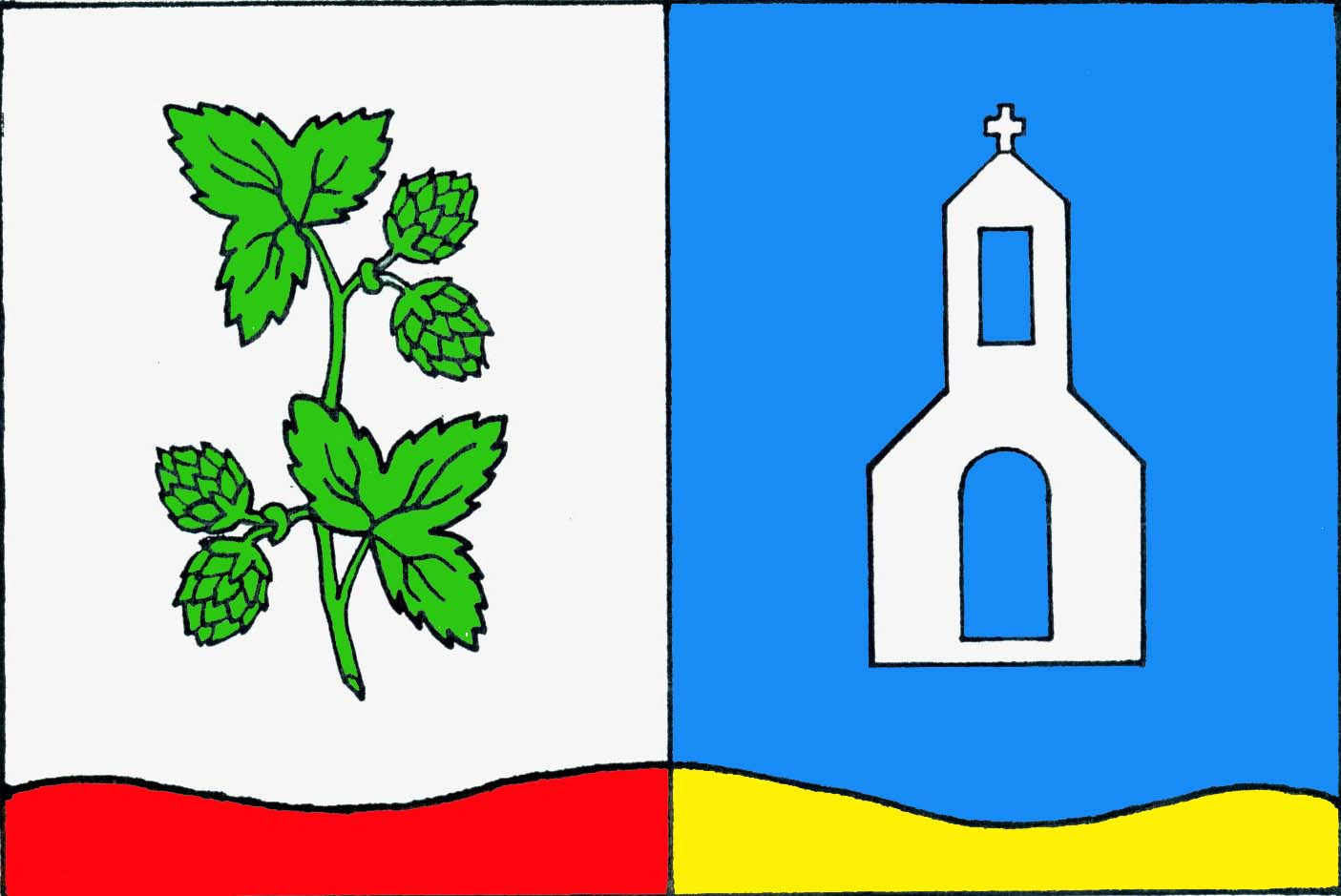
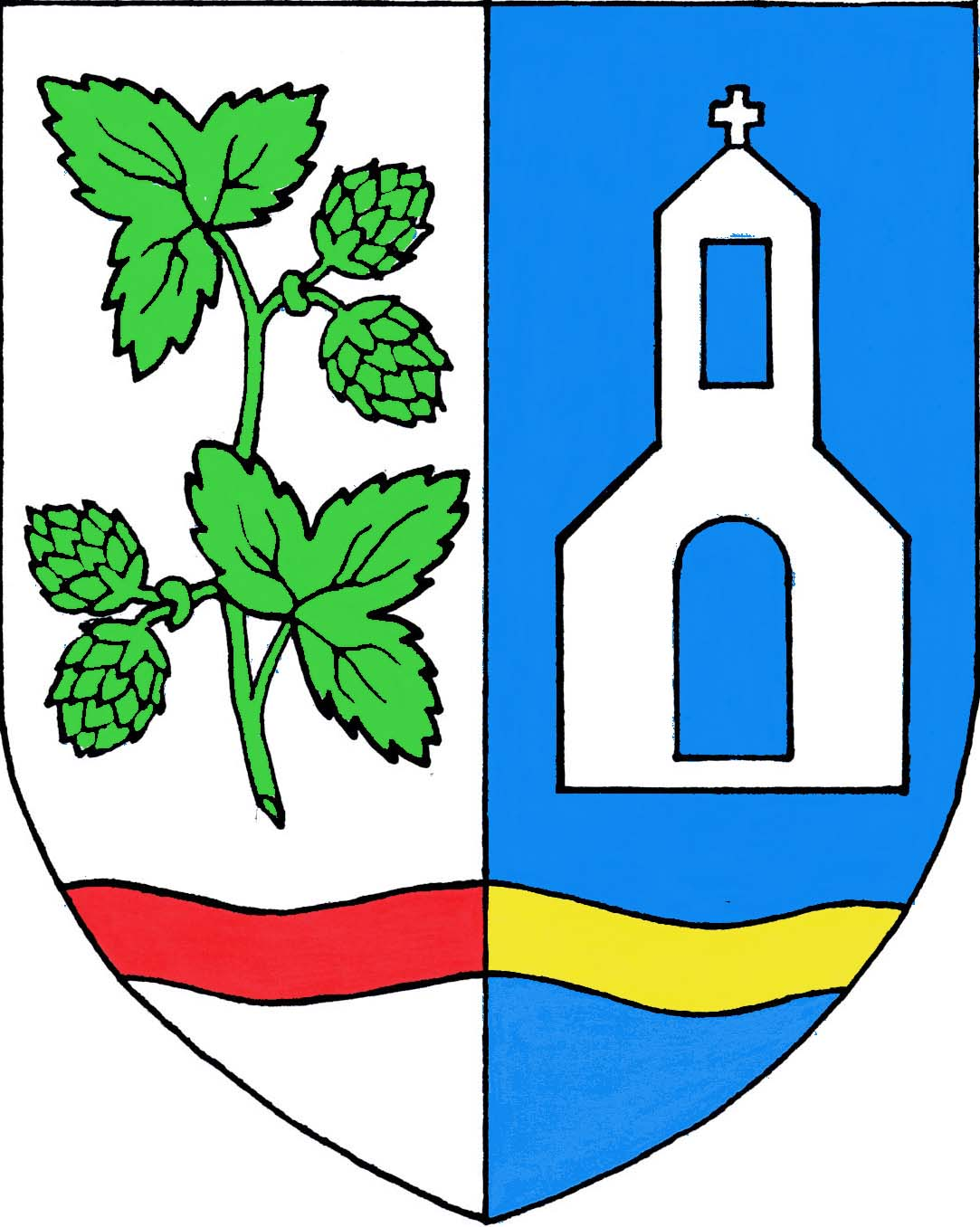
- Flag Coat of arms

- Location in the Czech Republic
- Coordinates: 50°16′39″N 13°33′47″E
- Country: Czech Republic
- Region: Ústí nad Labem
- District: Louny
- First mentioned: 1318

Area
  - Total: 18.56 km^{2} (7.17 sq mi)
- Elevation: 219 m (719 ft)

Population (2026-01-01)
  - Total: 673
  - Density: 36.3/km^{2} (93.9/sq mi)
- Time zone: UTC+1 (CET)
  - Summer (DST): UTC+2 (CEST)
- Postal code: 438 01
- Website: www.holedec.cz

Holedeč is a municipality and village in Louny District in the Ústí nad Labem Region of the Czech Republic. It has about 700 inhabitants.

Holedeč lies approximately 20 kilometres (12 mi) south-west of Louny, 56 km (35 mi) south-west of Ústí nad Labem, and 64 km (40 mi) west of Prague.

== Administrative division ==
Holedeč consists of four municipal parts (in brackets population according to the 2021 census):

- Holedeč (385)
- Holedeček (84)
- Stránky (48)
- Veletice (86)

== Demographics ==
Historical population
Year	Pop.	±%
1869	1,312	—
1880	1,459	+11.2%
1890	1,456	−0.2%
1900	1,549	+6.4%
1910	1,476	−4.7%
1921	1,444	−2.2%
1930	1,536	+6.4%
1950	798	−48.0%
1961	799	+0.1%
1970	735	−8.0%
1980	621	−15.5%
1991	509	−18.0%
2001	495	−2.8%
2011	535	+8.1%
2021	603	+12.7%
Source: Censuses
