= Koštice =

- Municipality
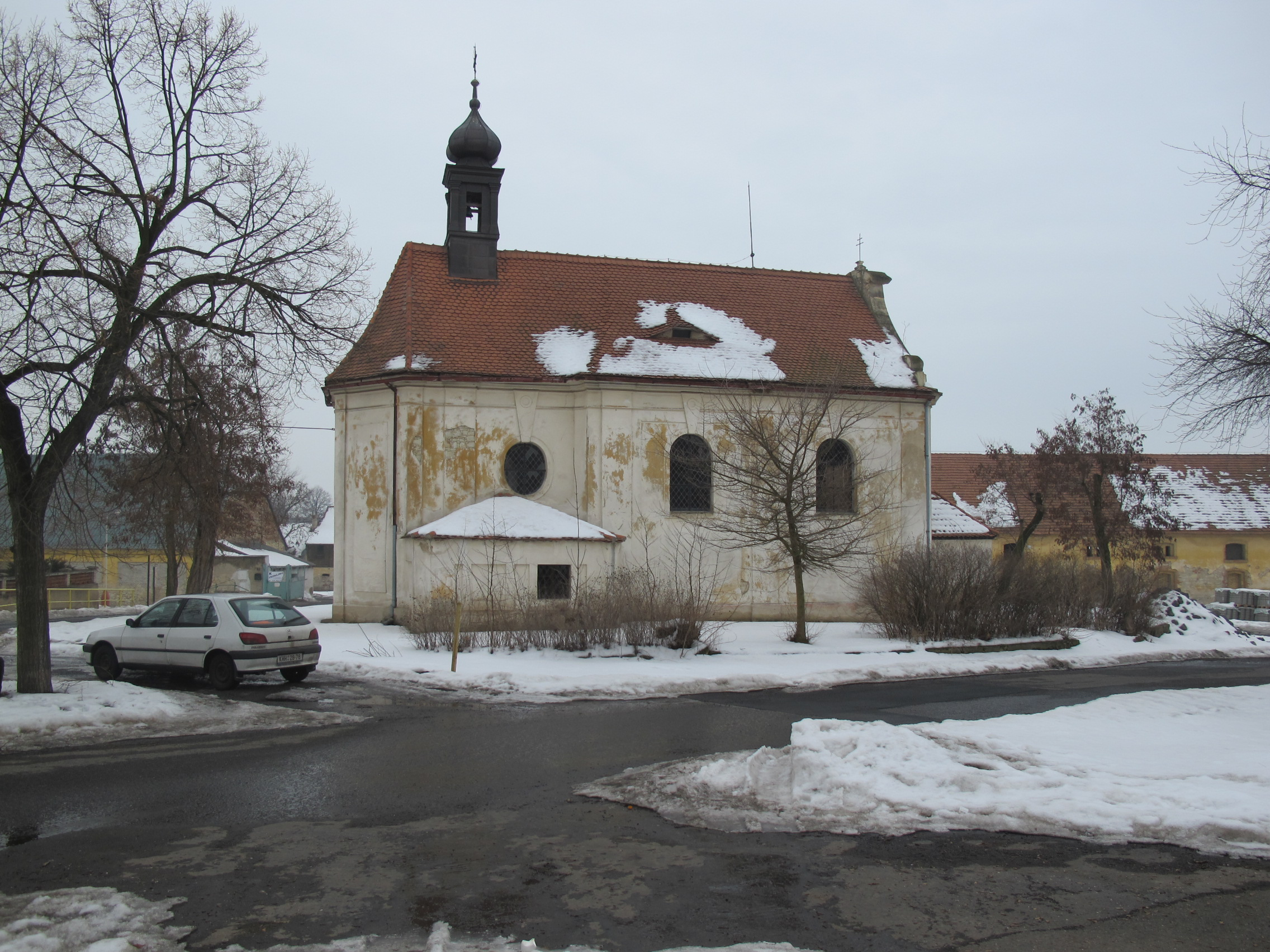
- Church of Saint Anthony of Padua

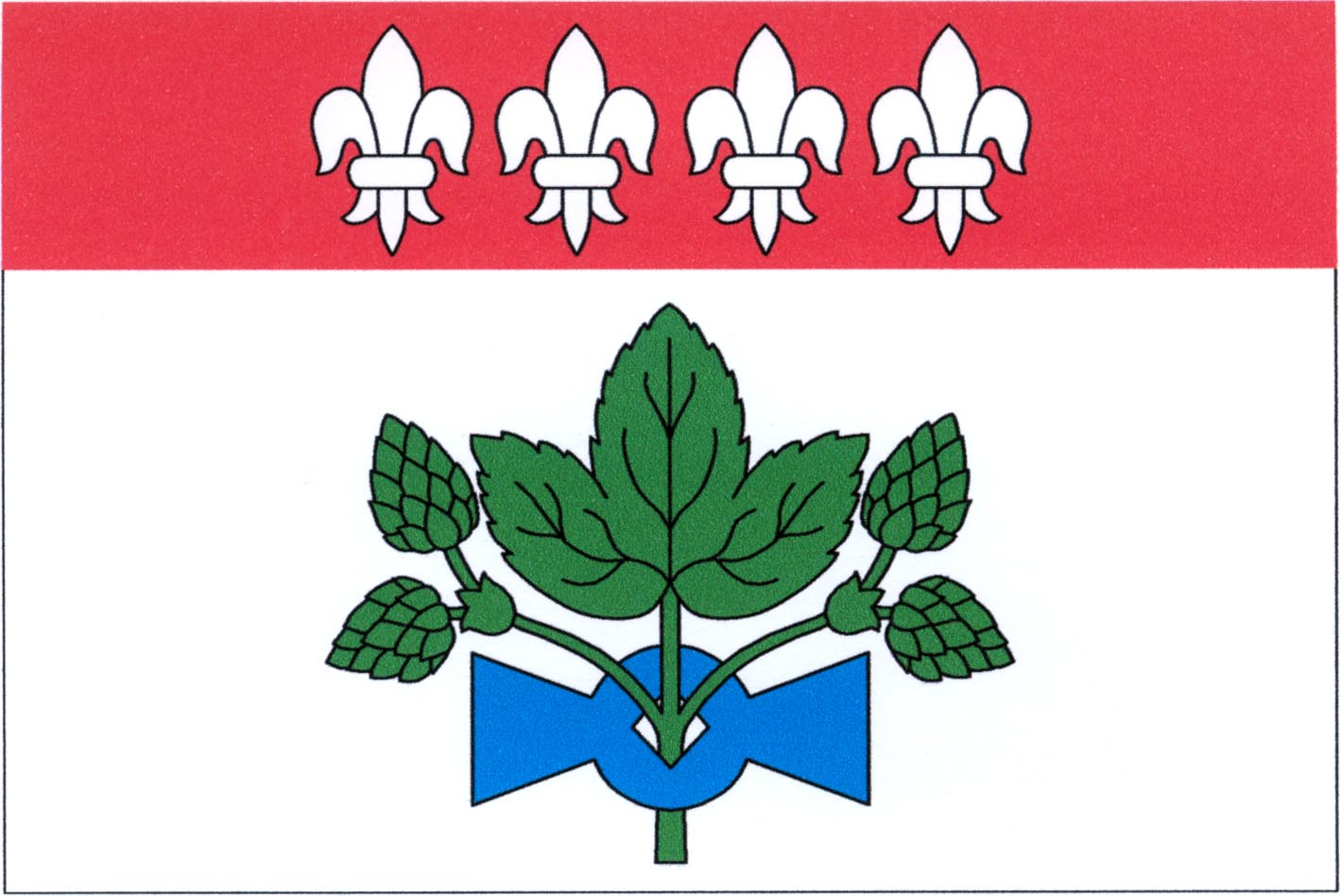
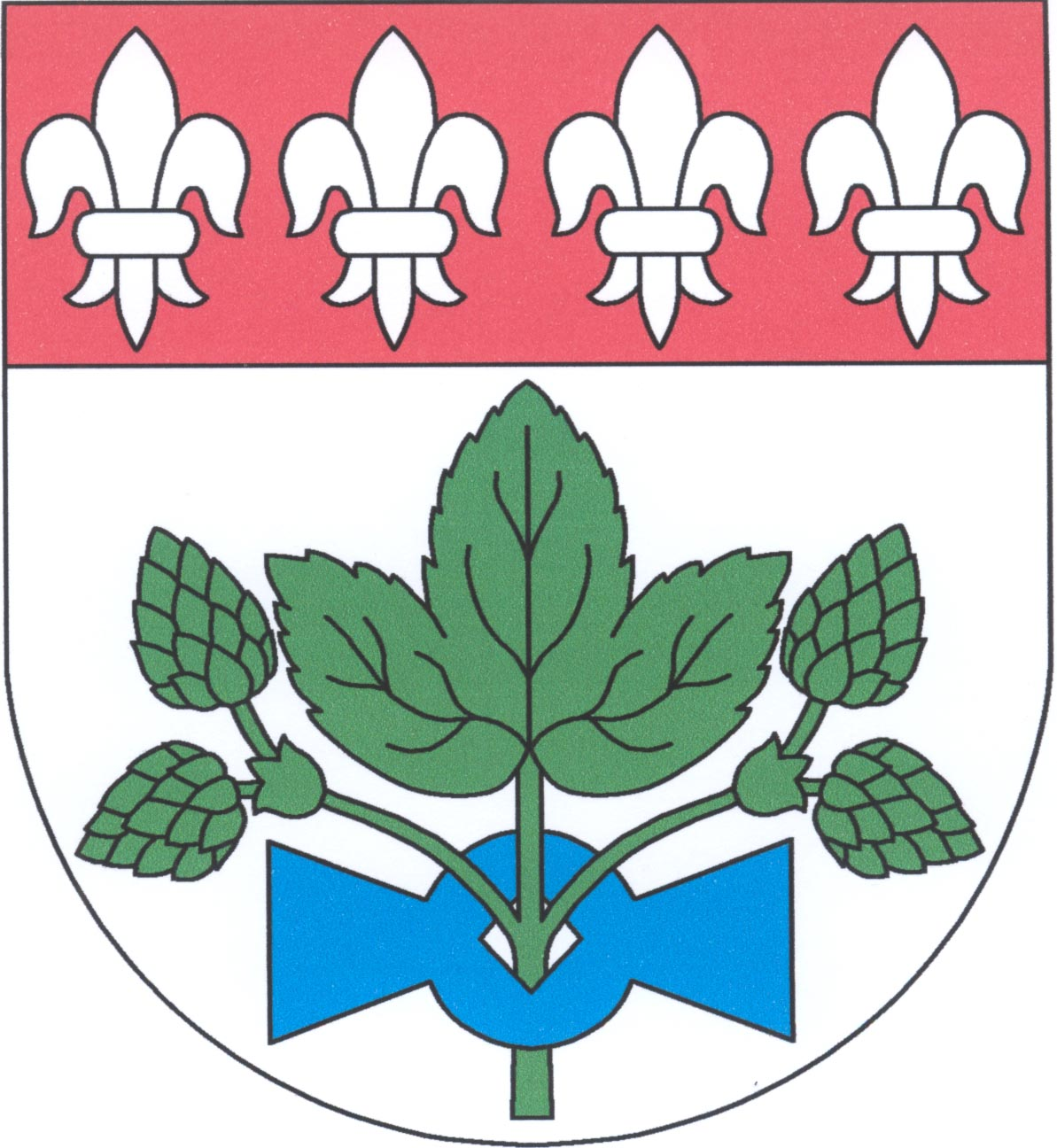
- Flag Coat of arms

- Location in the Czech Republic
- Coordinates: 50°24′10″N 13°56′31″E
- Country: Czech Republic
- Region: Ústí nad Labem
- District: Louny
- First mentioned: 1373

Area
  - Total: 16.73 km^{2} (6.46 sq mi)
- Elevation: 175 m (574 ft)

Population (2026-01-01)
  - Total: 610
  - Density: 36/km^{2} (94/sq mi)
- Time zone: UTC+1 (CET)
  - Summer (DST): UTC+2 (CEST)
- Postal code: 439 21
- Website: obeckostice.cz

Koštice is a municipality and village in Louny District in the Ústí nad Labem Region of the Czech Republic. It has about 600 inhabitants.

Koštice lies approximately 12 kilometres (7 mi) north-east of Louny, 30 km (19 mi) south of Ústí nad Labem, and 49 km (30 mi) north-west of Prague.

== Administrative division ==
Koštice consists of four municipal parts (in brackets population according to the 2021 census):

- Koštice (433)
- Vojnice (66)
- Vojničky (56)
- Želevice (45)

== History ==
The first written mention of Koštice is from 1373.

== Demographics ==
Historical population
| Year | Pop. | ±% |
|---|---|---|
| 1869 | 1,024 | — |
| 1880 | 1,046 | +2.1% |
| 1890 | 1,132 | +8.2% |
| 1900 | 1,161 | +2.6% |
| 1910 | 1,191 | +2.6% |
| 1921 | 1,222 | +2.6% |
| 1930 | 1,281 | +4.8% |
| 1950 | 913 | −28.7% |
| 1961 | 858 | −6.0% |
| 1970 | 795 | −7.3% |
| 1980 | 749 | −5.8% |
| 1991 | 604 | −19.4% |
| 2001 | 578 | −4.3% |
| 2011 | 594 | +2.8% |
| 2021 | 600 | +1.0% |
Source: Censuses
