= Veltěže =

- Municipality
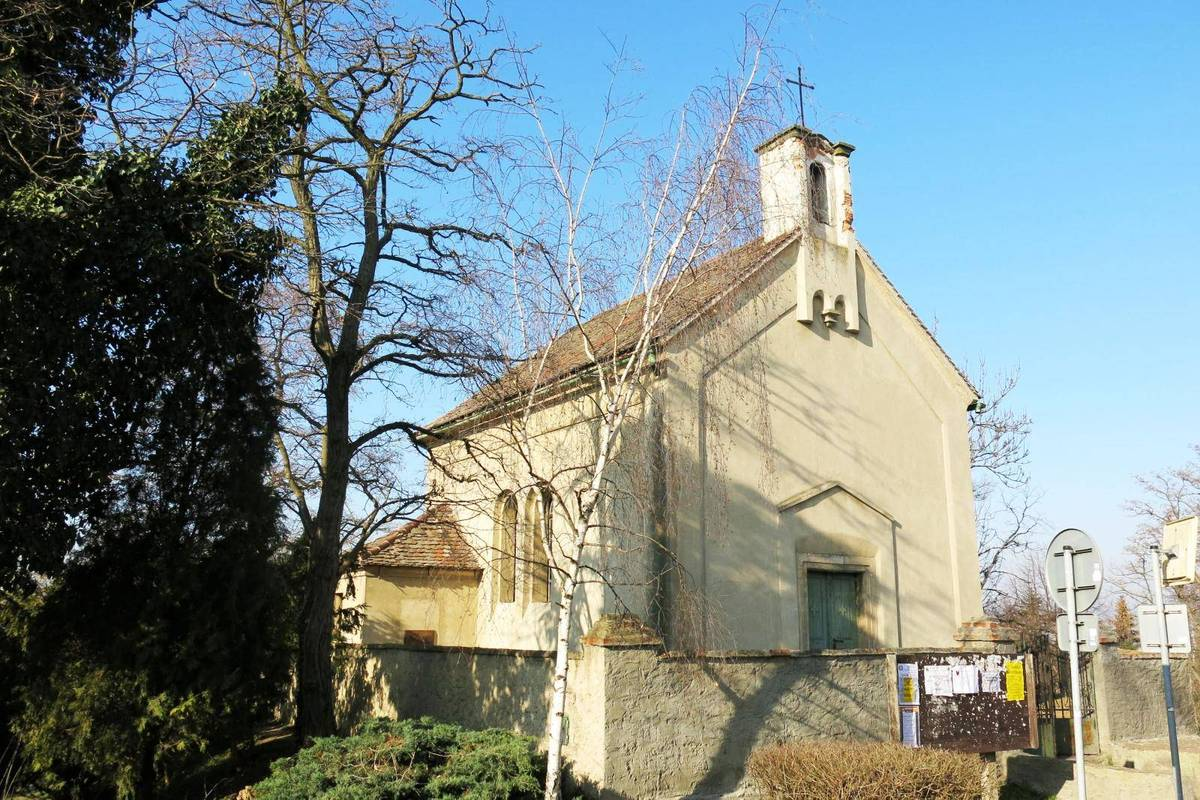
- Chapel of Saint Florian

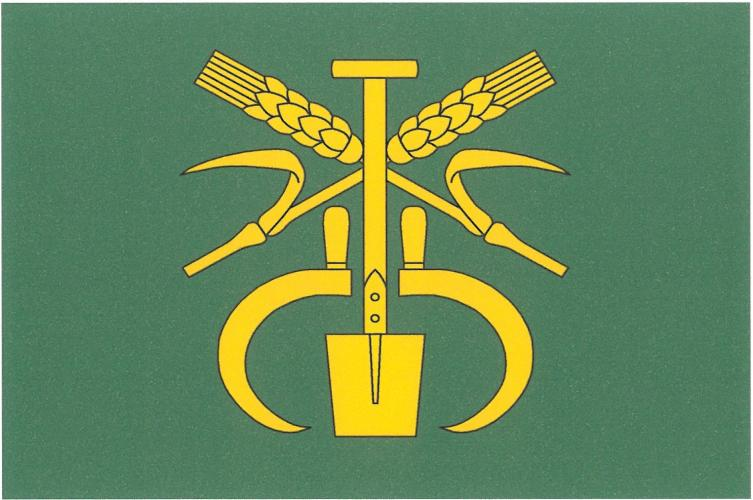
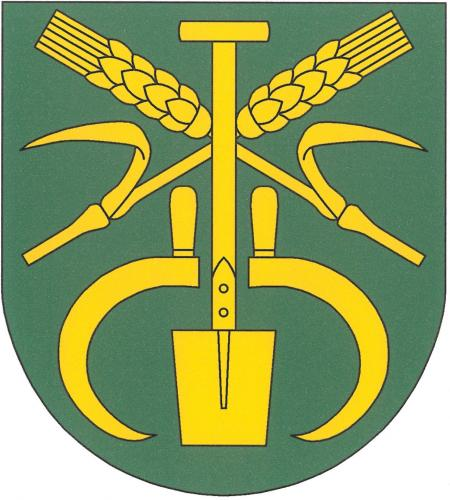
- Flag Coat of arms

- Location in the Czech Republic
- Coordinates: 50°21′12″N 13°52′31″E
- Country: Czech Republic
- Region: Ústí nad Labem
- District: Louny
- First mentioned: 1201

Area
  - Total: 4.68 km^{2} (1.81 sq mi)
- Elevation: 200 m (660 ft)

Population (2026-01-01)
  - Total: 417
  - Density: 89.1/km^{2} (231/sq mi)
- Time zone: UTC+1 (CET)
  - Summer (DST): UTC+2 (CEST)
- Postal code: 440 01
- Website: www.velteze.cz

Veltěže is a municipality and village in Louny District in the Ústí nad Labem Region of the Czech Republic. It has about 400 inhabitants.

Veltěže lies approximately 7 kilometres (4 mi) east of Louny, 37 km (23 mi) south of Ústí nad Labem, and 48 km (30 mi) north-west of Prague.

== Demographics ==
Historical population
Year	Pop.	±%
1869	340	—
1880	388	+14.1%
1890	365	−5.9%
1900	450	+23.3%
1910	567	+26.0%
1921	586	+3.4%
1930	645	+10.1%
1950	504	−21.9%
1961	497	−1.4%
1970	455	−8.5%
1980	397	−12.7%
1991	330	−16.9%
2001	383	+16.1%
2011	406	+6.0%
2021	424	+4.4%
Source: Censuses
