= Zbrašín =

- Municipality
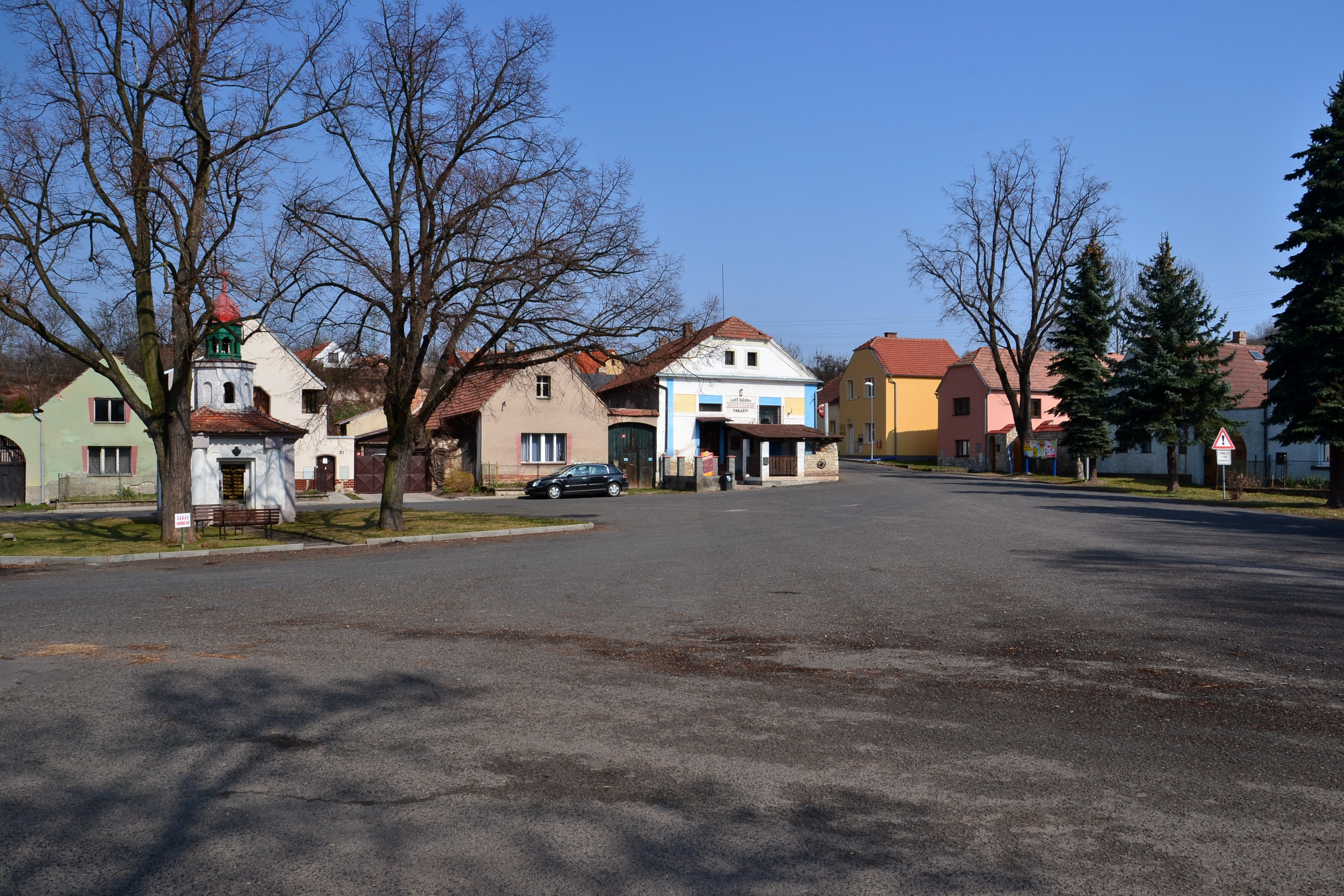
- Centre of Zbrašín

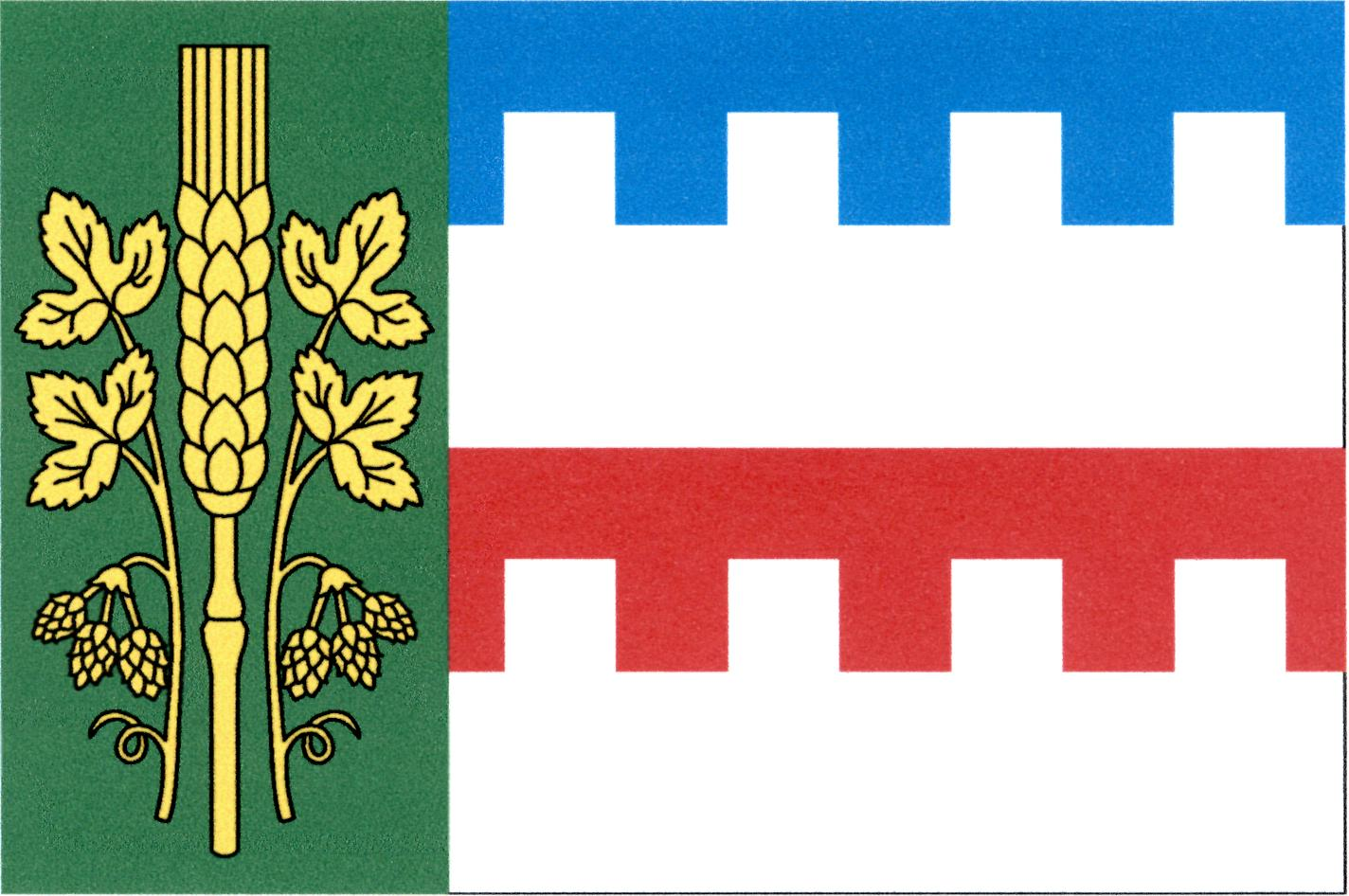
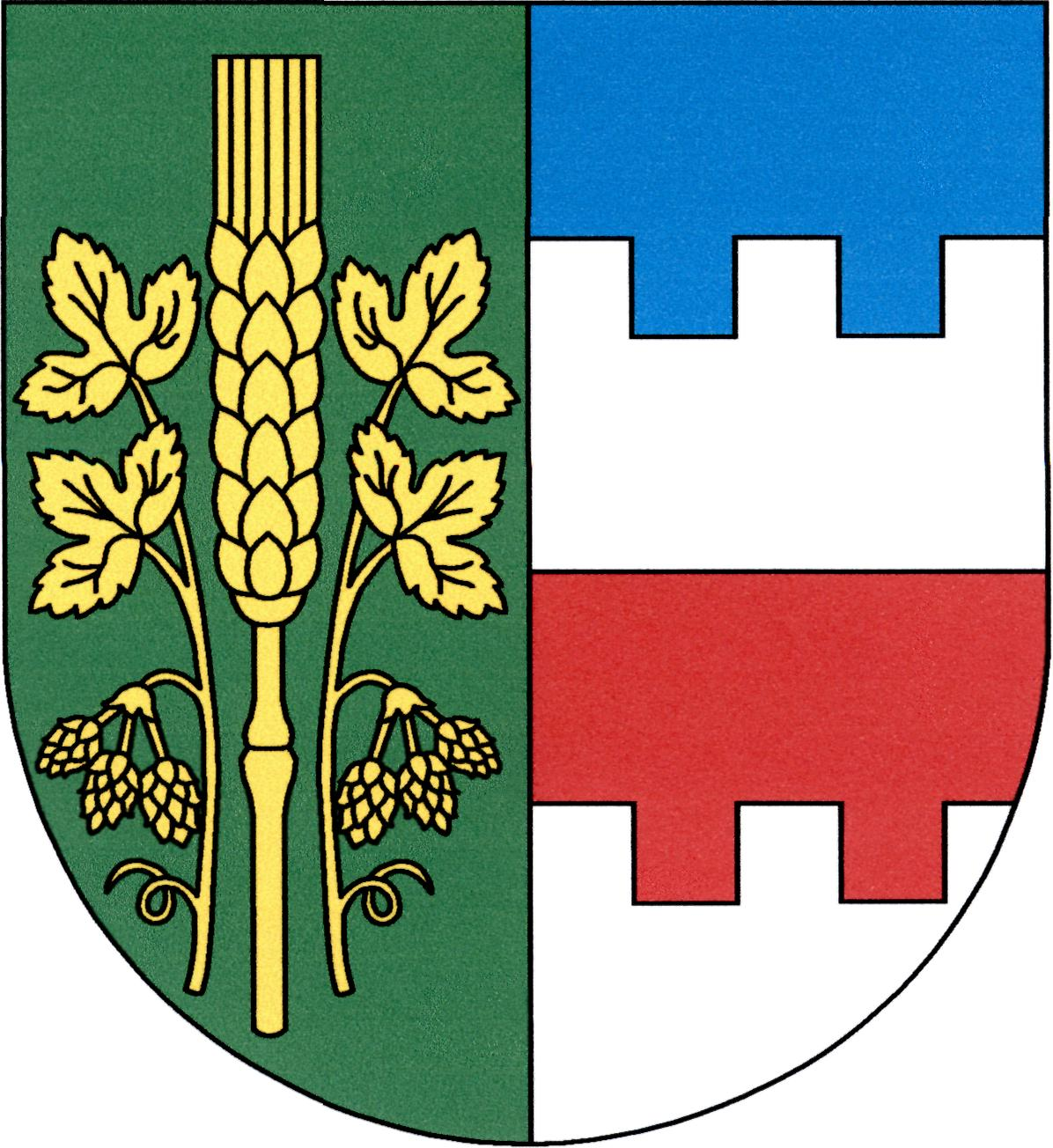
- Flag Coat of arms

- Location in the Czech Republic
- Coordinates: 50°17′58″N 13°45′58″E
- Country: Czech Republic
- Region: Ústí nad Labem
- District: Louny
- First mentioned: 1358

Area
  - Total: 12.75 km^{2} (4.92 sq mi)
- Elevation: 303 m (994 ft)

Population (2026-01-01)
  - Total: 418
  - Density: 32.8/km^{2} (84.9/sq mi)
- Time zone: UTC+1 (CET)
  - Summer (DST): UTC+2 (CEST)
- Postal code: 440 01
- Website: www.zbrasin.cz

Zbrašín is a municipality and village in Louny District in the Ústí nad Labem Region of the Czech Republic. It has about 400 inhabitants.

Zbrašín lies approximately 8 kilometres (5 mi) south of Louny, 45 km (28 mi) south-west of Ústí nad Labem, and 53 km (33 mi) north-west of Prague.

== Administrative division ==
Zbrašín consists of three municipal parts (in brackets population according to the 2021 census):

- Zbrašín (178)
- Hořany (115)
- Senkov (102)

== Demographics ==
Historical population
Year	Pop.	±%
1869	715	—
1880	755	+5.6%
1890	854	+13.1%
1900	874	+2.3%
1910	866	−0.9%
1921	902	+4.2%
1930	843	−6.5%
1950	557	−33.9%
1961	514	−7.7%
1970	450	−12.5%
1980	350	−22.2%
1991	287	−18.0%
2001	305	+6.3%
2011	309	+1.3%
2021	395	+27.8%
Source: Censuses
