= Hřivice =

- Municipality
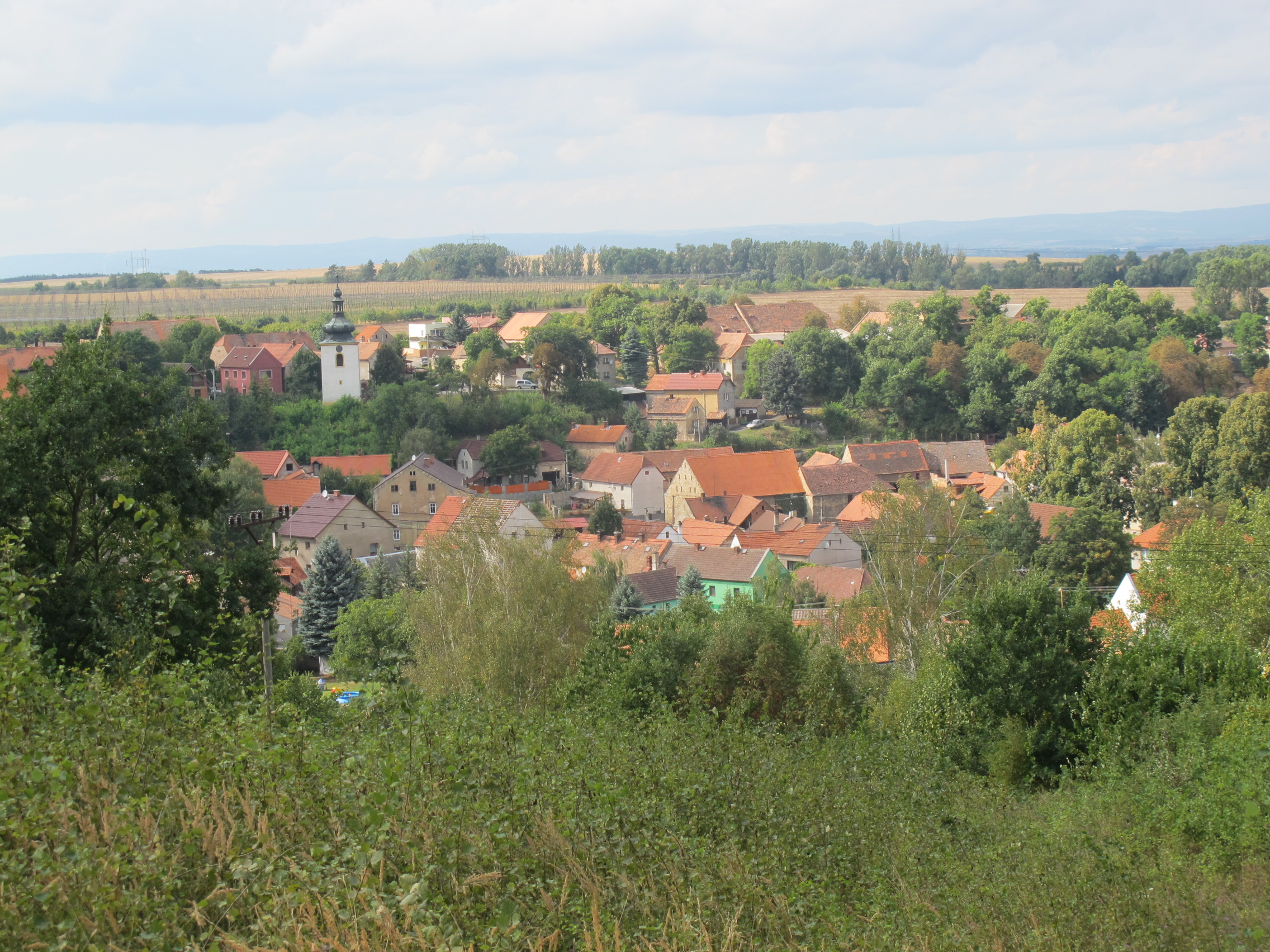
- General view

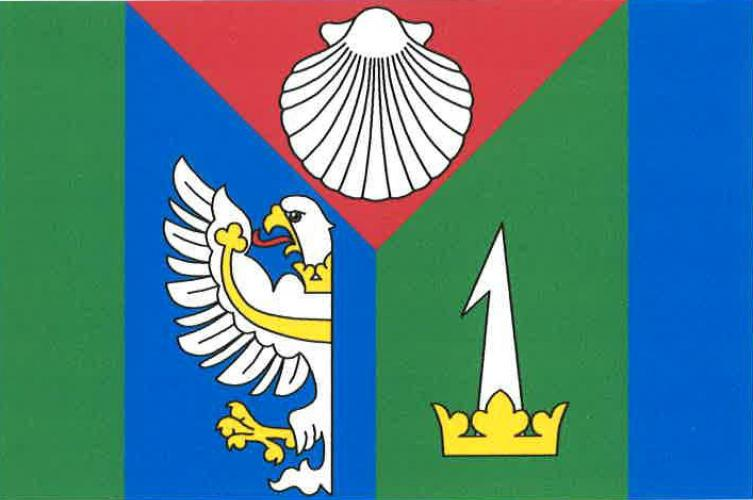
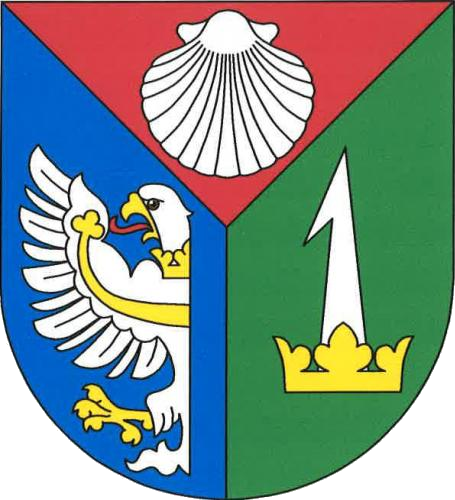
- Flag Coat of arms

- Location in the Czech Republic
- Coordinates: 50°17′18″N 13°43′49″E
- Country: Czech Republic
- Region: Ústí nad Labem
- District: Louny
- First mentioned: 1316

Area
  - Total: 13.42 km^{2} (5.18 sq mi)
- Elevation: 270 m (890 ft)

Population (2026-01-01)
  - Total: 629
  - Density: 46.9/km^{2} (121/sq mi)
- Time zone: UTC+1 (CET)
  - Summer (DST): UTC+2 (CEST)
- Postal codes: 439 65, 440 01
- Website: www.hrivice.cz

Hřivice is a municipality and village in Louny District in the Ústí nad Labem Region of the Czech Republic. It has about 600 inhabitants.

Hřivice lies approximately 10 kilometres (6 mi) south-west of Louny, 48 km (30 mi) south-west of Ústí nad Labem, and 54 km (34 mi) north-west of Prague.

== Administrative division ==
Hřivice consists of three municipal parts (in brackets population according to the 2021 census):

- Hřivice (352)
- Markvarec (63)
- Touchovice (206)

== Demographics ==
Historical population
Year	Pop.	±%
1869	1,076	—
1880	1,181	+9.8%
1890	1,286	+8.9%
1900	1,370	+6.5%
1910	1,351	−1.4%
1921	1,414	+4.7%
1930	1,446	+2.3%
1950	1,074	−25.7%
1961	986	−8.2%
1970	897	−9.0%
1980	740	−17.5%
1991	594	−19.7%
2001	582	−2.0%
2011	623	+7.0%
2021	621	−0.3%
Source: Censuses
