= Počedělice =

- Municipality
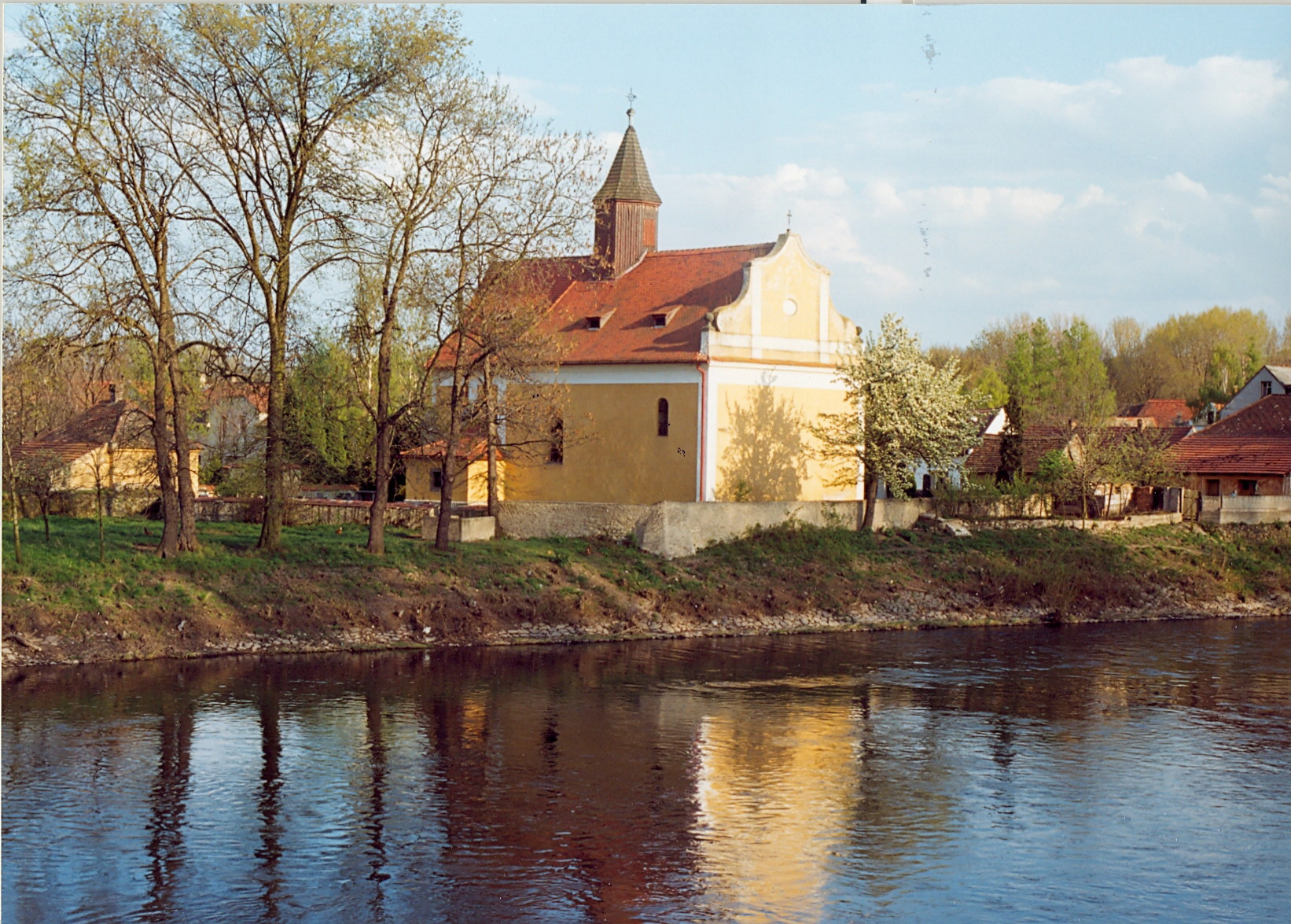
- Church of Saint Gall

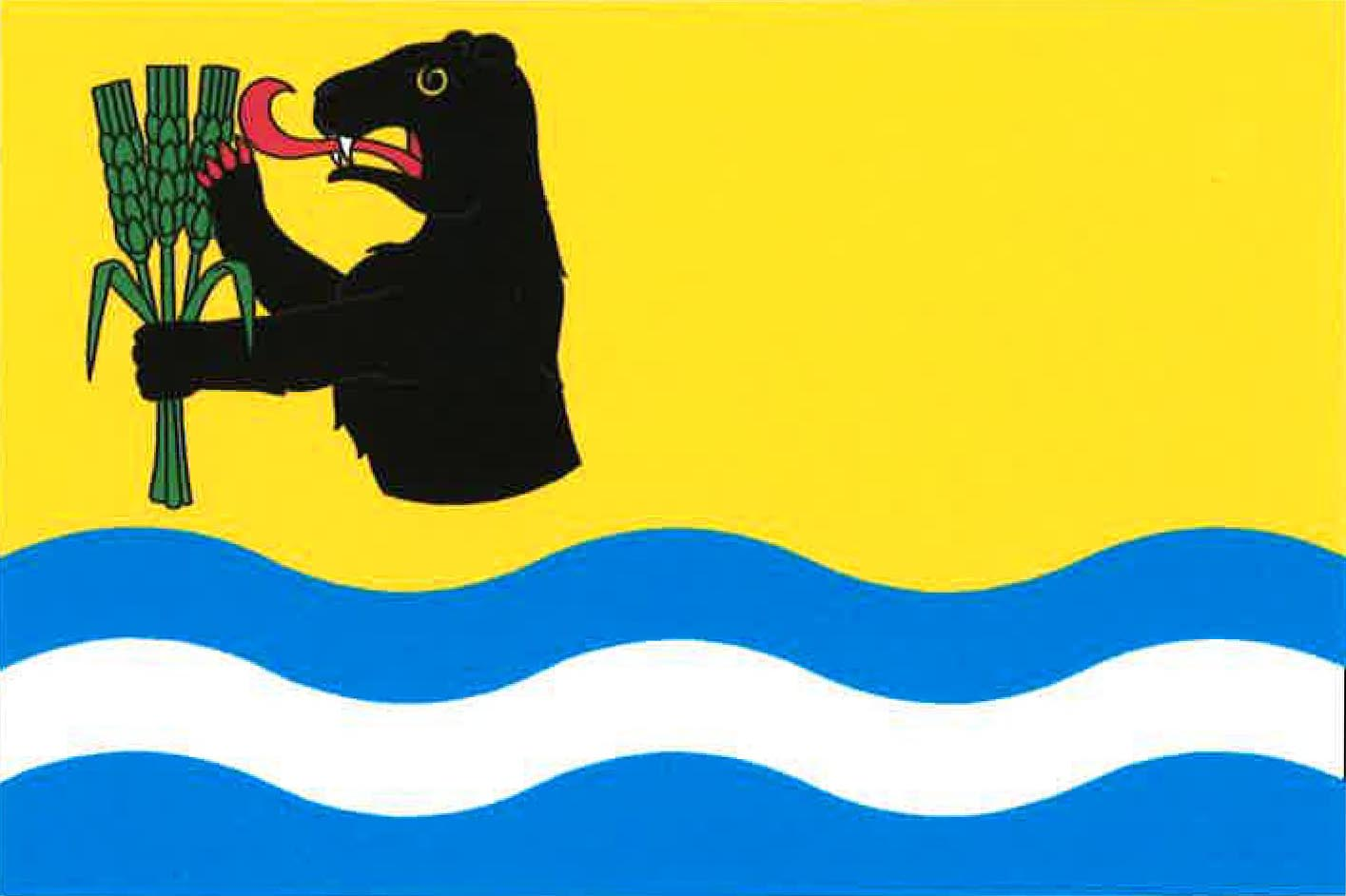
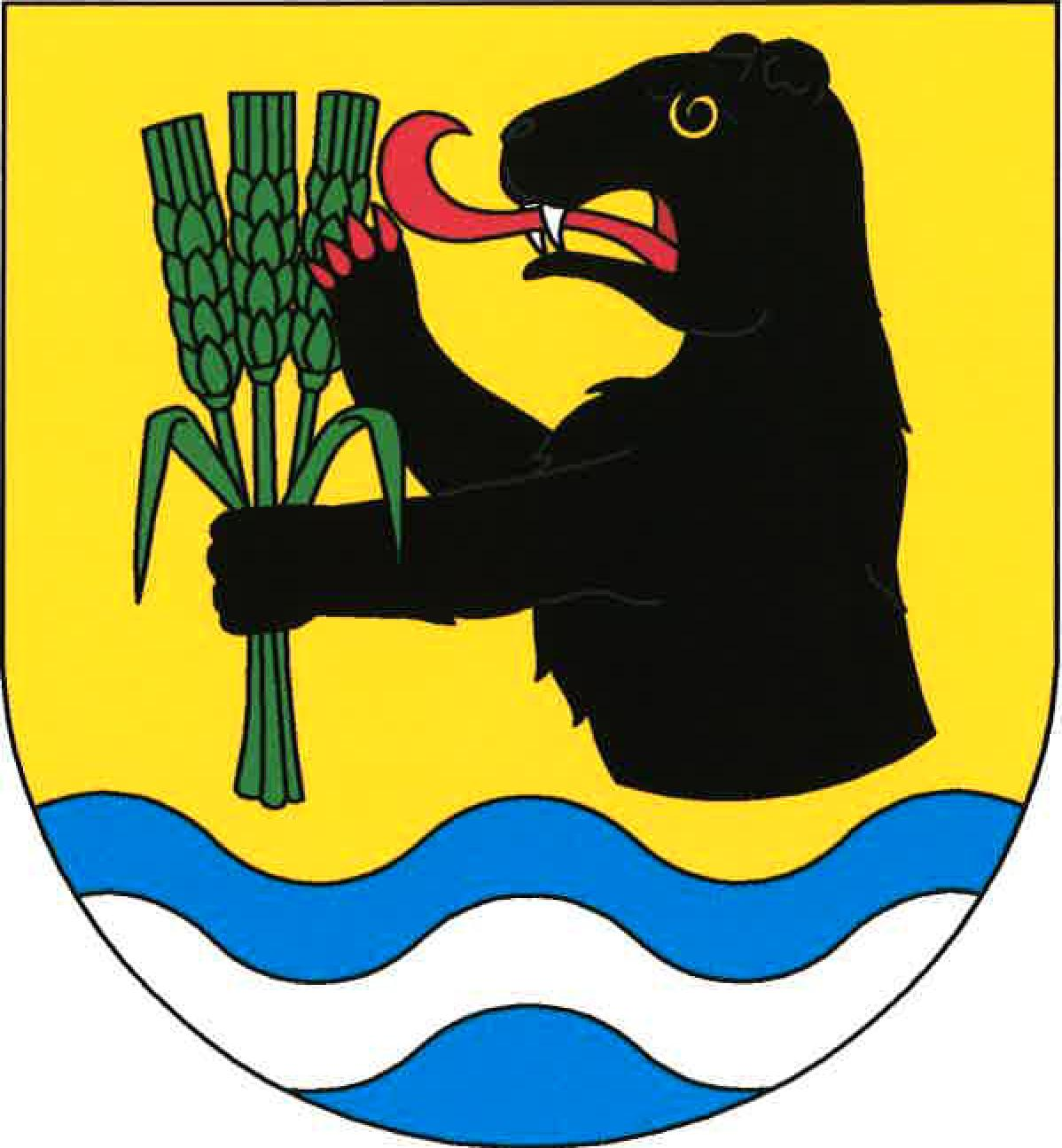
- Flag Coat of arms

- Location in the Czech Republic
- Coordinates: 50°22′19″N 13°53′16″E
- Country: Czech Republic
- Region: Ústí nad Labem
- District: Louny
- First mentioned: 1219

Area
  - Total: 11.62 km^{2} (4.49 sq mi)
- Elevation: 173 m (568 ft)

Population (2026-01-01)
  - Total: 304
  - Density: 26.2/km^{2} (67.8/sq mi)
- Time zone: UTC+1 (CET)
  - Summer (DST): UTC+2 (CEST)
- Postal code: 440 01
- Website: www.pocedelice.cz

Počedělice is a municipality and village in Louny District in the Ústí nad Labem Region of the Czech Republic. It has about 300 inhabitants.

Počedělice lies approximately 7 kilometres (4 mi) east of Louny, 34 km (21 mi) south of Ústí nad Labem, and 50 km (31 mi) north-west of Prague.

== Administrative division ==
Počedělice consists of three municipal parts (in brackets population according to the 2021 census):

- Počedělice (119)
- Orasice (85)
- Volenice (92)

== Demographics ==
Historical population
Year	Pop.	±%
1869	658	—
1880	680	+3.3%
1890	694	+2.1%
1900	744	+7.2%
1910	766	+3.0%
1921	742	−3.1%
1930	712	−4.0%
1950	546	−23.3%
1961	496	−9.2%
1970	436	−12.1%
1980	347	−20.4%
1991	280	−19.3%
2001	278	−0.7%
2011	262	−5.8%
2021	296	+13.0%
Source: Censuses
