= Úherce (Louny District) =

- Municipality
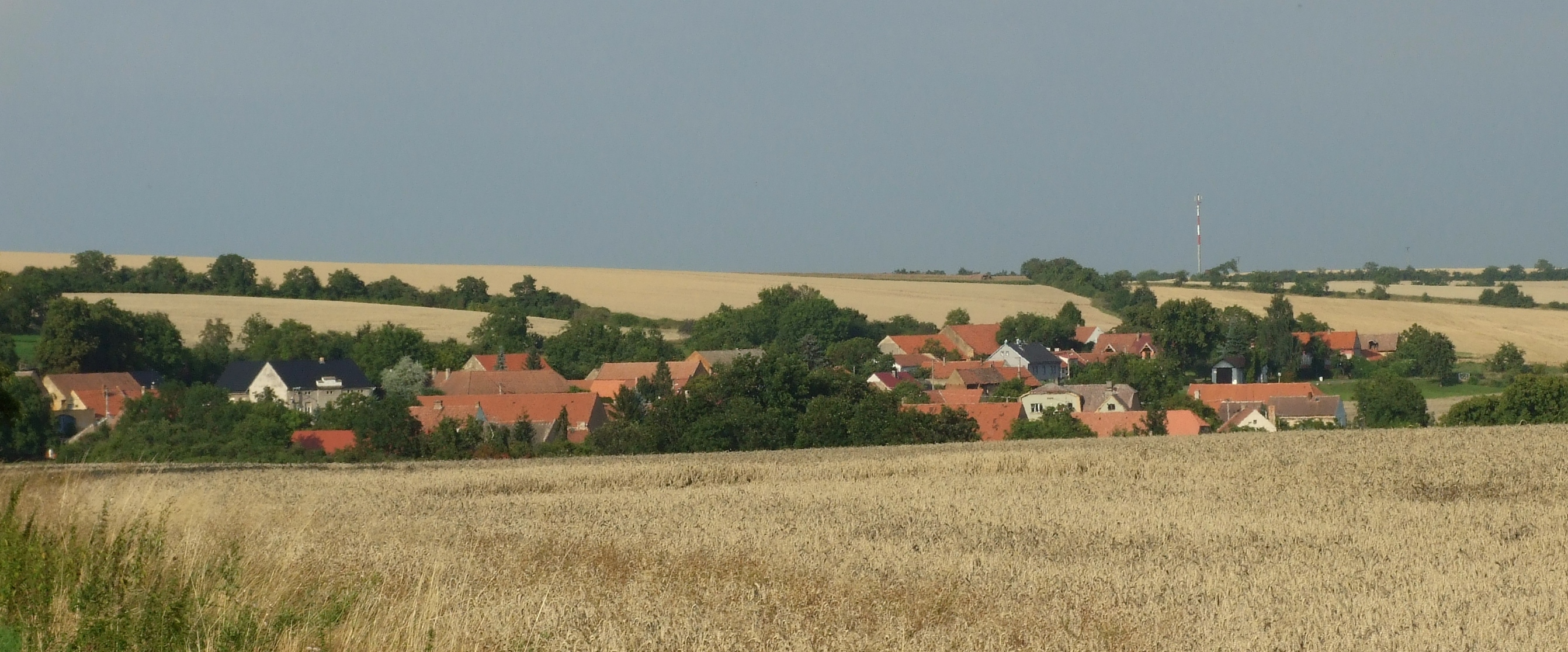
- View from the south

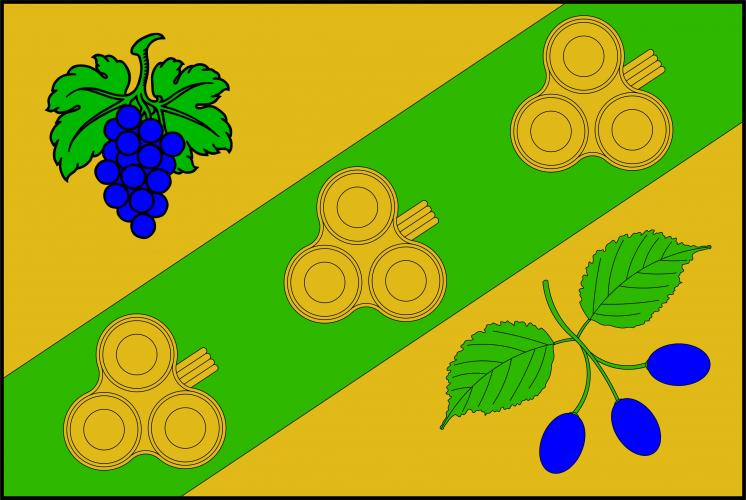
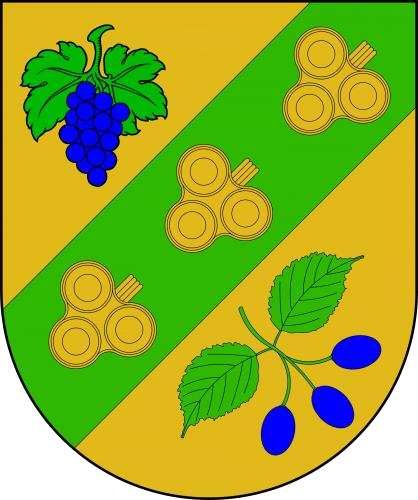
- Flag Coat of arms

- Location in the Czech Republic
- Coordinates: 50°17′53″N 13°56′57″E
- Country: Czech Republic
- Region: Ústí nad Labem
- District: Louny
- First mentioned: 1088

Area
  - Total: 3.47 km^{2} (1.34 sq mi)
- Elevation: 305 m (1,001 ft)

Population (2026-01-01)
  - Total: 96
  - Density: 28/km^{2} (72/sq mi)
- Time zone: UTC+1 (CET)
  - Summer (DST): UTC+2 (CEST)
- Postal code: 440 01
- Website: www.obec-uherce.cz

Úherce is a municipality and village in Louny District in the Ústí nad Labem Region of the Czech Republic. It has about 100 inhabitants.

Úherce lies approximately 13 kilometres (8 mi) south-east of Louny, 41 km (25 mi) south of Ústí nad Labem, and 42 km (26 mi) north-west of Prague.

== Demographics ==
Historical population
| Year | Pop. | ±% |
|---|---|---|
| 1869 | 291 | — |
| 1880 | 311 | +6.9% |
| 1890 | 291 | −6.4% |
| 1900 | 289 | −0.7% |
| 1910 | 295 | +2.1% |
| 1921 | 265 | −10.2% |
| 1930 | 236 | −10.9% |
| 1950 | 165 | −30.1% |
| 1961 | 156 | −5.5% |
| 1970 | 123 | −21.2% |
| 1980 | 101 | −17.9% |
| 1991 | 72 | −28.7% |
| 2001 | 58 | −19.4% |
| 2011 | 75 | +29.3% |
| 2021 | 84 | +12.0% |
Source: Censuses
