= Berlin Demography Forum =

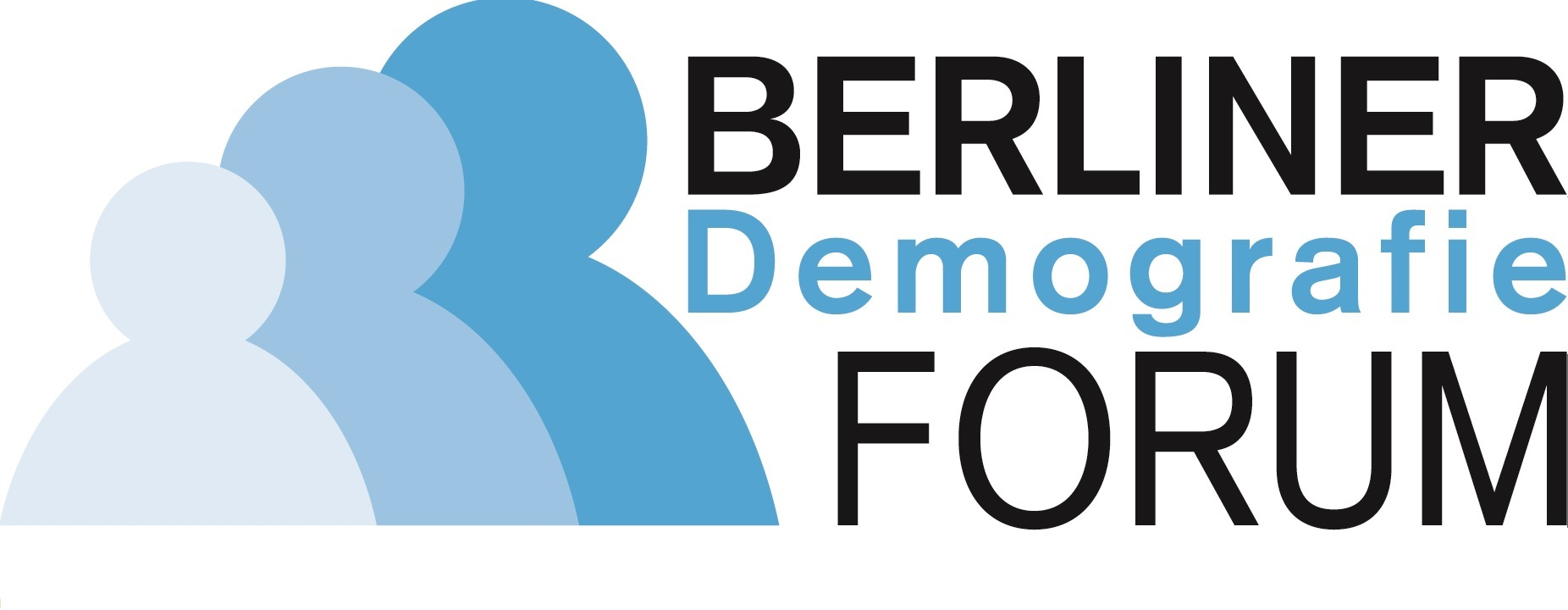
- Founded: 2011
- Founder: Allianz SE, BMFSFJ, BMI, ESMT
- Type: Public-Private Partnership
- Purpose: Demography
- Location: Pariser Platz 6, 10117 Berlin
- Website: https://www.berlinerdemografieforum.org/en/

The Berlin Demography Forum (BDF) is a global, non-partisan platform providing a new impetus to raise awareness of the significance of demographic change both at a national and international level. The forum brings together high-ranking politicians, scientists, business leaders, and representatives of international organisations and civil society to debate potential solutions and to contribute to sustainable development.

== Conferences ==
Conference themes were: “Family – Children – Society” at the BDF 2012, “Generations – Learning – Prosperity“ at the BDF 2013, “Trust – Security – Solidarity” at the BDF 2014 and "Activity – Health – Participation" in 2015. The fifth BDF took place on February 24–25, 2016 on the topics of „Labour – Perspectives – Prosperity“. The sixth BDF is going to take place on February 15–16, 2017 in Berlin.

== Organization ==
The BDF is a cooperation between the German Federal Ministry of Family Affairs, Senior Citizens, Women and Youth and Allianz SE. In addition, the German Federal Ministries of the Interior and Health contribute to this Forum. The European School of Management and Technology (ESMT) is the host and partner of the BDF. Vodafone Foundation Germany supports the Forum by sponsoring the Young Expert Panels. Wolfgang Ischinger and Jörg Rocholl (ESMT) are the patrons of this event.

The BDF is supported by an advisory council. In March 2014, Franz Müntefering replaced Ursula Lehr as chairman.

== Participants ==
Each year, 300 decision-makers participate in the Berlin Demography Forum. Some of those high-ranking participants include:

- Alain Berset
- Dominique Bertinotti
- Francesco Billari
- Carol M. Black
- M. Michele Burns
- Michèle Delaunay
- Michael Diekmann
- Markus Dröge
- Elsa Fornero
- Hermann Gröhe
- Yves Leterme
- Thomas de Maizière
- Åsa Regnér
- Bert Rürup
- Kristina Schröder
- Ursula Staudinger
- Rita Süssmuth
- Sven Voelpel

== Sources ==
- Deville, Volker; Ischinger, Wolfgang (2012). Global Demography: Generations and Their Future. Allianz SE. ISBN 978-3-00-038792-0.
