= BDF =

BDF or Bdf may refer to:

== Businesses and organisations ==
- Ballroom Dancers' Federation, a British organization for competitive ballroom dancers
- Banca Dacia Felix (Dacia Felix Bank), a defunct Romanian bank
- Beiersdorf AG, a multinational corporation based in Hamburg, Germany
- Banque de France (Bank of France), the French central bank
- Bund Deutscher Frauenvereine, a former German feminist organization

== Events ==
- Bates Dance Festival, a yearly dance festival held at Bates College, Maine, US
- Berlin Demography Forum, an annual conference

== Mathematics and units ==
- Backward differentiation formula, a numerical method for solving ordinary differential equations
- Board foot, unit of measure for volume of lumber

== People ==
- Bassirou Diomaye Faye (born 1980), president of Senegal

== Places ==
- Bedfordshire, a historic county in England, Chapman code
- Bois-des-Filion, Quebec, a town in Quebec, Canada

== Technology ==
- Building Distribution Frame, a type of distribution frame in telecommunications
- PCI BDF (bus/device/function), a range of configurable addresses in PCI configuration space
- Glyph Bitmap Distribution Format, a file format for storing bitmap fonts
- Bromo-DragonFLY, a psychedelic drug

== Military ==
- Bangladesh Forces, the combined forces of Bangladesh during its war of independence in 1971
- Bahrain Defense Force, the military of Bahrain
- Barbados Defence Force, the military of Barbados
- Belize Defence Force, the military of Belize
- Botswana Defence Force, the military of Botswana
