= TU Dresden =

Public university in Dresden, Germany

- Technische Universität Dresden
- Motto: The Collaborative University
- Type: Public
- Established: 1828; 198 years ago
- Academic affiliations: German Universities Excellence Initiative, PEGASUS, TIME, CESAER, TU9, DRESDEN-concept
- Budget: EUR 852 million (2024)
- President: Ursula Staudinger
- Academic staff: 5,600
- Administrative staff: 2,900
- Students: 29,000 (2024)
- Location: Dresden, Saxony, Germany; 51°1′41″N 13°43′36″E
- Campus: Urban
- Website: tu-dresden.de
- Location within Germany Location within Saxony

TU Dresden (German: Technische Universität Dresden, TUD), officially using the English name Dresden University of Technology, (Note: In 2023, TU Dresden defined "TUD Dresden University of Technology" as the full name for its international external presentation.) is a public research university in Dresden, Germany. It is the largest institute of higher education in the city of Dresden, the largest university in Saxony, and one of the 10 largest universities in Germany with 29,000 students as of 2024. TU Dresden has held the title of University of Excellence since 2012 and was confirmed in the German Excellence Strategy in 2019 and 2026.

The name Technische Universität Dresden has only been used since 1961; the history of the university, however, goes back nearly 200 years to 1828. This makes it one of the oldest colleges of technology in Germany, and one of the country's oldest universities, which in German today refers to institutes of higher education that cover the entire curriculum. The university is a member of TU9, a consortium of the nine leading German Institutes of Technology. The university has 17 faculties and offers 119 degree programs.

== History ==
TH Dresden in 1905

=== Early development ===
TU Dresden traces its origins to the Technical Educational Institute (Technische Bildungsanstalt), founded in Dresden in 1828 during the early phase of industrialization. It was established to train technical specialists in fields such as mechanics, mechanical engineering and ship construction. In 1871, the institution was renamed the Royal Saxon Polytechnic Institute (Königlich-Sächsisches Polytechnikum). In 1890, it became the Royal Saxon Technical College (Königlich Sächsische Technische Hochschule). In 1961, the institution received university status and its present name, Technische Universität Dresden.

=== 20th century ===
During the period of Nazi Germany, members of the university were affected by political and racial persecution. On 10 May 1933, books by Jewish authors and other writers regarded as politically undesirable by the Nazi regime were burned at the Bismarck Column on Dresden's Räcknitzhöhe. The event was organized by the Nazi-dominated German Student Union and was attended by students, professors and representatives of the university. Professors and former professors including Victor Klemperer, Harry Dember, Richard von Mises and Paul Tillich were dismissed, forced out of office or emigrated during this period.

After the Second World War, the university was located in the Soviet occupation zone and later in the German Democratic Republic. In 1961, the Technical College of Dresden was granted the status of a technical university; at that time, 10,741 students were enrolled. In 1968, the third university reform in the GDR fundamentally changed the structure of TU Dresden. Traditional institutes were abolished and 22 sections were created under stronger political influence. In 1986, the Dresden Engineering University (Ingenieurhochschule Dresden) was merged with TU Dresden; its traditions later contributed to the development of the Faculty of Computer Science.

=== After reunification ===
TUD – University of Excellence – Since 2012

After German reunification in 1990, TU Dresden underwent a major restructuring. New or reorganized faculties included Computer Science, Law, Education, Economics and Business Management, Transport and Traffic Sciences, Medicine, Civil Engineering and Architecture. The university also integrated parts of the "Friedrich List" College of Transport and Communications and prepared the establishment of the Faculty of Medicine Carl Gustav Carus.

In 2009, TU Dresden and non-university research institutions in Dresden agreed on the DRESDEN-concept alliance, together with institutes of the Max Planck Society, Fraunhofer Society, Helmholtz Association and Leibniz Association. The alliance was intended to create a common research and university education area in Dresden and to coordinate research priorities, graduate education and scientific infrastructure. In 2012, TU Dresden was selected as one of Germany's Universities of Excellence.

== Campus ==
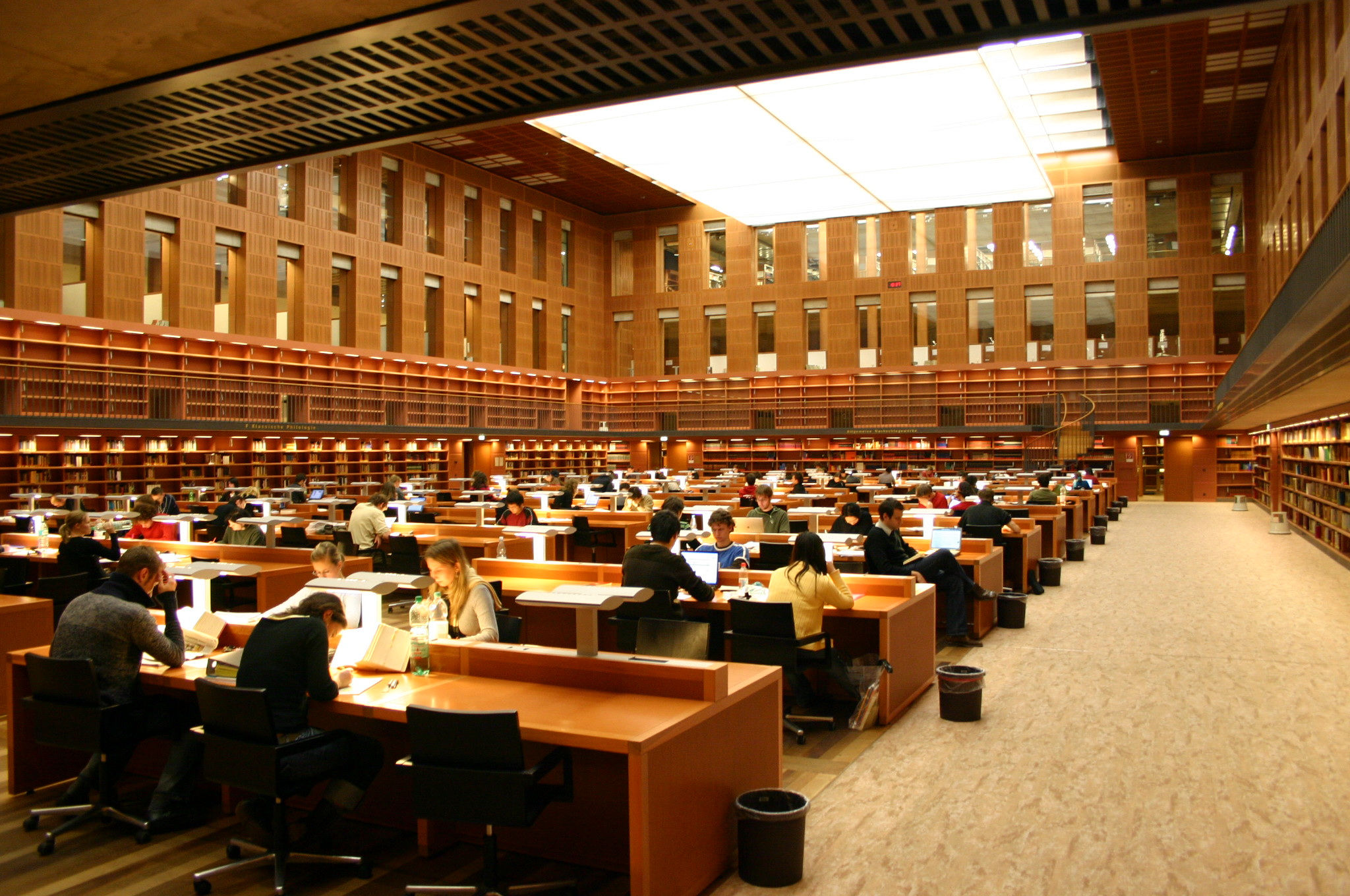
SLUB — Saxon State Library – Regional and University Library Dresden

TU Dresden is a campus university in most aspects. Some of its buildings are over a hundred years old (such as the buildings around Muenchner Platz square). The architecture of these buildings is mostly influenced by the art nouveau style or the Bauhaus school (e.g. the chemistry building Fritz-Foerster-Bau). In recent years, these historic buildings have been complemented by modern buildings (e.g. the library, the main auditorium, the biochemistry department, and the life sciences building).

The main campus, as well as the medical faculty and that of computer science, are all within the boundaries of the city of Dresden. The main campus is located south of the city center, mostly in the area bordered by Nöthnitzer Straße, Fritz-Förster-Platz and Münchner Platz; the medical faculty can be found in the Johannstadt district. The faculty of forestry, formerly the Royal Saxon Academy of Forestry, resides in a forest area in the nearby town of Tharandt.

== Organization ==
TU Dresden has 17 faculties, structured into 5 schools. Most faculties are located on the main campus south of the city center, except for the Faculty of Medicine, which has its own campus near the Elbe river East of the city center, and the Department of Forestry in Tharandt.

=== Science ===
The School of Science comprises five faculties: Biology, Chemistry and Food Chemistry, Mathematics, Physics, and Psychology. The faculties are all located on the main campus. In 2006, a new research building for the biology department opened. In October 2006, the Deutsche Forschungsgemeinschaft decided to fund a new graduate school, the Dresden International Graduate School for Biomedicine and Bioengineering and a so-called cluster of excellence From Cells to Tissues to Therapies.

=== Engineering ===
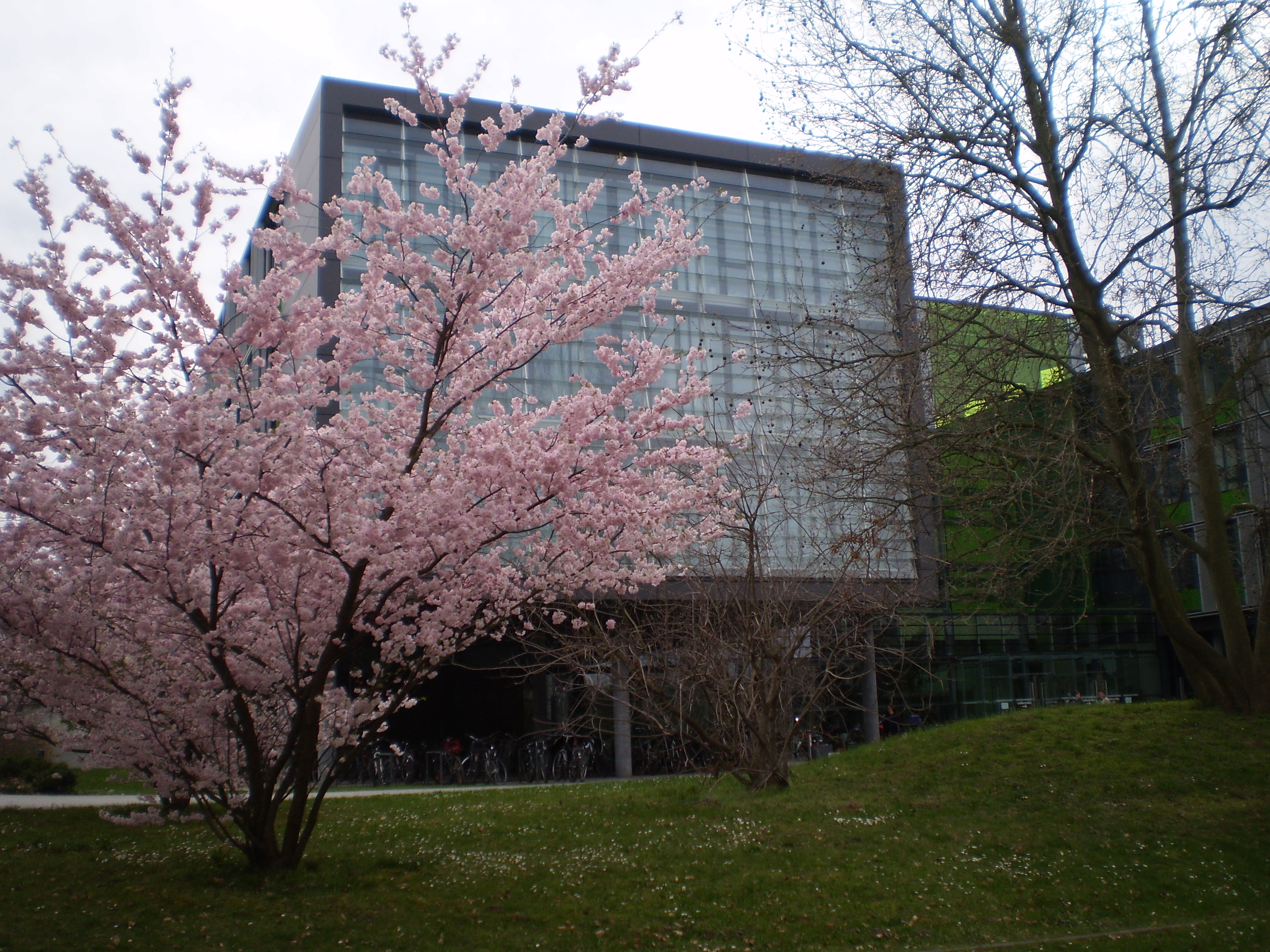
Building of the Faculty of Computer Science

The School of Engineering Sciences encompasses the faculties of Computer Engineering, Computer Sciences, and Mechanical Sciences and Engineering.

The school is the second largest in the university and is at the heart of the so-called Silicon Saxony in Dresden.

=== Humanities and Social Sciences ===
Technical University of Dresden – Building of the Faculty of Humanities

The School of Humanities and Social Sciences comprises the Faculty of Education, the Faculty of Arts, Humanities and Social Science, the Faculty of Linguistics, Literature and Cultural Studies

=== Civil and Environmental Engineering ===
The School of Civil and Environmental Engineering is the largest in the TU Dresden, encompassing the Faculty of Architecture and Landscape, the Faculty of Civil Engineering, the Faculty of Environmental Sciences, the Friedrich List Faculty of Transportation and Traffic Science, and the Faculty of Business and Economics.

=== Medicine ===
- The Carl Gustav Carus Faculty of Medicine has its own campus east of the city center near the Elbe river. The faculty has a partnership with Partners Harvard Medical International.

=== Research centers and affiliated institutes ===
TU Dresden has several central academic units and affiliated institutes. Its central academic units include the Center for Advancing Electronics Dresden (cfaed), the Center for Interdisciplinary Digital Sciences (CIDS), the Center for Molecular and Cellular Bioengineering (CMCB), the Center for Tactile Internet with Human-in-the-Loop (CeTI), the Cluster of Excellence Physics of Life (PoL), Climate-Neutral and Resource-Efficient Construction (CARE), and Responsible Electronics in the Climate Change Era (REC²).

CIDS brings together activities in high-performance computing, data analytics, artificial intelligence, and cloud and edge technologies. It includes, among others, the Center for Information Services and High Performance Computing (ZIH) and ScaDS.AI Dresden. CMCB combines the interdisciplinary institutes B CUBE, BIOTEC and CRTD in the life sciences.

Under the German Excellence Strategy, TU Dresden is involved in five Clusters of Excellence funded from January 2026: CeTI, ctd.qmat, PoL, CARE and REC². cfaed was previously funded as a Cluster of Excellence under the German Excellence Initiative and continues as a central academic unit of TU Dresden.

TU Dresden also cooperates with legally independent affiliated institutes. These include the Barkhausen Institute, Deutsches Baum-Institut, Dresden International University, the Hannah Arendt Institute for Totalitarianism Studies, the Institute for Doping Analysis and Sports Biochemistry, the Institute of Wood Technology Dresden, the Institute for Musical Instrument Making, Nanoelectronics Materials Lab, PTS – Institute for Fibers and Paper, the Structure and Materials Mechanics Research Institute, TUD Dresden University of Technology Institute of Advanced Studies, and the University Outpatient Clinic and Research Center for Psychotherapy.

== Research ==
TU Dresden's research profile is shaped by engineering, natural sciences, medicine, computer science and the humanities, as well as by its cooperation with non-university research institutes in Dresden. The university is part of the DRESDEN-concept alliance, which connects TU Dresden with research and cultural institutions in the city, including institutes of the Fraunhofer Society (five full institutes and six branches), Max Planck Society (Physics of Complex Systems MPI-PKS, Molecular Cell Biology and Genetics MPI-CBG and Chemical Physics of Solids MPI-CPfS), Leibniz Association (three institues: Leibniz IOER of Ecological Urban and Regional Development, Leibniz IFW for Solid State and Materials Research and Leibniz IPF of Polymer Research) and Helmholtz Association through the Helmholtz-Zentrum Dresden-Rossendorf, which houses among other facilities the Dresden High Magnetic Field Laboratory and ELBE synchrotron.

As of 2026, TU Dresden is involved in five Clusters of Excellence funded under the German Excellence Strategy: CeTI – Centre for Tactile Internet with Human-in-the-Loop, ctd.qmat – Complexity, Topology and Dynamics in Quantum Matter, PoL – Physics of Life, CARE – Climate-Neutral and Resource-Efficient Construction, and REC² – Responsible Electronics in the Climate Change Era.

=== Digital sciences and computer science ===
TU Dresden has expanded its activities in computer science, artificial intelligence, data science and high-performance computing. Its Center for Interdisciplinary Digital Sciences (CIDS) brings together work in high-performance computing, data analytics, artificial intelligence, cloud and edge technologies, and digital transformation across disciplines. CIDS includes NHR@TUD, one of Germany's National High Performance Computing Centers, and ScaDS.AI Dresden/Leipzig, a national competence center for scalable data analytics and artificial intelligence. According to TU Dresden, the university was ranked fourth in computer science in the DFG Funding Atlas 2024. The Faculty of Computer Science comprises six institutes and 30 professorships, with research topics ranging from software and systems engineering to AI, visual computing, data management, cybersecurity and human-computer interaction.

=== Life sciences, biotechnology and medicine ===
The university has a long-standing research focus in life sciences and biomedical engineering, supported by institutions such as the Center for Molecular and Cellular Bioengineering (CMCB), the Center for Regenerative Therapies Dresden (CRTD), the Biotechnology Center (BIOTEC) and B CUBE. These units connect research in molecular bioengineering, cell biology, regenerative medicine, biophysics and bioinformatics. The Cluster of Excellence PoL – Physics of Life investigates the physical principles underlying the organization of living matter, combining experimental, theoretical and computational approaches.

=== Engineering, materials and microelectronics ===
Research in engineering and materials science includes construction materials, microelectronics, quantum materials, robotics and transport systems. The Cluster of Excellence CARE focuses on climate-neutral and resource-efficient construction, while REC² investigates more sustainable electronics for the climate-change era. The Dresden–Würzburg Cluster of Excellence ctd.qmat conducts research on complexity, topology and dynamics in quantum matter, linking physics, chemistry and materials science.

TU Dresden is also embedded in the regional microelectronics ecosystem around Silicon Saxony. Research in this area includes semiconductor technologies, electronic materials, integrated systems and the environmental sustainability of electronics.

=== Mobility, tactile internet and transport ===
Transport and mobility research is represented by the "Friedrich List" Faculty of Transport and Traffic Sciences and by collaborations with institutes such as the Fraunhofer Institute for Transportation and Infrastructure Systems. The Cluster of Excellence CeTI – Centre for Tactile Internet with Human-in-the-Loop investigates real-time interaction between humans and machines, with applications including robotics, telepresence, immersive collaboration, healthcare and AI-supported assistance systems.

== Rankings ==
University rankings

Overall – Global & National
QS World 2026	218	13
THE World 2026	174	16
ARWU World 2025	201–300	12–21

TU Dresden is recognized in several university ranking systems. In the QS World University Rankings 2026, the university is ranked 218th globally and 13th nationally. The Times Higher Education World University Rankings 2026 places it 174th globally and 16th in Germany. In the ARWU 2025, TU Dresden is ranked in the 201–300 range globally and 12th–21st nationally.

According to the 2019 QS Engineering and Technology Ranking, the university ranked 113th worldwide and 5th in Germany. According to the 2019 Times Higher Education World University Rankings, the university ranked 90th worldwide in engineering and technology. According to Reuters, the university was ranked 79th in the list of the world's most innovative universities in 2019.

The Eduniversal Business Schools ranking ranks the university's Faculty of Business and Economics with 3 out of 5 palmes of excellence. According to the university ranking 2016 of the German business magazine Wirtschaftswoche, the university ranked 7th in Germany in computer science and mechanical engineering and 6th in Germany in business informatics and engineering management. The university did not take first place in any of the ranked subjects: Business Administration, Business informatics, Engineering management, Natural Sciences, Computer Science, Electrical Engineering, Mechanical Engineering and Economics.

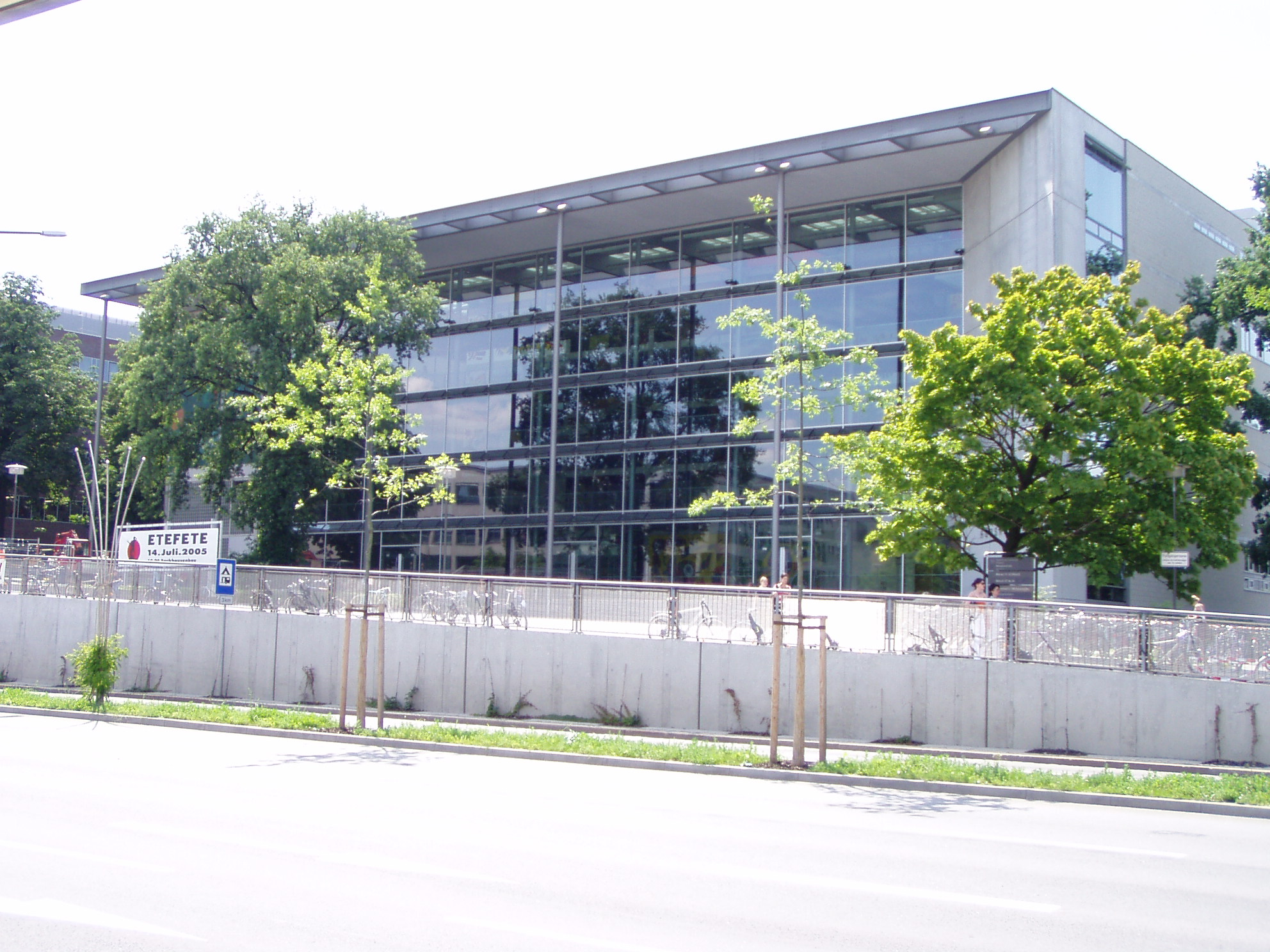
The main auditorium

== International Cooperations ==
TU Dresden's strategic partnerships include cross-campus collaborations with King's College London and the Indian Institute of Technology Madras, as well as the developing partnership with ETH Zurich. The university also participates in cross-border partnerships with universities and regional partners in Poland and the Czech Republic.

TU Dresden has been a member of the EUTOPIA University Alliance since 2021, a network of ten European universities collaborating in education, research, and mobility. It also maintains partnerships with universities outside Europe, including institutions in Africa, Asia, the Americas, and Australia.

== Student life ==
=== General ===
Out of 2024's 29,000 students, 27% were enrolled in the School of Civil and Environmental Engineering, 25% studied Engineering Sciences, 12% Natural Sciences and Mathematics, 11% Medicine, and 10% Humanities and Social Sciences. The remaining 15% of students were enrolled in teacher training programs.

In the 2022–2023 cohort, roughly 45% of the student body originated from Saxony, 20% (6,626) from other Eastern German federal states, 18% (4,306) from the Western German federal states, and 17% (3,442) from other countries.

Of the students from Saxony, the cohort was roughly evenly split between students from Dresden (14.7%), the Dresden metro area (15.5%), and from other parts of Saxony (14.5%).

The origin of the students is based on the location where the A-level exams have been completed.

=== International students ===
In 2024, 20% of the student body was represented by international students from 128 different countries. The school participates in the Erasmus program. The language of instruction for most courses is German, with the exception of the university's 26 English-language degrees. To prepare for admissions to the university, many foreign students attend German language courses at the university-affiliated language school TUDIAS-Sprachschule.

The university's International Office is responsible for handling international applications and has information for prospective students.

A number of activities for international students facilitates their integration and help students to find new friends. Most notably the Erasmus-Initiative TU Dresden offers many group activities throughout the semester which are open to all students (not only to Erasmus participants). A student-run program, the LinkPartnerProgramm matches every interested international student with a German student, to help them with questions arising during the first weeks, be it regarding course registration or any other issue students might have.

=== Leisure activities ===
Sports are popular among the TUD students, with 871 courses in over 60 different sports at the Dresden University Sports Center. With thirteen student clubs, Dresden is considered the unofficial student club capital of Germany.

=== Performing arts ensembles ===
Among the many groups at the TU Dresden are four major ensembles. These four include the theater group Die Bühne, which has a small ensemble directed by professionals, and the folk dance group Folkloretanzensemble Thea-Maass which is dedicated to reviving regional styles of dance. The last two groups are the largest by far and these are the university choir and the university orchestra, both having student and non-student members of all ages. In 1997 a part of the university orchestra branched off into a chamber ensemble, becoming the TU-Kammerphilharmonie, and since it consists almost exclusively of students the ensemble rehearses and performs only during the academic year. Each of these major ensembles performs an average of one to four times per semester. These performances often take place in Saxony but also occasionally internationally.

== Funding ==
The university is currently developing new strategies to make itself more independent from state funding and decision-making. The TU Dresden is third strongest successful university in Germany in terms of third-party funding, highlighting its ability to secure funding from industry partners. In 2004, 3,564 projects were financed with 104.1 million Euros from outside sources (other than state funds). It has one of the highest shares of income by industry partnerships.

== Points of interest ==
- Botanischer Garten der Technischen Universität Dresden, the university's botanical garden
- Forstbotanischer Garten Tharandt, the university's historic arboretum
- Archives of the university

== Notable people ==
=== Honorary doctors ===
- 1905 Wilhelm von Siemens – Industrialist
- 1906 Ferdinand von Zeppelin – Lieutenant general and airship pioneer
- 1928 Heinrich Rickert – Philosopher
- 1928 Fredrik Ljungström – Engineer and inventor
- 1981 Konrad Zuse – Civil engineer and computer scientist who built the world's first programmable computer
- 1987 Karl Reinisch – Engineer
- 1989 Kurt A. Körber – Entrepreneur who founded Körber Group
- 1990 Günther Landgraf – Physicist, rector of TU Dresden from 1990 to 1994
- 1995 Václav Havel – Writer, dissident and first president of the Czech Republic
- 1999 Kofi Annan – Former United Nations Secretary-General
- 2002 Walter Kohn – Physicist, recipient of the 1998 Nobel Prize in Chemistry
- 2024 Richard Socher – Computer scientist and entrepreneur

=== Honorary senators ===
- 1997 Günther Landgraf – Rector of TU Dresden 1990–1994
- 2000 Günter Blobel – Recipient of the 1999 Nobel Prize in Physiology or Medicine

=== Faculty ===
- Manfred von Ardenne – Physics
- Heinrich Barkhausen (1911–1953; not continuously) – Communications technology. Discoverer of the Barkhausen jumps, a manifestation of domain wall movement in magnets.
- Alfred Baeumler (1924–1933) – Nazi-philosopher and educationalist
- Kurt Beyer – Civil engineering
- Manfred Buchroithner — Cartography
- Adolf Busemann – Aerodynamics
- Carl Gustav Carus – Medicine
- Gerhard Fettweis – Engineering
- Klaus Fuchs – Nuclear technology, soviet spy
- Hanns Bruno Geinitz – Geology
- Gustav Kafka (1923–1934) – Psychology
- Victor Klemperer (1920–1935) – Professor for romance studies; He wrote "LTI", an analysis of the Nazi's language, and detailed dairies during the Nazi time.
- Richard Kroner (1924–1928) – Philosopher (Religion)
- Luise Krüger – Athlete
- Günther Landgraf – Physics, first freely elected rector of TUD
- Nikolaus Joachim Lehmann (1940–1998) – Mathematician, professor, first lectures in informatics in the GDR 1967
- Wilhelm Gotthelf Lohrmann – Astronomer, Geodete
- Richard von Mises – Mathematician, professor for hydro- and aerodynamics
- Maria Reiche – Mathematician, archaeologist and technical translator
- Roland Scholl (1918–1934) – Chemist; director of the institute for organic chemistry
- Wilhelm Steinkopf (1919–1940) – Chemist
- A. Francis Stewart (b. 1956) – Biochemist and emeritus senior professor
- Paul Tillich (1925–1929) – Philosopher (religion)
- Gustav Zeuner – Engineer

=== Alumni ===
- Afroz Ahmad
- Carl Theodor Albrecht – Surveyor
- Fritz Bleyl – (Architecture) Architect and painter of expressionism
- Kwong-Chai Chu (朱光彩) – Chinese hydraulic engineer who received his CIE (Chinese Institute of Engineers) Award in 1947
- Carl Enckell – (Mechanical Engineering) Finnish politician
- Erik von Frenckell – (Engineering) a sports administrator, member of IOC and vice president of FIFA
- Steffen Heidrich – (Business Management) Former footballer
- Rudolph Hering – (Civil Engineering)
- Katja Kipping – Chairwoman of German Left Party
- Max Littmann – (Civil engineering) Architect
- Ingrid Mertig – Materials scientist and institute professor
- Reimund Neugebauer – (Mechanical Engineering) Designated President of Fraunhofer Society
- Theodor Pallady – Romanian painter
- Evgeny Paton – (Engineering) Ukrainian
- Ernst Otto Schlick – (Engineering) Shipbuilding engineer
- Herbert Seifert – Mathematician
- Johannes Paul Thilman – (Science of Culture) Composer
- Stanislaw Tillich – (Mechanical Engineering) Minister-President of Saxony
- Eckhard Platen – Mathematician
- Oliver Wehner – Politician
- Jan Józef Werewka – Information scientist
