= Jan Józef Werewka =

- Born: May 1, 1948 (age 78) Jasień, Poland

Professor of technical sciences
- Alma mater: Dresden University of Technology
- Ph.D.: AGH University of Mining and Metallurgy (now AGH University of Science and Technology)
- Habilitation: Humboldt University of Berlin

Academic teacher
- University: AGH University of Science and Technology

Notable awards
- Medal from the Commission of National Education

Jan Józef Werewka (born May 1, 1948 in Jasień) – a Polish information scientist, professor of AGH University of Science and Technology, and a CEO of IT companies. His main interests include project management and IT architecture solutions.

== Biography ==
He completed primary and secondary education in Brzesko. In 1971, he defended his master’s thesis entitled Measurement of electrons mobility in amorphous semiconductors at the Dresden University of Technology and received a M.Sc. degree in electronic data processing. In 1974, he completed a doctoral program at the Electrical Engineering Department of the AGH University of Mining and Metallurgy in Kraków. The doctoral thesis that was defended in 1975 pertained to the computer in-house transportation model. In 1989, he defended his habilitation thesis on Distributed simulation of communication systems at the Humboldt University of Berlin in the Faculty of Mathematics and Natural Sciences. Since 1998, he has been an associate professor of AGH University of Science and Technology. Currently, he works at the Department of Applied Computer Science in the Faculty of Electrical Engineering, Automatics, Computer Science and Engineering in Biomedicine. Since 2009, he has been the head of postgraduate studies on IT Project Management. In 2006, he received a medal from the Commission of National Education (pl:Medal Komisji Edukacji Narodowej).

He is the CEO and one of the co-founders of ATSI S.A., an IT company founded in 1997. In the Puls Biznesu ranking of 500 Managers in 2013, he was listed in the 153rd position. The ATSI S.A. company employs over 250 professionals from various fields and was awarded the Gepardy Biznesu award in 2010 and the Business Gazelles (pl:Gazele Biznesu) award in 2009 and 2011. In 2014, the company was listed in the 1st position in the Forbes Diamonds ranking list of the companies with the most dynamic growth tendency in the Malopolska region and in the 14th place in Poland.

His current area of didactic and scientific activity pertains to the IT project management and the development of architecture, software and IT products in a synergical manner that takes into consideration the needs of different stakeholders, particularly higher education institutions, companies developing software and companies using the developed software.

== Selected publications ==
- Werewka, J.: Distributed systems of control and data acquisition. Programmable drivers and field buses. CCATIE – Cracow Centre for Advanced Training in Information Engineering, Kraków, 1998. (in Polish)
- Werewka, J.: Programming computer hardware for automaticians. AGH Script No. 1514, Kraków, 1998. (in Polish)
- Piórkowski, A. and Werewka, J.: Minimization of the total completion time for asynchronous transmission in a pocket data-transmission system. International Journal of Applied Mathematics and Computer Science. Vol. 20, No. 2, 2010, pp. 391–399.
- Werewka, J. and Dach, M.: Response–time analysis of a CAN network used for supervisory control and diagnostic systems. Control and Cybernetics, Vol. 39, No. 4, 2010, pp. 1135–1157.
- Werewka, J.: Designing systems simulation – the simulation of discrete event systems. AGH Script No. 1150, Kraków, 1989. (in Polish)
- Werewka, J., Lewicka, D. and Zakrzewska-Bielawska, A.: Project management in IT company. Vol. 1. Methodology and management strategy. AGH University of Science and Technology Press, Kraków, 2012. (in Polish)
- Werewka, J., Tadeusiewicz, R., Rogus, G. and Skrzyński, P.: Project management in IT company. Vol. 2. Company knowledge acquisition and business modelling. AGH University of Science and Technology Press, Kraków, 2012. (in Polish)
- Werewka, J., Nalepa, G.J, Turek, M., Włodarek, T., Bobek, S. and Kaczor, K.: Project management in IT company. Vol. 3. Project and software development process management. AGH University of Science and Technology Press, Kraków, 2012. (in Polish)
- Rogus, G., Skrzyński, P., Szwed, P., Turek, M. and Werewka, J.: SMESDaD – synergetic methodology for enterprise software development and deployment. Journal: Pomiary Automatyka Robotyka, No. 12, Kraków, 2011, pp. 196–209. (in Polish)
