= Demographic change in Germany =

Demographic change in Germany (German: Demografischer Wandel in Deutschland) is a collective term for various changes and trends in population development in Germany. The term is often used synonymously with the term demographic transition.

The changes affect such factors as:

- the age structure of the population,
- the quantitative ratio of men and women on the population pyramid,
- the proportions of people with and without German citizenship, as well as naturalized citizens, in the population,
- the development of birth rates and death rates,
- The rates of immigrants and emigrants.

The effects of demographic change on the individual federal states and municipalities vary by jurisdiction.

Due to demographic change, the population of Germany has been ageing for 50 years. The number of young people in Germany has sharply declined. In 2020, the population flatlined for the first time in a decade. As of the end of 2024, the population of Germany stood at just under 83.6 million, an increase of 121,000 compared to the previous year.

== Factors ==
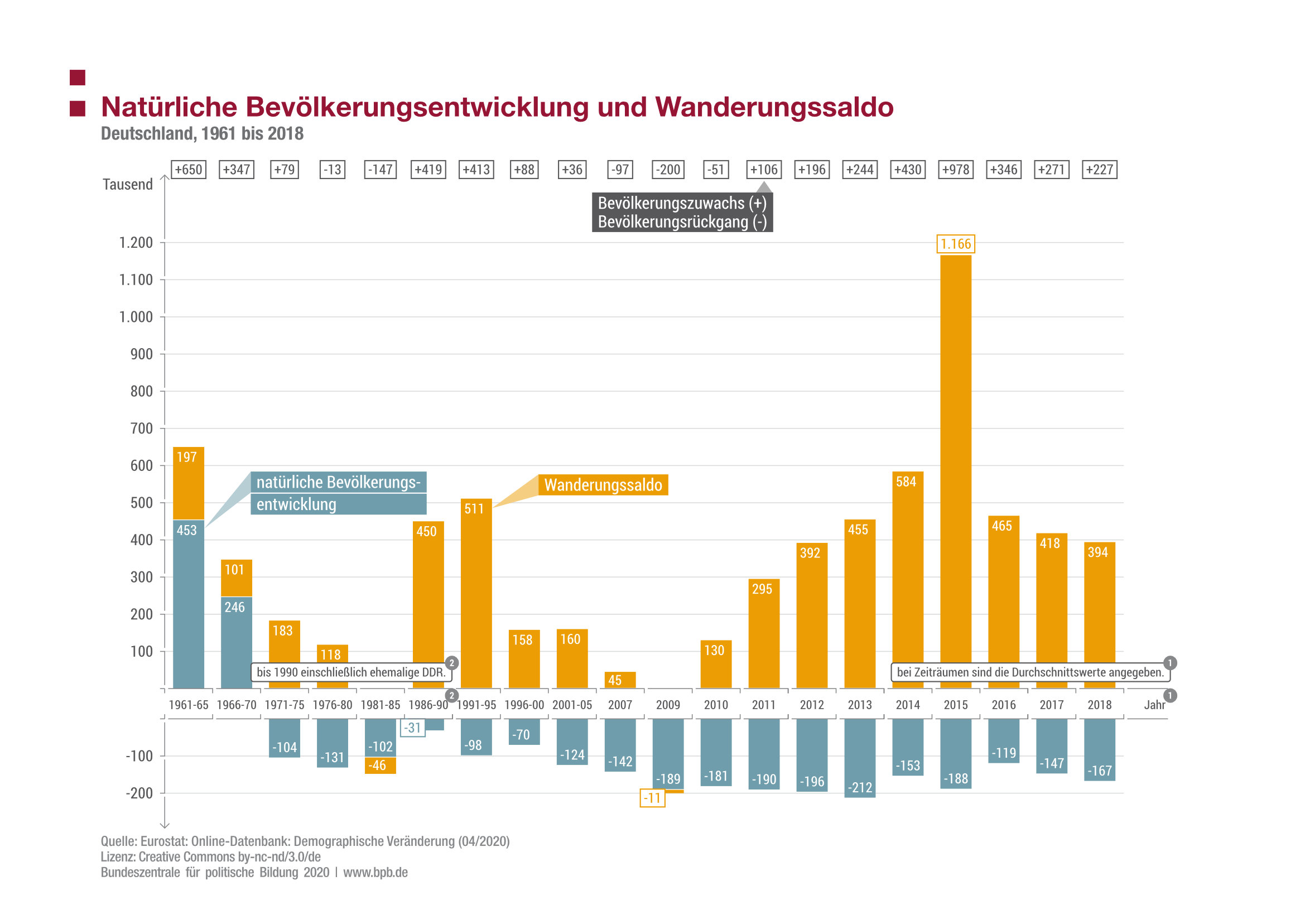
Table showing population trends and net migration. Source: Eurostat: Online database: Demographic change (04/2020). License: cc by-nc-nd/3.0/de/.

- In Germany, the aging structure is characterized by the fact that since 1973 the death rate (mortality) has been higher than the birth rate (see also demographic transition).
- Due to the higher life expectancy of the population and a simultaneously declining birth rate, the proportion of older people is increasing compared to the proportion of younger people (see also age structure in Germany).
- The proportion of families with three or more children has declined significantly. This explains 68% of the overall decline in births. A further 26% can be attributed to increased childlessness.
- Although the rate of immigration has steadily declined over the past two decades, it remains positive. Following the introduction of freedom of movement in the labour market for workers from the newly acceded member states of the European Union in 2011, an average annual net migration of between 147,000 and 311,000 people is expected until 2060. Foreign nationals immigrating to Germany are, on average, younger than those emigrating. This results in a "rejuvenation effect" for the population remaining in Germany, but this does not counteract the overall aging of the population. The 15th coordinated population forecast, assumptions, and results include the Covid-19 pandemic and the Russian invasion of Ukraine on February 24, 2022, as significant changes.
- Emigration. In absolute terms – that is, irrespective of citizenship – 734,000 people emigrated from Germany in 2009. In the same period, 721,000 migrated to Germany. Of these, 606,000 were not German citizens.

== Effects ==
Video: Demographic change in Germany and its effects (1:38 min)

The effects of demographic change present legislators, municipalities, welfare organizations, businesses, and citizens with new challenges. For example, (pre-)schools, especially primary schools, must be merged with each other if the investment in education per student is not to increase. Furthermore, the ever-growing proportion of elderly people means that their mobility must be guaranteed. and their care must also be provided. This can be supported, for example, by converting old government buildings into retirement homes and/or assisted living facilities.

=== Retirement provision ===
The statutory pension insurance system for workers and employees in Germany is fundamentally organized according to the pay-as-you-go system. However, the costs associated with aging are also covered by government subsidies for the pension insurance, company pensions, and private retirement savings. Demographic trends, characterized by an aging population and a shrinking younger population, mean that, with the retirement age staying the same, a growing number of pensioners will face a decreasing number of contributors to the statutory pension insurance system unless the number of employees subject to compulsory insurance within the overall working-age population is increased. Based on this premise, advocates of reform are calling for raising the retirement age, reducing public pensions and increasing private retirement savings, for example through private insurance and stocks, in order to prevent a looming pension gap.

However, the number of employed persons subject to compulsory insurance and the amount of their total contributions are not solely dependent on population trends. Therefore, trade unions in particular, but also individual academics such as Gerd Bosbach and political commentators such as Albrecht Müller, criticize policy concepts that focus exclusively on the demographic factor and ignore all others. According to these critics, these concepts primarily serve to relieve the burden on employers.

Critics of the “dramatization of demographic development” argue that the number of employees subject to compulsory insurance, or the contribution payments that determine the pension amount, can also be increased by an increase in the number of full-time employed persons or the total number of employed persons. Besides raising the retirement age, the following factors play a role in this:

- the increased (full) employment of women and underemployed men
- the reduction of unemployment,
- the mobilization of the hidden labour reserve
- the earlier start of employment,
- the inclusion of civil servants and self-employed individuals in the group of contributors
- the integration of immigrants into the labour market

The contribution payment can be increased not only by increasing the contribution rate, but also by:

- the exclusion of financing non-contribution-related external services such as non-insurance-related services
- the increase in the proportionate insurance contributions due to the rise in gross incomes in parallel with productivity development and economic growth
- The increase in the proportion of insurance contributions due to more permanent positions, full-time contracts, fewer bogus self-employed persons, less precarious employment and more standard employment relationships.

Furthermore, according to Gerd Bosbach, the decline in the number of children and young people also results in cost savings, because in a population with a high proportion of children and young people, significant expenditures must be made for them, which tend to decrease with a lower youth population. The burden on the working population lies not only in old-age provision, but also in the care of children, adolescents, and young adults in school, vocational training, and university studies. When considering this burden, all areas must be taken into account, not just old-age provision.

The fact that employed persons subject to compulsory insurance have to support an increasing number of non-working people entitled to pensions is not a new phenomenon:

- From 1900 to 1990, the proportion of the population over 65 years of age steadily tripled from 4.9% to 14.9%.
- while the proportion of those under 20 years of age halved.
- Life expectancy increased from 45 years for men to 76 in 2002.
- The retirement age (Renteneintrittsalter) decreased from 70 to 65 years (from 1911 onwards).
- The number of employed persons doubled between 1955 and 2014 due to increased female employment and growing precarious employment.
- GDP tripled in real terms between 1960 and 2005.
- According to the Federal Statistical Office, overall workforce productivity per employed person in Germany increased by 22.7% between 1991 and 2011. Labor productivity per hour worked increased by 34.48%. This reflects the simultaneous decrease of 7.5% in the average number of hours worked per employed person.

These extreme changes were managed without altering the pension insurance system; in fact, pensions were dynamically adjusted to income increases, and the pension entitlements of all employees of the former GDR and of immigrant resettlers and late repatriates were adopted (Foreign Pensions Act).

Furthermore, critics point out that predictions have never been possible over long periods.

The negative prognosis also implies that all current and all possible family policy measures aimed at increasing the birth rate, or all measures aimed at integrating immigrants, are doomed to failure from the outset. These are prerequisites that are not addressed, critically reflected upon, or justified. Regarding reproductive behavior, the example of France, with its significant increase in the birth rate, shows that attributing low birth rates solely to the modernity of society is not valid. Crucial factors include job security, standard employment, and a child-friendly social environment that highly values family life and children.

In 2016, the Swiss economist Thomas Straubhaar also presented the critique of the “demographic myths”, in particular criticizing what he considered to be erroneous notions of skilled worker shortages, child poverty and the advantages of immigration.

As with the pension insurance system, demographic changes are expected to have a negative impact on the current (as of 2024) German healthcare system. This applies, on the one hand, to long-term care insurance, which must prepare for an increasing number of elderly people requiring care, while the number of employees working in the care sector is declining. On the other hand, the expenditures of health insurance will also rise considerably, since the per capita healthcare costs for people beyond working age are several times higher than those of an average young person or working adult. The problems of health and long-term care insurance are thus essentially the same as those of the pension insurance system.

The shortage of doctors in rural areas (Landarzt) is likely to worsen, as 42% of general practitioners will retire by 2021 and young doctors prefer to practice in cities.

=== Property prices ===
Financial mathematician Andreas Beck suspects that due to demographic change, more properties will come onto the market from 2025 onwards, while demand will decrease.

At the same time, it can still be assumed that demographic change in Germany will have very different effects on real estate prices. Not only are younger generations increasingly drawn towards urban centres, causing significant increases in both purchase and rental prices there.

At the same time, the large real estate generations of the baby boomers are expected to reduce their own living space in old age, which could increase the supply of larger properties, especially in rural regions and small towns, and lead to a price decline.

=== Integration challenges ===
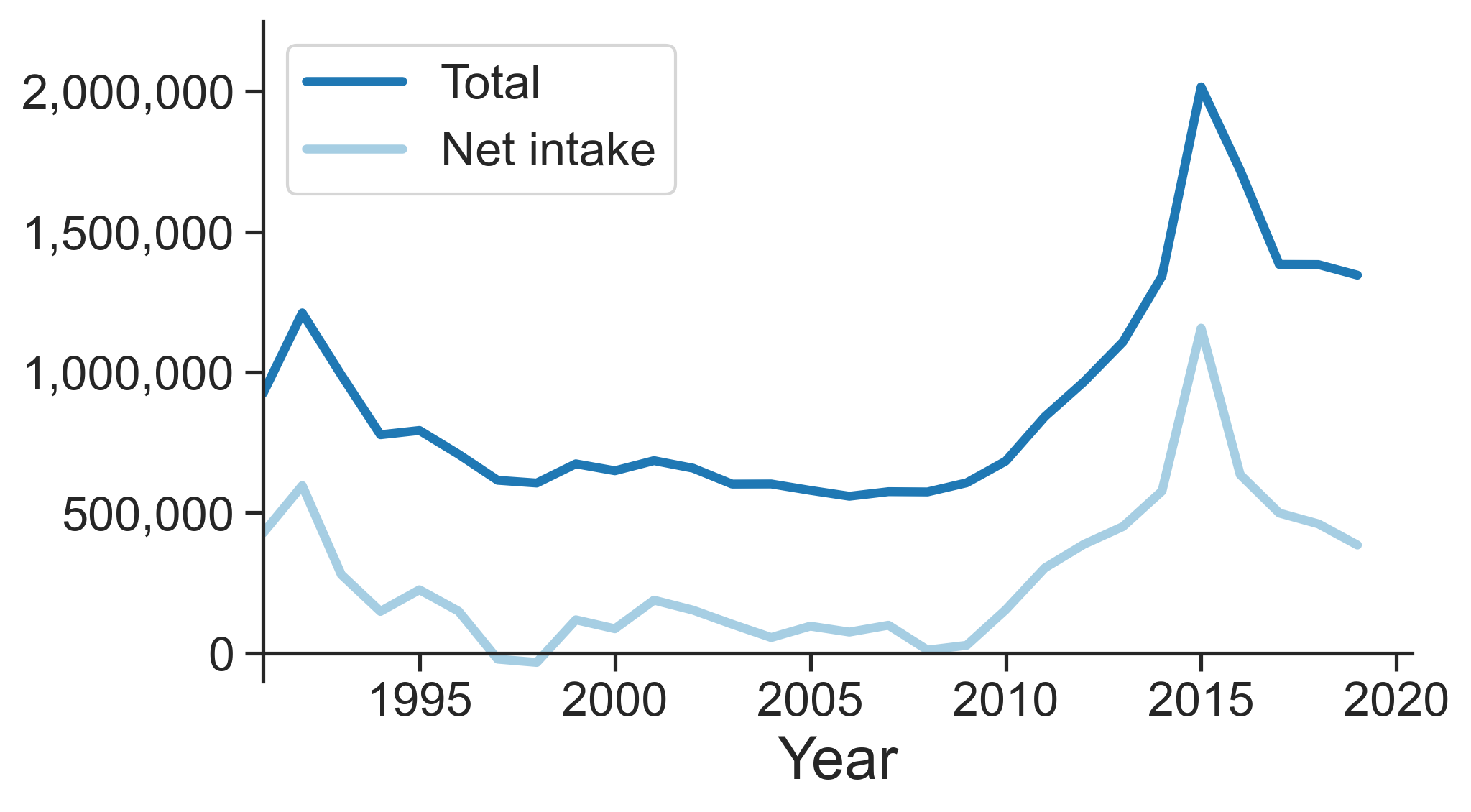
Graph showing the total number of immigrants moving to Germany annually. The integration of immigrants is the responsibility of the Federal Ministry of Labour and Social Affairs.

According to the 2011 census, 6 million foreigners and another 9 million Germans with a migration background live in Germany. This multi-ethnic segment of society represents 19% of the total population and is expected to grow further in the coming decades. Migrants primarily live in the major cities and metropolitan areas of the former West Germany. In 2007, the cities with high proportions of migrants were Frankfurt am Main (42%), Augsburg (40%), Nuremberg (38%), and Stuttgart (37%). In these cities, 57–68% of children under six years old had at least one parent with a migration background. The following four countries of origin accounted for the largest share of migrants in Germany in 2011 (in order of frequency): Turkey, the former Yugoslavia, Italy, and Poland. Migrants in Germany face relatively poor life prospects. While 6% of Germans rely on social welfare benefits, the figure for foreigners is 15%. This gap is more pronounced in Germany than in its European neighbours. The acceptance of migrants among the West German population has steadily increased in recent decades. In 2010, two-thirds of migrants reported experiencing no discrimination at work or with government agencies. Three-quarters of respondents felt the same about their neighbourhoods. The number of people who consider themselves xenophobic in West Germany decreased from 24% to 22% between 2002 and 2012. In East Germany, it rose from 30% to 38% during the same period. Due to the aging and shrinking population, Germany relies on immigration. Integration remains an ongoing task to enable people with a migration background to participate fully in economic, social, cultural, and political life.

== Measures ==
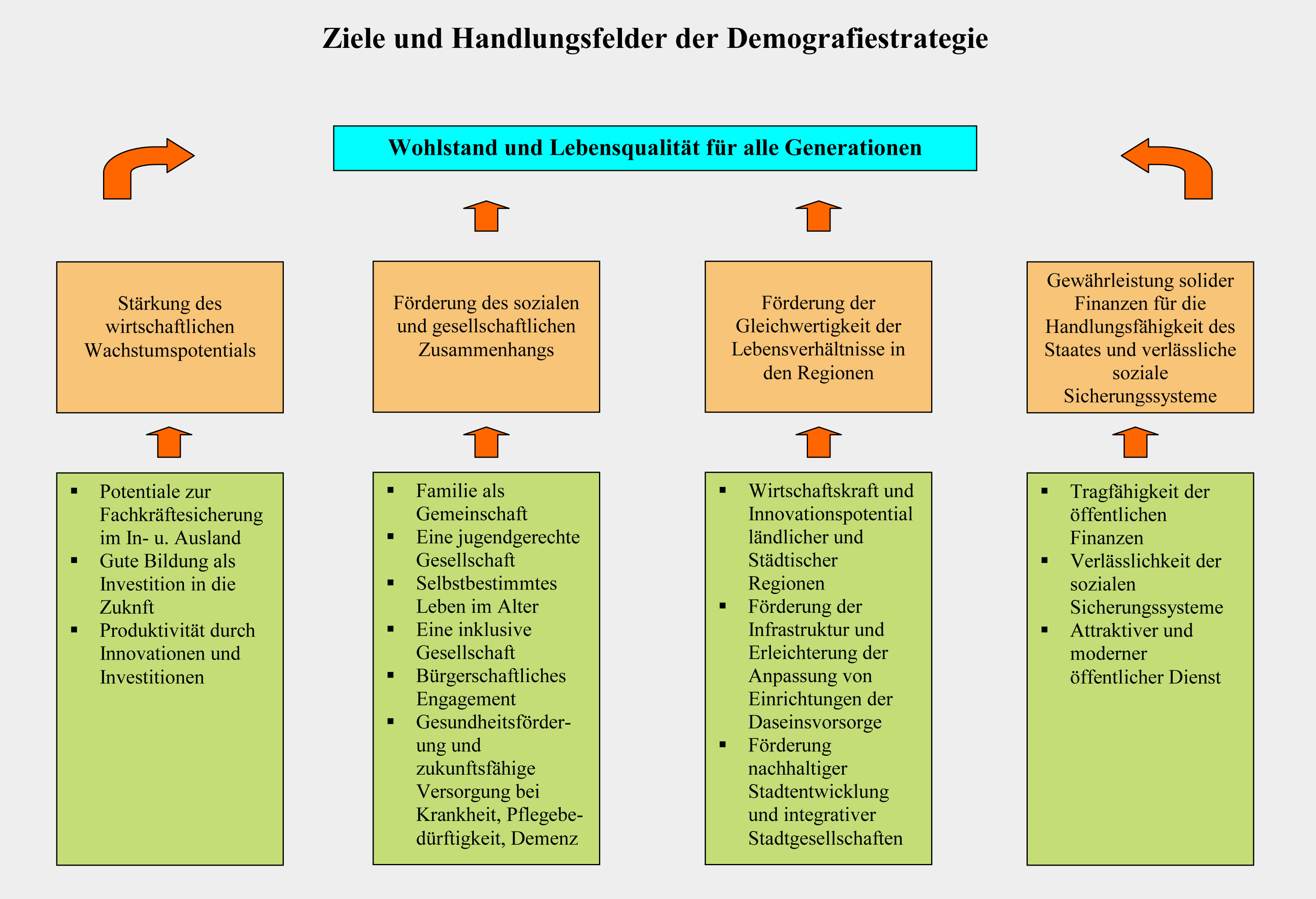
Presentation of the demographic goals and areas of action 2022

From 1992 to 2004, the German Bundestag had an Commission of Inquiry on Demographic Change, which compiled and assessed population development data for the Bundestag, examining the resulting societal, economic, and social impacts on all generations. It then developed recommendations for political decisions.

In 2009, the German Federal Government decided to develop a demographic strategy, and a demographic summit was held in 2012. Working groups were formed, and the motto since then has been: "Every age counts".

The following strategic goals are being pursued:

- strengthen the economic growth potential
- to promote social and societal cohesion
- to promote equal living conditions in the regions
- Ensure sound finances – for the ability of the state to act and the reliability of social security systems

=== Municipal demographic policy ===
Cities and municipalities began to develop strategic concepts and politically agreed goals regarding the potential consequences of demographic change. Maintaining a balanced generational ratio is to be achieved through municipal family policy activities. Municipal infrastructure must take into account the increasing proportion of older people.

In 2004, the city of Bielefeld became the first municipality in Germany to establish a staff unit for demographic development planning within the mayor's office, ensuring that population trends were considered in all municipal planning. The tasks of the demographics officer Susanne Tatje include, among other things, drawing attention to the aspect of demographic development in future decisions across all departments and developing and updating a concept for the city.

The city of Langenfeld has been managing the effects of demographic change since 2002. Over the past 12 years, at the instigation of First Deputy Mayor and Demographics Officer Marion Prell, the Langenfeld City Council addressed the management implications of demographic change in Langenfeld in three fundamental decisions: in 2003, 2007, and 2010. While initial activities focused primarily on older citizens (establishment of a "senior-friendly town hall" in 2004, founding of the Seniors Network in 2004, founding of the Dementia Network in 2005, establishment of a volunteer agency under municipal sponsorship in 2005, founding of a seniors' fair in 2006, and many others), since 2007 the management mechanisms have been developed and implemented in an interdisciplinary and intergenerational manner. The strict division into departments has been abandoned in the area of demographic-related matters. All administrative and policy areas are coordinated, aligned, and managed by a central coordination office. The areas of activity range from urban development, construction, transportation, mobility, culture, and education to the business areas of children/youth/family/schools/sports, and finally to actual social and senior citizen affairs. Within the framework of the "Young...Alternative" project, nearly 100 partner organizations are developing intergenerational programs. Since 2013, the development of the six districts has been the focus under the heading of "neighborhood development." Following the desire, evident from several population surveys, to remain in their familiar living environment for as long as possible, the principle of "outpatient before inpatient care" is to be put into practic.

=== Study programme on demographic change ===
The University of Rostock offers a Master's program in Demography as well as a doctoral program in Demographic Change in cooperation with the Max Planck Institute for Demographic Research. Students in the Master's programs in Demography, Sociology, and Economics have the option of taking courses in the doctoral program during their Master's studies and having their Master's thesis credited as a proposal for their planned dissertation (integrated doctoral pathway).

Since 2009 , the Integrated Gerontology program has existed at the University of Stuttgart, which explicitly addresses all facets of demographic change. This part-time Master's program combines gerontological issues with engineering, social science, and behavioral science content. With the help of this continuing education program, funded by the Ministry of Science, Research and the Arts of Baden-Württemberg the University of Stuttgart seeks to address the problems of demographic change at an early stage. The interdisciplinarity created through the participation of numerous institutes and the Robert Bosch Hospital ensures that graduates can provide holistic solutions for a wide range of fields, from politics and administration to tourism, media, retail, and human resource management.

The Master's program in Social Sustainability and Demographic Change is offered by Fachhochschule Dortmund.

=== Student project in Bavaria ===
In about a quarter of the 71 districts of Bavaria, the project "Population Development of My Community" has taken root, examining demographic change at the municipal level. Students from all types of schools are involved in the project. Under guidance, the students create population forecasts for their own community over the next 25 years and present them to the local council. The municipal results and the district-wide results (the sum of the municipal results) are then displayed on the district's website. The Hof district was the first to post the results on its website.

=== Governance ===
With financial support from the European Social Fund (ESF), the Federal Ministry of Labour and Social Affairs, and several federal states, numerous company-based demographic projects have been developed since 2005. Demographic consultants have been trained and networked to advise companies on implementing demographically sensitive personnel development. In parallel, the Federal Ministry for Research, Technology and Space is conducting research, particularly on the consequences of demographic change for work organization and corporate Innovation capacity, with a dedicated funding focus.

Studies and surveys, such as one commissioned by the Hamburg Chamber of Commerce, have shown that many human resources managers see demographic change as a particular challenge for their companies.

In 2006, numerous companies in Germany established a demographic network as a non-profit association to promote the employability and working capacity of aging employees.

== Literature ==
- Eva-Maria Antz, Julia Franz, Norbert Frieters-Reermann, Annette Scheunpflug, Markus Tolksdorf: Generationen lernen gemeinsam – Theorie und Praxis intergenerationeller Bildung. W. Bertelsmann Verlag, Bielefeld 2009, ISBN 978-3-7639-3882-7.
- Sascha Armutat: Lebensereignisorientiertes Personalmanagement, W. Bertelsmann Verlag, Bielefeld 2009, ISBN 978-3-7639-3388-4.
- Bertelsmann Stiftung (Hrsg.): Wegweiser Demographischer Wandel 2020. Analysen und Handlungskonzepte für Städte und Gemeinden, Verlag Bertelsmann Stiftung, Gütersloh 2006, ISBN 978-3-89204-875-6.
- Gerd Bosbach: Demografische Entwicklung: Realität und mediale Dramatisierung. In: Kai Biehl, Norbert Templ: Europa altert – na und? Arbeiterkammer Wien, 2007, S. 28–32, media.arbeiterkammer.at (PDF).
- Gerd Bosbach, Klaus Bingler: Der Mythos von der Kostenexplosion im Gesundheitswesen. In: Soziale Sicherheit. 9/2007
- Gerd Bosbach: Demografische Modellrechnungen. Fakten und Interpretationsspielräume. In: Reinhold Popp, Elmar Schüll (Hrsg.): Zukunftsforschung und Zukunftsgestaltung. Beiträge aus Wissenschaft und Praxis. Springer, Berlin/Heidelberg 2009, ISBN 978-3-540-78563-7, S. 523–538.
- Gerd Bosbach: Bevölkerungsentwicklung. In: Gabriele Gillen, Walter van Rossum (Hrsg.): Schwarzbuch Deutschland. Das Handbuch der vermissten Informationen. Rowohlt, Reinbek 2009, ISBN 978-3-498-02504-5.
- Thomas Bryant: Von der "Vergreisung des Volkskörpers" zum "demographischen Wandel der Gesellschaft“. Geschichte und Gegenwart des deutschen Alterungsdiskurses im 20. Jahrhundert. In: Tel Aviver Jahrbuch für deutsche Geschichte. Bd. 35(Demographie – Demokratie – Geschichte. Deutschland und Israel), Göttingen 2007, S. 110–127.
- Deutsche Gesellschaft für Personalführung: Personalentwicklung für ältere Mitarbeiter. W. Bertelsmann Verlag, Bielefeld 2004, ISBN 978-3-7639-3192-7.
- Silvia Gerisch, Kornelius Knapp, Karin Töpsch: Demografiefeste Personalpolitik in der Altenpflege. W. Bertelsmann Verlag, Bielefeld 2010, ISBN 978-3-7639-4442-2.
- Mario Gottwald, Heidemarie Hofmann: Weiterbildung und Gesundheitsförderung integrieren. W.Bertelsmann Verlag, Bielefeld 2009, ISBN 978-3-7639-4636-5.
- Karl Otto Hondrich: Weniger sind mehr: Warum der Geburtenrückgang ein Glücksfall für unsere Gesellschaft ist. Campus, Frankfurt am Main / New York 2007, ISBN 978-3-593-38270-8.
- Hagen Kühn: Demographischer Wandel und demographischer Schwindel. Zur Debatte um die deutsche Krankenversicherung, erschienen in Blätter für deutsche und internationale Politik Nr. 6 2004
- Steffen Kröhnert, Nienke van Olst, Reiner Klingholz: Deutschland 2020. Die demografische Zukunft der Nation. Berlin-Institut, Berlin 2004.
- Theo W. Länge, Barbara Menke (Hrsg.): Generation 40plus. W. Bertelsmann Verlag, Bielefeld 2007, ISBN 978-3-7639-4505-4.
- Herbert Loebe, Eckart Severing (Hrsg.): Demografischer Wandel und Weiterbildung. W. Bertelsmann Verlag, Bielefeld 2007, ISBN 978-3-7639-4486-6.
- Herbert Loebe, Eckart Severing (Hrsg.): Integration älterer Arbeitsloser. W. Bertelsmann Verlag, Bielefeld 2008, ISBN 978-3-7639-4582-5.
- Anne Meuer-Willuweit (Hrsg.): Generation Gold 50plus. W. Bertelsmann Verlag, Bielefeld 2008, ISBN 978-3-7639-4548-1.
- Elisabeth Niejahr: Alt sind nur die anderen. So werden wir leben, lieben und arbeiten. Fischer, Frankfurt am Main 2004, ISBN 978-3-596-15941-3.
- OECD (Hrsg.): Renten auf einen Blick 2009. W. Bertelsmann Verlag, Bielefeld 2010, ISBN 978-92-64-07572-6.
- Götz Richter (Hrsg.): Generationen gemeinsam im Betrieb – Individuelle Flexibilität durch anspruchsvolle Regulierungen. W. Bertelsmann Verlag, Bielefeld 2009, ISBN 978-3-7639-4571-9.
- Ulrich Reinhardt, Wolfgang Schuster: Generationenvertrag statt Generationenverrat. Freiburg 2013, ISBN 978-3-451-33276-0.
- Susanne Tatje (Hrsg.): Unsere Zukunft – Meine Stadt. Ein Buch über den demographischen Wandel für junge Menschen von 10 bis 100. KunstSinn-Verlag, Bielefeld 2012, ISBN 978-3-939264-07-1.
- Sven Voelpel, M. Leibold, J-D. Früchtenicht: Herausforderung 50+, Konzepte zum Management der Aging Workforce: Die Antwort auf das demographische Dilemma. Verlag Wiley, 2007, ISBN 978-3-89578-291-6.
- Hannes Weber: Der demographische Wandel. Mythos – Illusion – Realität. Kohlhammer, Stuttgart 2019, ISBN 978-3-17-033144-0.
- Rainer Wehrhahn, Verena Sandner Le Gall: Bevölkerungsgeographie. WBG (Wissenschaftliche Buchgesellschaft), Darmstadt 2011, ISBN 978-3-534-15628-3, S. 48–67.
- Hildegard Zimmermann: Weiterbildung im späteren Erwerbsleben. W. Bertelsmann Verlag, Bielefeld 2009, ISBN 978-3-7639-4415-6.
