= You.com =

Search engine

- Website type: Enterprise and Search AI
- Headquarters: Palo Alto, California, U.S.
- Founders: Richard Socher; Bryan McCann
- Website: you.com
- Launched: November 9, 2021; 5 years ago
- Current status: Live

You.com is an American artificial intelligence and search engine startup company.

The company was founded in 2020 by Richard Socher, the former chief scientist at Salesforce, and Bryan McCann, a former NLP researcher at Salesforce.

== History ==
The domain You.com was initially purchased in 1996 by Salesforce founder and CEO Marc Benioff, 24 years before the company was founded in 2020. You.com opened its public beta on November 9, 2021, funded in part by Benioff.

In July 2022, You.com received Series A funding round led by Radical Ventures with participation from Time Ventures, Breyer Capital, Norwest Venture Partners and Day One Ventures. In September 2024, You.com received Series B funding led by Georgian. In September 2025, You.com raised $100 million in Series C funding led by Cox Enterprises at a $1.5 billion valuation, achieving unicorn status.

In 2023, You.com pivoted from its consumer focused search engine products to artificial intelligence tools. Around January 2023, the company was incorporating AI chats into its search engine.

== Products ==
On December 23, 2022, You.com launched YouChat, making it the first search engine to launch a large language model-based chatbot with live web results alongside its responses. Later versions of YouChat included YouChat 2.0 in February 2023 and YouChat 3.0 in May 2023. A paid subscription, YouPro, followed in June 2023. In February 2025, You.com launched ARI (Advanced Research and Insights), a deep research agent.

=== APIs ===
In November 2023, You.com launched a set of APIs designed to give large language models real-time access to web content. They were initially offered in three versions: web search, news, and retrieval-augmented generation. By 2025, the company had shifted away from consumer search toward enterprise and selling search APIs. As of September 2025, the company reported processing nearly one billion queries per month.

== Reception ==
You.com was named one of TIME's Best Inventions of 2022.

You.com's ARI (Advanced Research & Insights) feature was named one of TIME's Best Inventions of 2025.
