= Franz Müntefering =

German politician and industrial manager (born 1940)

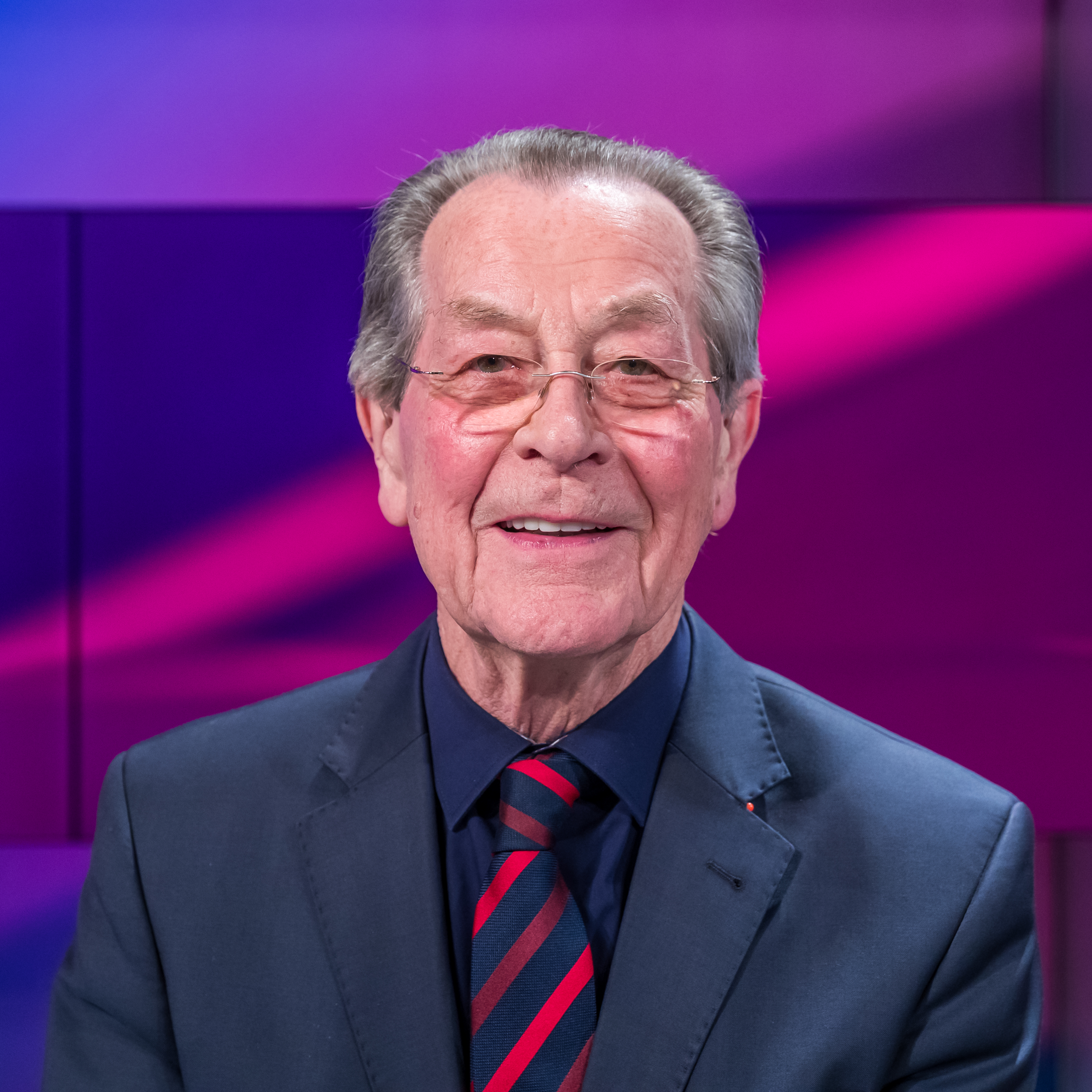
- Müntefering in 2025

Leader of the Social Democratic Party
- In office 18 October 2008 – 13 November 2009
- General Secretary: Hubertus Heil
- Preceded by: Kurt Beck
- Succeeded by: Sigmar Gabriel
- In office 21 March 2004 – 16 November 2005
- General Secretary: Klaus Uwe Benneter
- Preceded by: Gerhard Schröder
- Succeeded by: Matthias Platzeck

Vice Chancellor of Germany
- In office 22 November 2005 – 21 November 2007
- President: Horst Köhler
- Chancellor: Angela Merkel
- Preceded by: Joschka Fischer
- Succeeded by: Frank-Walter Steinmeier

Minister of Labour and Social Affairs
- In office 22 November 2005 – 21 November 2007
- Chancellor: Angela Merkel
- Preceded by: Wolfgang Clement
- Succeeded by: Olaf Scholz

General Secretary of the Social Democratic Party
- In office 7 December 1999 – 20 October 2002
- Leader: Gerhard Schröder
- Preceded by: Office established
- Succeeded by: Olaf Scholz

Managing Director of the Social Democratic Party
- In office 6 September 1999 – 13 December 1999
- Leader: Gerhard Schröder
- Preceded by: Ottmar Schreiner
- Succeeded by: Matthias Machnig
- In office 16 October 1995 – 2 November 1998
- Leader: Oskar Lafontaine
- Preceded by: Günter Verheugen
- Succeeded by: Ottmar Schreiner

Minister of Transport, Building and Urban Affairs
- In office 27 October 1998 – 29 September 1999
- Chancellor: Gerhard Schröder
- Preceded by: Eduard Oswald
- Succeeded by: Reinhard Klimmt

Personal details
- Born: 16 January 1940 (age 86) Neheim, Free State of Prussia
- Party: Social Democratic
- Spouse(s): Renate (m. 1960s; div. 1990s) Ankepetra Rettich (m. 1995; died 2008) Michelle Schumann (m. 2009)
- Occupation: Industrial manager; politician

Military service
- Allegiance: Germany
- Branch/service: Bundeswehr
- Years of service: 1961–1961
- Unit: German Army (Heer) / Mechanized infantry (Panzergrenadiertruppe)

Franz Müntefering (German: [ˈmʏntəˌfeːʁɪŋ]; born 16 January 1940) is a German politician. He was Chairman of the Social Democratic Party (SPD) from 2004 to 2005 and again from 18 October 2008 to 13 November 2009. He served as the minister of Labour and Social Affairs, as well as the vice chancellor of Germany, in the cabinet of Chancellor Angela Merkel from 2005 to 2007.

== Early life and education ==
Müntefering was born in Neheim (now part of Arnsberg). He trained as an industrial salesman and worked for local metalwork companies.

== Political career ==
Müntefering joined the SPD in 1966. He was a member of the Bundestag from 1975 to 1992 and again since 1998.

From 1992 until 1995, Müntefering served as State Minister of Labor, Health and Social Affairs in the government of Minister-President Johannes Rau of North Rhine-Westphalia. He was a member of the State Parliament of North Rhine-Westphalia 1995 to 1998.

Müntefering was Bundesgeschäftsführer (executive director) of the national SPD from 1995 to 1998. In this capacity, he managed the 1998 campaign that returned the SPD to power in the federal government after 16 years in opposition.

From 1998 until 1999, Müntefering briefly held the post of Minister of Transportation and Construction in the first cabinet of Chancellor Gerhard Schröder. In this capacity, he organized the government's move from Bonn to Berlin.

Müntefering was the first to hold the new post of SPD Secretary General from 1999 to 2002, and thereafter became leader of the SPD parliamentary group in the Bundestag.

=== Investigation into contracts for construction of waste-disposal facilities ===
In 2002, news surfaced that, while Müntefering was head of the SPD in the North Rhine-Westphalia during the 1990s, local officials in the city of Cologne and possibly elsewhere allegedly engaged in corruption that involved illegal political donations from builders of waste-disposal facilities. Müntefering denied any knowledge of the anonymous donations and launched an internal investigation into all contracts awarded for the construction of waste-disposal facilities in North Rhine-Westphalia in the 1990s. On 22 March, he testified about the affair before Parliament's investigative committee.

=== Chairman of the SPD, 2004–2005 ===
In June 2004 Müntefering was designated to succeed Schröder as party chairman in July 2004.

Following Schröder's defeat in the close 2005 elections, Müntefering helped form a grand coalition under Angela Merkel, the new Chancellor, and her center-right CDU/CSU parties. During the coalition talks, on 31 October 2005, Müntefering's favoured candidate for Secretary General of the SPD, Kajo Wasserhövel, was defeated by the left-wing candidate Andrea Nahles in a preliminary internal election. Müntefering subsequently announced his intention to resign as SPD Chairman, and was succeeded by Matthias Platzeck at the next party convention on 15 November 2005.

=== Vice Chancellor and Federal Minister of Labour and Social Affairs, 2005–2007 ===
Müntefering became Federal Minister of Labour and Social Affairs and Vice Chancellor in the cabinet of Chancellor Angela Merkel on 22 November 2005. During his time in office, the government agreed to raise the retirement age in steps to 67 from 65 by 2029.

After two years in those posts, Müntefering's spokesman said on 13 November 2007 that Müntefering would resign from them later in the month. The decision was said to be based on "purely familial reasons". Later in the day, Müntefering said that he would leave his positions in the government on 21 November attributing his decision to the illness of his wife, Ankepetra, who was suffering from cancer. Upon leaving office on 21 November 2007, he was replaced as Vice Chancellor by Frank-Walter Steinmeier and as Minister of Labor by Olaf Scholz, both of whom are also members of the SPD.

=== Chairman of the SPD, 2008–2009 ===
Müntefering's wife Ankepetra died on 31 July 2008. Following her death, Müntefering decided to return to active politics and was elected Chairman of the Social Democratic Party of Germany on 18 October 2008. On 7 September 2008, Kurt Beck had resigned as SPD Chairman.

Following the SPD's defeat in the federal election of 2009, Müntefering resigned from the position of party chairman of the Social Democratic Party.

== Political positions ==
In 2004, Müntefering demanded that his party take a critical position towards certain practices of private equity firms. In a speech in November 2004, he first associated private financial investors with locusts:

We must help companies acting in the interest of their future and the future of their employees against irresponsible locust swarms, who measure success in quarterly intervals, suck off substance and let companies die once they have eaten them bare...

This metaphor was repeated several times by both official pamphlets of the SPD and by German media, including by Müntefering himself in an April 2005 speech that criticized the market economy of Germany and proposed more state involvement to promote economic justice.

Originally, none of the companies were named specifically. Müntefering subsequently published a "locust list" of companies, which he circulated within the SPD. The online news magazine stern.de also published an article with a list of companies, namely Apax, BC Partners, Carlyle Group, Advent International, Permira, Blackstone Group, CVC Capital Partners, Saban Capital Group, KKR, WCM AG, and Goldman Sachs. This began a debate which dominated the national news, the front page, and the main television news broadcasts nearly daily. Müntefering's suggestions were criticized by employers and many economists, including former US Secretary of Treasury John W. Snow: "I do not think in these terms". The stock exchange of Düsseldorf made Locust the "faux-pas word" of 2005.

Müntefering's criticism met with popular support (up to 75% in some opinion polls), and "locust" has since found its way into the German language as an established term for shady financial business practices. The term has been popularized by and is continually used in discussions critical to capitalism in Germany. Remaining a mostly German phenomenon, "locust" has also spread to English and American media, such as the New York Times, the International Herald Tribune, FT, and The Economist.

== Life after politics ==
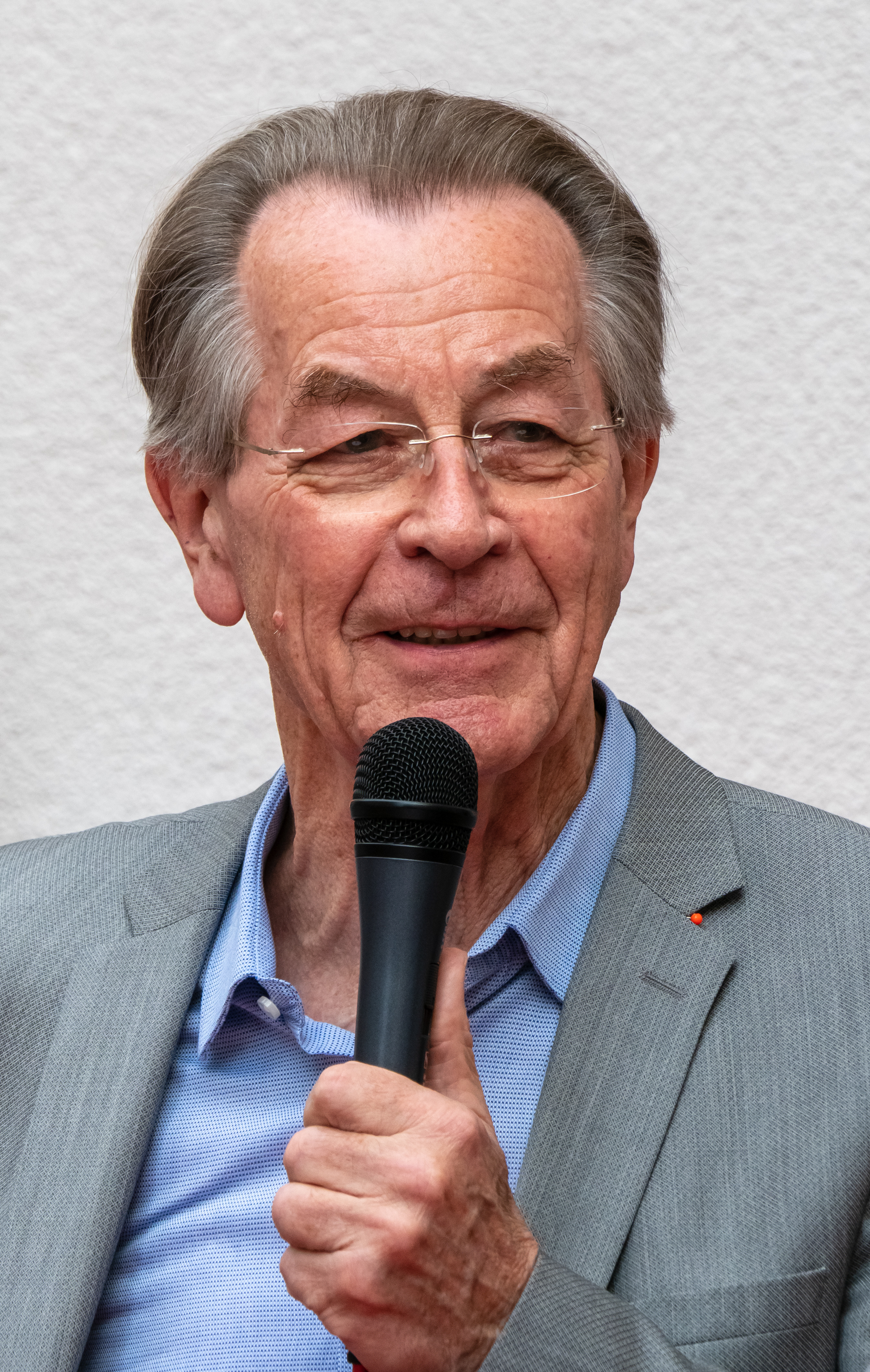
Müntefering in 2018

Since leaving active politics, Müntefering has held a variety of honorary positions, including the following:

- German Foundation for Active Citizenship and Volunteering (DSEE), Member of the Board of Trustees (since 2020)
- Berlin Demography Forum, chairman of the Advisory Board
- Friedrich Ebert Foundation (FES), Member
- Witten/Herdecke University, Member of the Board of Trustees (since 2014)
- Herbert and Greta Wehner Foundation, Member of the Board (since 2002)
- Deutsche Hospiz- und PalliativStiftung, Member of the Board of Trustees
- German National Association of Senior Citizens' Organizations (BAGSO), chairman since 2015

Müntefering was a SPD delegate to the Federal Convention for the purpose of electing the President of Germany in 2017.

Political offices
Preceded by Matthias Wissmann as German Minister of Transport	German Minister of Transport, Building and Housing; 1998–1999	Succeeded by Reinhard Klimmt
Preceded by Eduard Oswald as German Minister of Regional Planning, Building and Urban Development	German Minister of Transport, Building and Housing; 1998–1999	Succeeded by Reinhard Klimmt
Preceded by Wolfgang Clement as German Minister for Economics and Labour	German Minister of Labour and Social Affairs; 2005–2007	Succeeded by Olaf Scholz
Preceded by Joschka Fischer	Vice-Chancellor of Germany; 2005–2007	Succeeded by Frank-Walter Steinmeier
Party political offices
Preceded by None	General Secretary of the Social Democratic Party of Germany; 1999–2002	Succeeded by Olaf Scholz
Preceded by Gerhard Schröder	Chairman of the Social Democratic Party of Germany; 2004–2005	Succeeded by Matthias Platzeck
Preceded by Kurt Beck	Chairman of the Social Democratic Party of Germany; 2008–2009	Succeeded by Sigmar Gabriel
