= A. Francis Stewart =

Australian biochemist and genetic engineer

- Born: October 13, 1956 (age 70); Bristol, UK
- Occupations: Biochemist, developmental biologist and genetic engineer

Academic background
- Education: BSc; PhD, University of New South Wales

A. Francis Stewart is an Australian biochemist, developmental biologist, and genetic engineer. He is an emeritus senior professor at Technische Universität Dresden.

Stewart's research focused on epigenetics and genome engineering, mainly in mammalian systems. His work in genetic engineering was acknowledged by the International Society for Transgenic Technologies Prize in 2010. He was elected a member of the European Molecular Biology Organization (EMBO) in 2007 and Academia Europaea in 2020.

== Education and career ==
Stewart earned a BSc degree in Biochemistry in 1981 and a PhD in 1985, both from the University of New South Wales, where he sequenced and investigated cloned DNAs encoding bovine milk proteins in Tony Mackinlay's laboratory. In 1991, he was appointed group leader in the Gene Expression Program at the European Molecular Biology Laboratory (EMBL) in Heidelberg. In 2001, he became group leader at the Biotechnology Center (BIOTEC) and chair of Genomics at Technische Universität Dresden (TU Dresden). From 2014 to 2016, he was the director at BIOTEC. He contributed to the expansion of the Tatzberg research campus to include the DFG Center for Regenerative Therapies Dresden (CRTD) Excellence Initiative in 2005, and the DFG Physics of Life (PoL) Excellence Initiative in 2019.

Stewart co-founded and chaired the biotech company Gene Bridges.

== Research ==
With Colin Logie, Stewart developed ligand-inducible site-specific recombinases (SSR-LBDs). To address the thermal instability of FLP recombinase, he and Frank Buchholz engineered the thermostable variant FLPe.

To support large-scale genome engineering, Stewart and Youming Zhang developed recombineering, a method using λ-Red and/or RecE/RecT-mediated homologous recombination in E. coli, which allows for flexible and precise manipulation of large DNA constructs such as BACs. Building upon this, his lab streamlined the protocol to eliminate unwanted recombination events.

== Awards and honors ==
- 2007 – Member, European Molecular Biology Organization
- 2010 – International Society for Transgenic Technology Prize, International Society for Transgenic Technologies
- 2020 – Member, Academia Europaea

== Selected articles ==
- Logie, Colin; Stewart, A. Francis (1995). "Ligand-regulated site-specific recombination". Proceedings of the National Academy of Sciences of the United States of America. 92 (13): 5940–5944. Bibcode:1995PNAS...92.5940L. doi:10.1073/pnas.92.13.5940. PMC 41617. PMID 7597057.
- Aasland, Rein; Gibson, Toby J.; Stewart, A. Francis (1995). "The PHD finger: implications for chromatin-mediated transcriptional regulation". Trends in Biochemical Sciences. 20 (2): 56–59. doi:10.1016/S0968-0004(00)88957-4. PMID 7701562.
- Zhang, Yijun; Buchholz, Frank; Muyrers, Joachim P.; Stewart, A. Francis (1998). "A new logic for DNA engineering using recombination in Escherichia coli". Nature Genetics. 20 (2): 123–128. doi:10.1038/2417. PMID 9771703.
- Rodríguez, Carolyn I.; Buchholz, Frank; Galloway, Jenna; et al. (2000). "High-efficiency deleter mice show that FLPe is an alternative to Cre-loxP". Nature Genetics. 25 (2): 139–140. doi:10.1038/75973. PMID 10835623.
- Roguev, Andrei; Schaft, Dirk; Shevchenko, Andrej; et al. (2001). "The S. cerevisiae Set1 complex includes an Ash2-like protein and methylates histone 3 lysine 4". EMBO Journal. 20 (24): 7137–7148. doi:10.1093/emboj/20.24.7137. PMC 125774. PMID 11742990.
- Erler, Axel; Wegmann, Susanne; Elie-Caille, Celine; et al. (2009). "Conformational adaptability of Redβ during DNA annealing and implications for its structural relationship with Rad52". Journal of Molecular Biology. 391 (3): 586–598. doi:10.1016/j.jmb.2009.06.030. PMID 19527729.
- Skarnes, William C.; Rosen, Benjamin; West, Anthony P.; et al. (2011). "A conditional knockout resource for the genome-wide study of mouse gene function". Nature. 474 (7351): 337–342. doi:10.1038/nature10163. PMC 3572410. PMID 21677750.
- Goveas, Neethu; Waskow, Claudia; Arndt, Katharina; et al. (2021). "MLL1 is required for maintenance of intestinal stem cells". PLOS Genetics. 17 (12) e1009250. doi:10.1371/journal.pgen.1009250. PMC 8641872. PMID 34860830.
- Kharlamova, Maria A.; Kushwah, Mahesh S.; Jachowski, Thomas J.; et al. (2025). "Monomers and short oligomers of human RAD52 promote single-strand annealing". Proceedings of the National Academy of Sciences. 122 (14) e2420771122. Bibcode:2025PNAS..12220771K. doi:10.1073/pnas.2420771122. PMC 12002259. PMID 40184180.
