= Kryry =

- Town
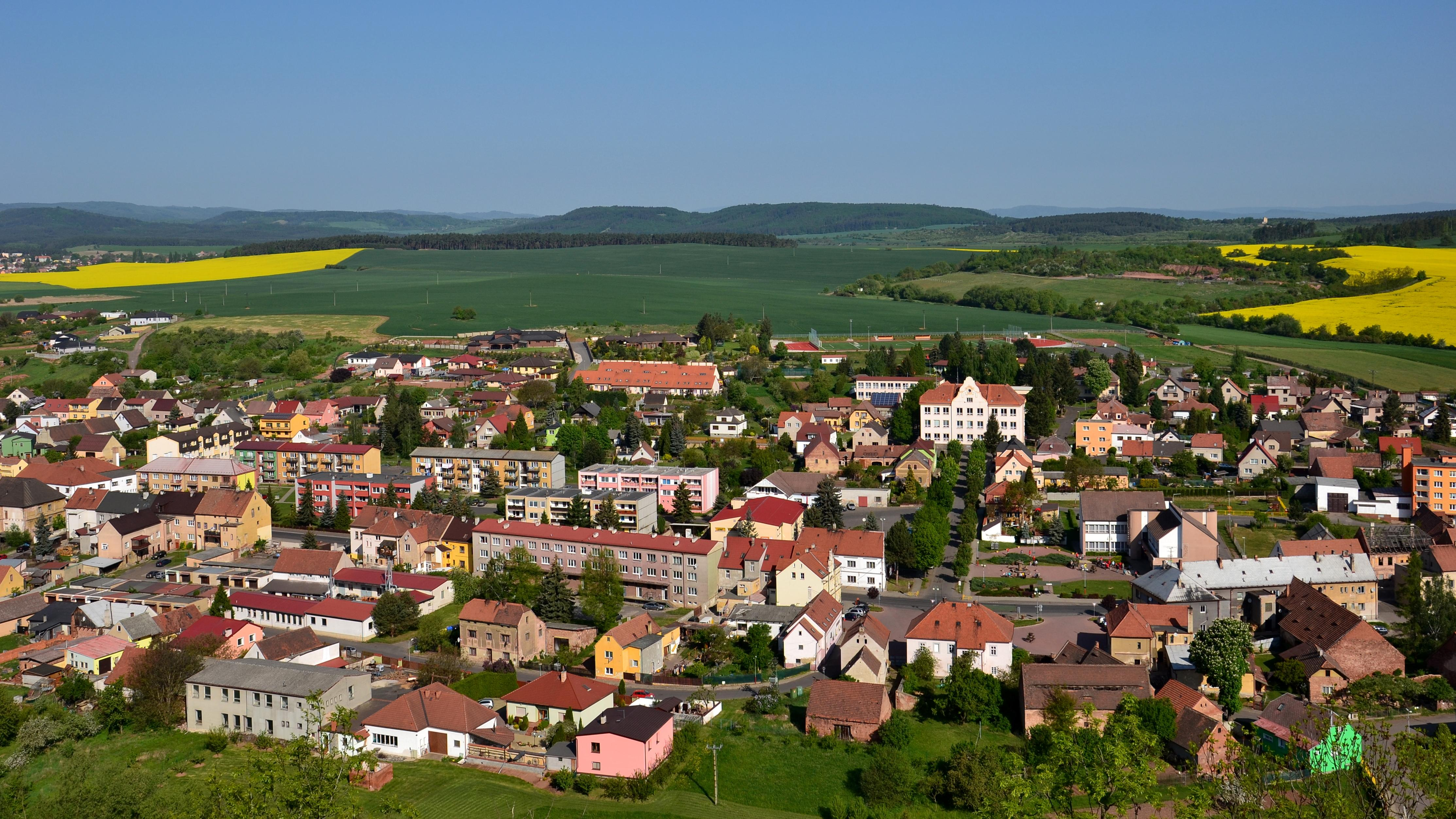
- View from the Schiller Observation Tower

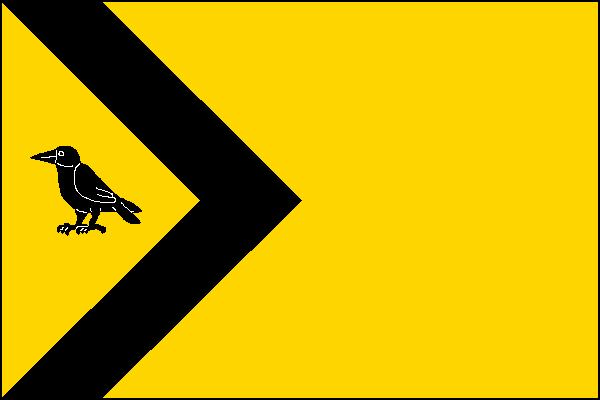
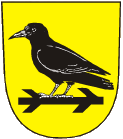
- Flag Coat of arms

- Location in the Czech Republic
- Coordinates: 50°10′24″N 13°25′39″E
- Country: Czech Republic
- Region: Ústí nad Labem
- District: Louny
- First mentioned: 1320

Government
  - Mayor: Petr Ulke

Area
  - Total: 39.46 km^{2} (15.24 sq mi)
- Elevation: 304 m (997 ft)

Population (2026-01-01)
  - Total: 2,355
  - Density: 59.68/km^{2} (154.6/sq mi)
- Time zone: UTC+1 (CET)
  - Summer (DST): UTC+2 (CEST)
- Postal codes: 439 81, 439 86, 441 01
- Website: www.kryry.cz

Kryry (Czech pronunciation: [ˈkrɪrɪ]; German: Kriegern) is a town in Louny District in the Ústí nad Labem Region of the Czech Republic. It has about 2,400 inhabitants.

== Administrative division ==
Kryry consists of four municipal parts (in brackets population according to the 2021 census):

- Kryry (1,842)
- Běsno (117)
- Stebno (139)
- Strojetice (202)

Stebno forms an exclave of the municipal territory.

== Etymology ==
The name is derived from a Polish word for 'scream', 'shout', 'caw'.

== Geography ==
Kryry is located about 33 kilometres (21 mi) southwest of Louny, 47 km (29 mi) north of Plzeň, and 65 km (40 mi) west of Prague. It lies in the Rakovník Uplands. The highest point is below the top of the hill Hůrka at 435 m (1,427 ft) above sea level. The Blšanka River flows through the town.

== History ==
The first written mention of Kryry is from 1320. During the Hussite Wars in 1421, the Czech population was murdered by crusaders and the village became ethnically German. The German-speaking population was expelled after World War II.

== Demographics ==
Historical population

Year	Pop.	±%
1869	2,914	—
1880	3,625	+24.4%
1890	3,731	+2.9%
1900	3,806	+2.0%
1910	4,202	+10.4%

Year	Pop.	±%
1921	4,103	−2.4%
1930	4,124	+0.5%
1950	2,384	−42.2%
1961	2,638	+10.7%
1970	2,485	−5.8%

Year	Pop.	±%
1980	2,573	+3.5%
1991	2,454	−4.6%
2001	2,446	−0.3%
2011	2,345	−4.1%
2021	2,300	−1.9%

Source: Censuses

== Transport ==
The I/6 road (part of the European route E48), which replaces here the unfinished section of the D6 motorway, runs through the Stebno exclave.

Kryry is located on the railway line Plzeň–Most.

== Sights ==
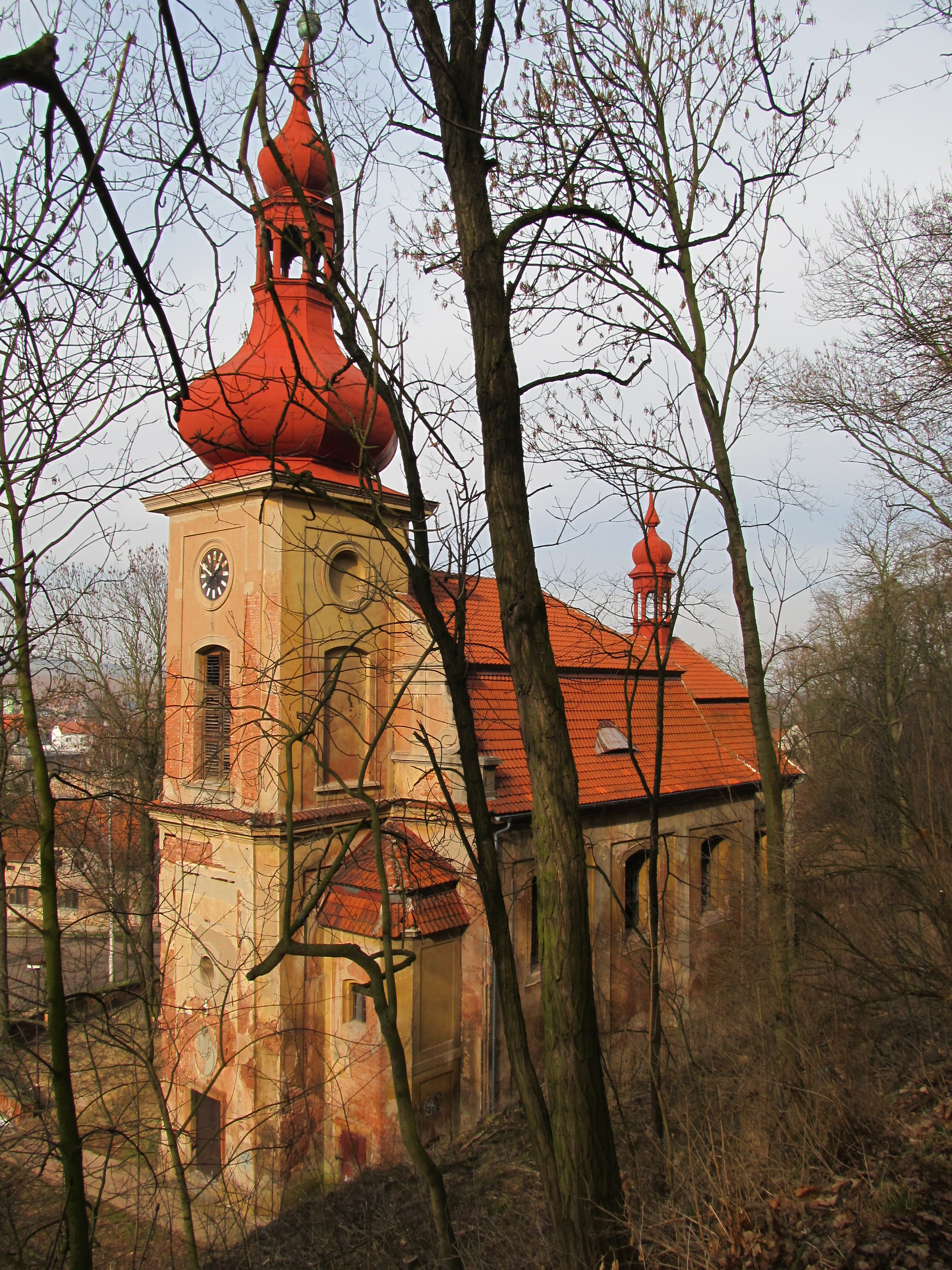
Church of the Nativity of the Virgin Mary

The most significant monument is the Church of the Nativity of the Virgin Mary. It was built around 1324, and in 1722 it was rebuilt in the Baroque style.

The Schiller Observation Tower was built on a hill above the town in 1905–1906. It was named after the writer Friedrich Schiller, on the centenary of his death.

== Notable people ==
- Günther Landgraf (1928–2006), German physicist
