= Günther Landgraf =

German physicist

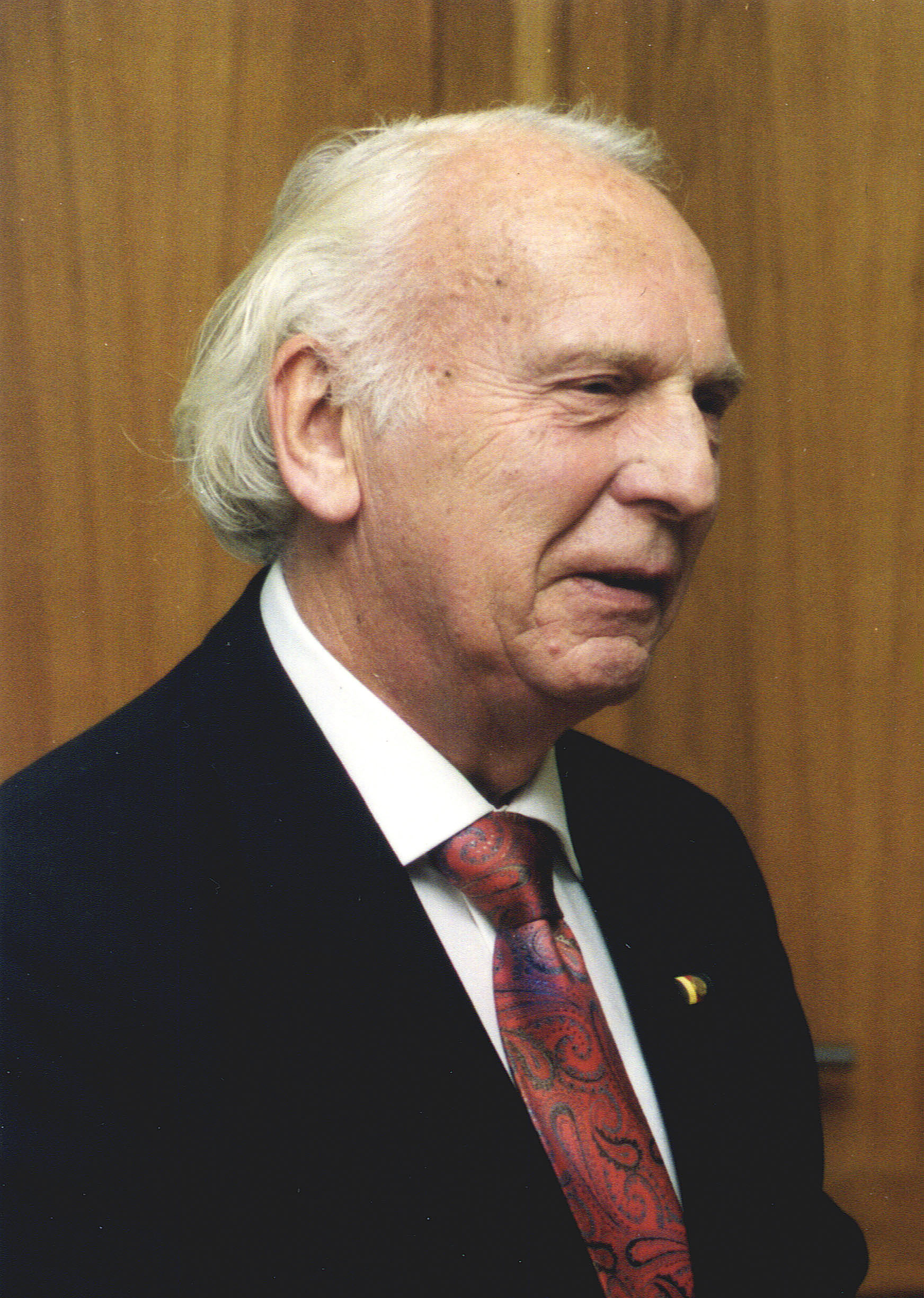
Günther Landgraf

Günther Landgraf (14 September 1928 in Kryry – 12 January 2006 in Dresden) was a German physicist and, from 1990 till 1994, President of Technische Universität Dresden.

Günther Landgraf was born in Kryry, in Bohemia (now Czech Republic). He came to Dresden in 1938 and studied physics. Landgraf graduated in fatigue strength science at the Technische Hochschule Dresden in 1952 and received his Ph.D. in 1961 and Habilitation at the renamed Technische Universität Dresden in 1969.

1970 he was appointed to Professor for theory of plasticity at the Dresden University of Technology. Landgraf was the first free elected President of the Dresden University of Technology in 1990. He received the status of a full university.

Landgraf did not cease work after his retirement in 1996 and came daily for several hours in the office. He wrote far appraisals and specialized books. In addition he was since 1991 scientific director of the created institute "European Institute for postgraduate Studies at the University of Technology at Dresden" (EIPOS). Up until his illness, Günther Landgraf also took care of over 70 graduate students.

He is buried in the Trinity Cemetery in Dresden.

== Honors ==
- 1997 honorary senator of the Technische Universität Dresden
- 1994 Order of Merit of the Federal Republic of Germany ("Bundesverdienstkreuz")
- 1990 honorary doctor of the Chemnitz University of Technology
- 1978 National Prize of the German Democratic Republic
