= M. Michele Burns =

American businesswoman

- Born: February 1958 (age 68); Georgia, United States
- Education: University of Georgia (BBA)
- Known for: American Businesswoman

Martha Michele Burns (born February 1958 in Georgia) is an American businesswoman. She was chairman and CEO of Mercer between 2006 and 2011 and was director on the boards of a number of major American companies, including Cisco Systems, Wal-Mart, and Goldman Sachs.

== Education ==
She received a Bachelor of Business Administration summa cum laude from the University of Georgia in 1979, a Master of Accountancy from the same university in 1980.

== Early career ==
From 1981 to 1999, she worked for Arthur Andersen as a Senior Tax Partner. She served as Vice President for Corporate Tax of Delta Air Lines from 1999 to 2000, and as its Executive Vice President and Chief Financial Officer from 2000 to 2004. From 2004 to 2006, she served as EVP, CFO and restructuring officer of Mirant.

== CEO and director ==
From 2006 to 2011, she served as Executive Vice President and Chief Financial Officer of Marsh & McLennan, and Chairman and CEO of Mercer. She sits on the Boards of Directors of Cisco Systems. Previously, she sat on the Boards of Wal-Mart, Goldman Sachs, Orbitz and Worldspan.

== Support of politics and arts ==
She supports the Democratic Party. She has supported Al Gore and Hillary Clinton, and she has made donations to EMILY's List. She sits on the Boards of Trustees of the Atlanta Symphony Orchestra and the Elton John AIDS Foundation, where she serves as Treasurer. In 2010, she earned $4,648,029.00.
