= Ursula Staudinger =

German psychologist

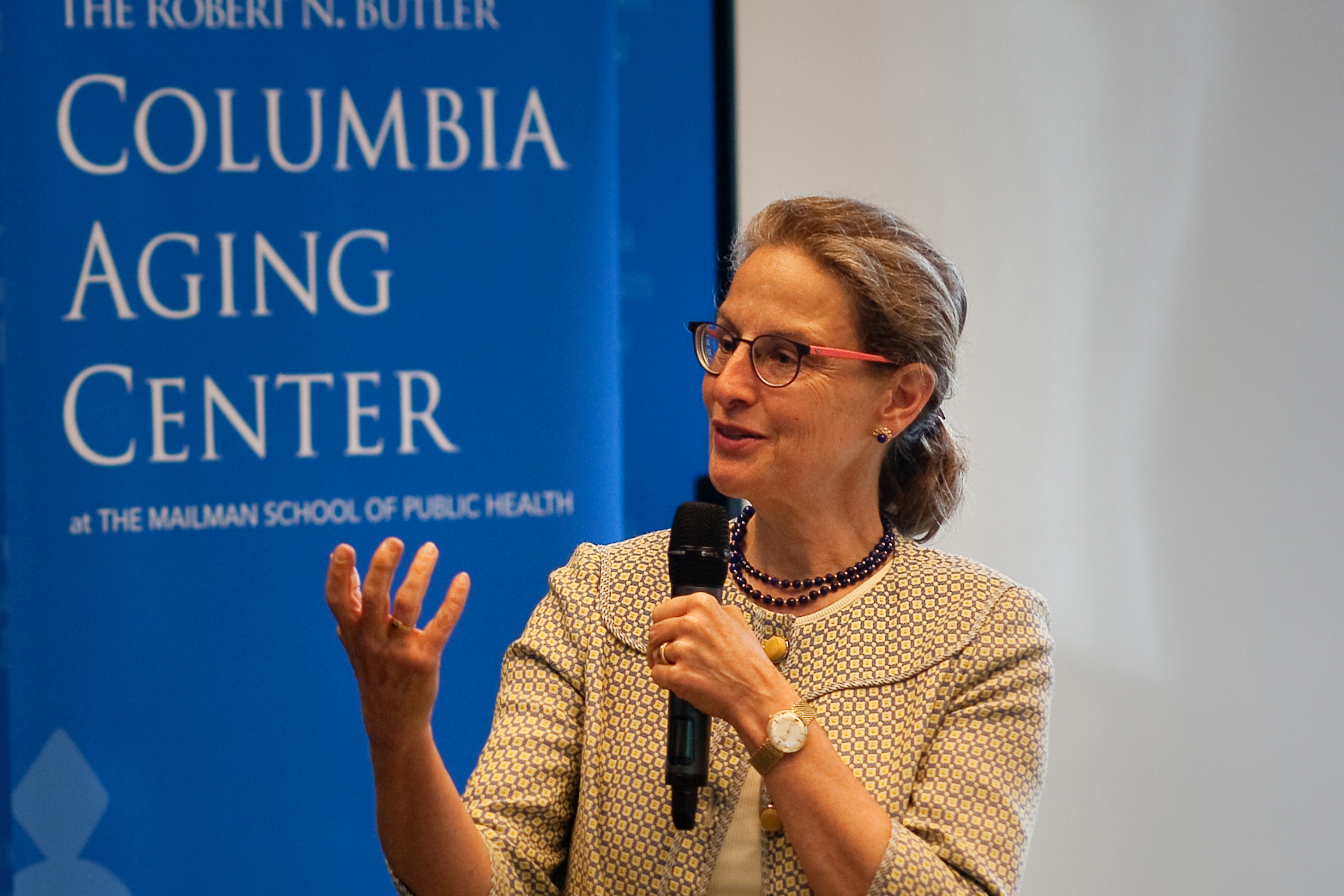
- Born: Ursula M. Staudinger; 3 April 1959 (age 67); Nuremberg, West Germany
- Education: Friedrich-Alexander-University, Clark University, Free University of Berlin
- Occupation: psychologist
- Years active: 1988–present
- Known for: researcher of aging
- Awards: see details

Ursula Marie Staudinger (born April 3, 1959, in Nuremberg, West Germany) is a German psychologist and researcher of aging. She is the rector of the Technical University of Dresden (TUD). She was Professor of Sociomedical Sciences and Professor of Psychology at the Robert N. Butler Columbia Aging Center at Columbia University. Between 2013 and 2017 Staudinger was the founding director of the Robert N. Butler Columbia Aging Center and president of the affiliated International Longevity Center.

== Biography ==
Staudinger studied psychology at the Friedrich-Alexander-University Erlangen and at Clark University in Massachusetts from 1978 to 1984, receiving an MA from Erlangen in 1984. She carried out her dissertation at the Max Planck Institute for Human Development in Berlin and obtained her doctorate from the Free University of Berlin in 1988. In 1997, she received her habilitation (venia legendi) in psychology from the Free University Berlin.

== Academic career ==
From 1988 to 1992, Staudinger was a research scientist at the Academy of Sciences and Technology in Berlin. From 1992 to 1999, she was a senior scientist at the Max Planck Institute for Human Development leading the research group on wisdom. Staudinger held a chair in lifespan psychology at Technical University Dresden from 1999 to 2003. She was then appointed vice president and professor at the Jacobs University Bremen where she founded and led the Jacobs Center on Lifelong Learning and Development from 2003 to 2013.

From July 2013 until December 2017, Staudinger was the founding director of the Robert N. Butler Columbia Aging Center, a university-wide center that is based at the Mailman School of Public Health, Columbia University and the Robert N. Butler Professor of Sociomedical Sciences and Professor of Psychology. As part her duties as director of the Aging Center, she also led the International Longevity Center (ILC).

From 2007 until 2017, Staudinger was vice president and Foreign Secretary of the German Academy of Sciences Leopoldina. She is chairwoman of the Board of Trustees of the German Federal Institute for Population Research since 2012 and consults the German Government on issues related to demographic change. She was Speaker of the working group "Aging in Germany" (2009) and member of the working group "Future with Children" (2012), which were initiated by the German Academy of Sciences Leopoldina and provided recommendations for policy and society. Staudinger was Speaker of the working group "Mastering Demographic Change in Europe" (2014), which published a joint statement signed by eight European academies and was endorsed by ALLEA (All European Academies). She has been a visiting professor at Stanford University and the University of Florida. Since 2018 Staudinger is Member of the University Council of Ruhr-Universität Bochum.

On March 17, 2020, Staudinger was elected as new rector of the TU Dresden, succeeding Hans Müller-Steinhagen. She took office as rector of the university on 18 August 2020.

== Research ==
Staudinger's research focuses on human development and aging. She has worked on identifying the conditions under which individuals and societies can optimize aging. Her scientific research includes aspects of lifespan psychology, such as the potential of lifelong development (resilience and plasticity); the development of life insight, conduct of life and wisdom across the lifespan as well as inter-generational relationships.

Her work has been featured in articles by AARP, The Huffington Post, and New York Times among others. In December 2014, Staudinger delivered a plenary speech during the Nobel Week Dialogue 2014, Demographic Change and Growth: A Paradox?

== Awards and fellowships ==
- 2017, Seneca Medal for Aging Research
- 2014, Braunschweig Research Prize
- 2015, Fellow, New York Academy of Medicine (NYAM)
- 2014, Fellow, The Gerontological Society of America (GSA)
- 2013, Member of Academia Europaea
- 2011, Fellow, Association for Psychological Science (APS)
- 2008–2010, President (2006–2008 Vice President) German Society for Psychology
- 2002–present, Member (Vice President and Foreign Secretary from 2007 to 2017), Academy of Sciences Leopoldina
- 2002–present, Corresponding Member, Heidelberg Academy for Sciences and Humanities
- 1999, Fellow, American Psychological Association (APA)

== Publications (selection) ==
- Staudinger, U. M. (2020). The positive plasticity of adult development: Potential for the 21st century. American Psychologist.
- Hessel, P., Kinge, J. M., Skirbekk, V., Staudinger, U. M. (2018). Trends and determinants of the Flynn effect in cognitive functioning among older individuals in 10 European countries. Journal of Epidemiology and Community Health, 1–7. doi:10.1136/jech-2017-209979
- Mergenthaler, A., Sackreuther, I., & Staudinger, U. M. (2018). Productive activity patterns among 60-70-year-old retirees in Germany. Ageing & Society, 1-30. doi:10.1017/S0144686X17001404
- Calvo, E., Madero-Cabib, I., & Staudinger, U. M. (2017). Retirement sequences of older Americans: Moderately destandardized and highly stratified across gender, class, and race. Gerontologist, 00(00), 1–11. doi:10.1093/geront/gnx052
- Bonsang, E., Skirbekk, V., & Staudinger, U. M. (2017). As you sow, so shall you reap: Gender norms and late-life cognition. Psychological Science, 28(9), 1201–1213. doi:10.1177/0956797617708634
- Oltmanns, J., Godde, B., Winneke, A., Richter, G., Niemann, C., Voelcker-Rehage, C., . . . Staudinger, U. M. (2017). Don't lose your brain at work – The role of recurrent novelty at work in cognitive and brain aging. Frontiers in Psychology, 8(117), 1–16. doi:10.3389/fpsyg.2017.00117
- Wink, P., & Staudinger, U. M. (2016). Wisdom and psychosocial functioning in later life. Journal of Personality, 84, 306–318. doi:10.1111/jopy.12160
- Staudinger, U. M., Finkelstein, R., Calvo, E., & Sivaramakrishnan, K. (2016). A global view on the effect of work on health in later life. The Gerontologist, 56, S281-S292. doi:10.1093/geront/gnw032
- Scheibe, S., Sheppes, G., & Staudinger, U. M. (2015). Distract or reappraise? Age-related differences in emotion-regulation choice. Emotion, 15(6), 677–681. doi:http://dx.doi.org/10.1037/a0039246
- Heidemeier, H., & Staudinger, U. M. (2015). Age differences in achievement goals and motivational characteristics of work in an ageing workforce. Ageing & Society, 35(4), 809–836. doi:10.1017/S0144686X13001098
- Staudinger, U.M. (2015). "Images of aging: Outside and inside perspectives." In: Annual Review of Gerontology and Geriatrics, 35(1), 187–210.
- Skirbekk, V., Stonawski, M., Bosang, E. & Staudinger, U. M. (2013). "The Flynn effect and population aging." In: Intelligence, 41(3), 169–177.
- Uglanova, E. A., & Staudinger, U. M. (2013). "Zooming in on Life Events: Is Hedonic Adaptation Sensitive to the Temporal Distance from the Event?" In: Social Indicators Research, 111(1), 265–286.
- Mühlig-Versen, A., Bowen, C. E., & Staudinger, U. M. (2012). "Personality Plasticity in Later Adulthood: Contextual and Personal Resources Are Needed to Increase Openness to New Experiences." Psychology & Aging, 27(4), 855–866.
- U. Staudinger und J. Glück: "Psychological Wisdom Research: Commonalities and Differences in a Growing Field." Annual Review of Psychology 62, 2011
- C. Voelcker-Rehage, B. Godde und U.M. Staudinger: Physical and motor fitness are both related to cognition in old age. European Journal of Neuroscience 31, 2010, 167–176
- U. Staudinger und E.-M. Kessler: "Intergenerational potential: Effects of social interaction between older people and adolescents." Psychology and Aging 22, 2007, 690–704
- U. Staudinger und H. Häfner: Was ist Alter(n)? Verlag Springer, 2007, ISBN 3-540-76710-X, at Google Books
- Paul B. Baltes und U. Staudinger: Interactive minds: life-span perspectives on the social foundation of cognition. Cambridge University Press, 1996, ISBN 0-521-48567-3, at Google Books
- U. Staudinger und Ulman Lindenberger: Understanding Human Development. Verlag Springer, 2003, ISBN 9781402073830, at Google Books.
- L. G. Aspinwall und U. Staudinger: A psychology of human strengths. American Psychological Association, 2004, ISBN 1-557-98931-1
