= Jasień, Lesser Poland Voivodeship =

Jasień
- Village
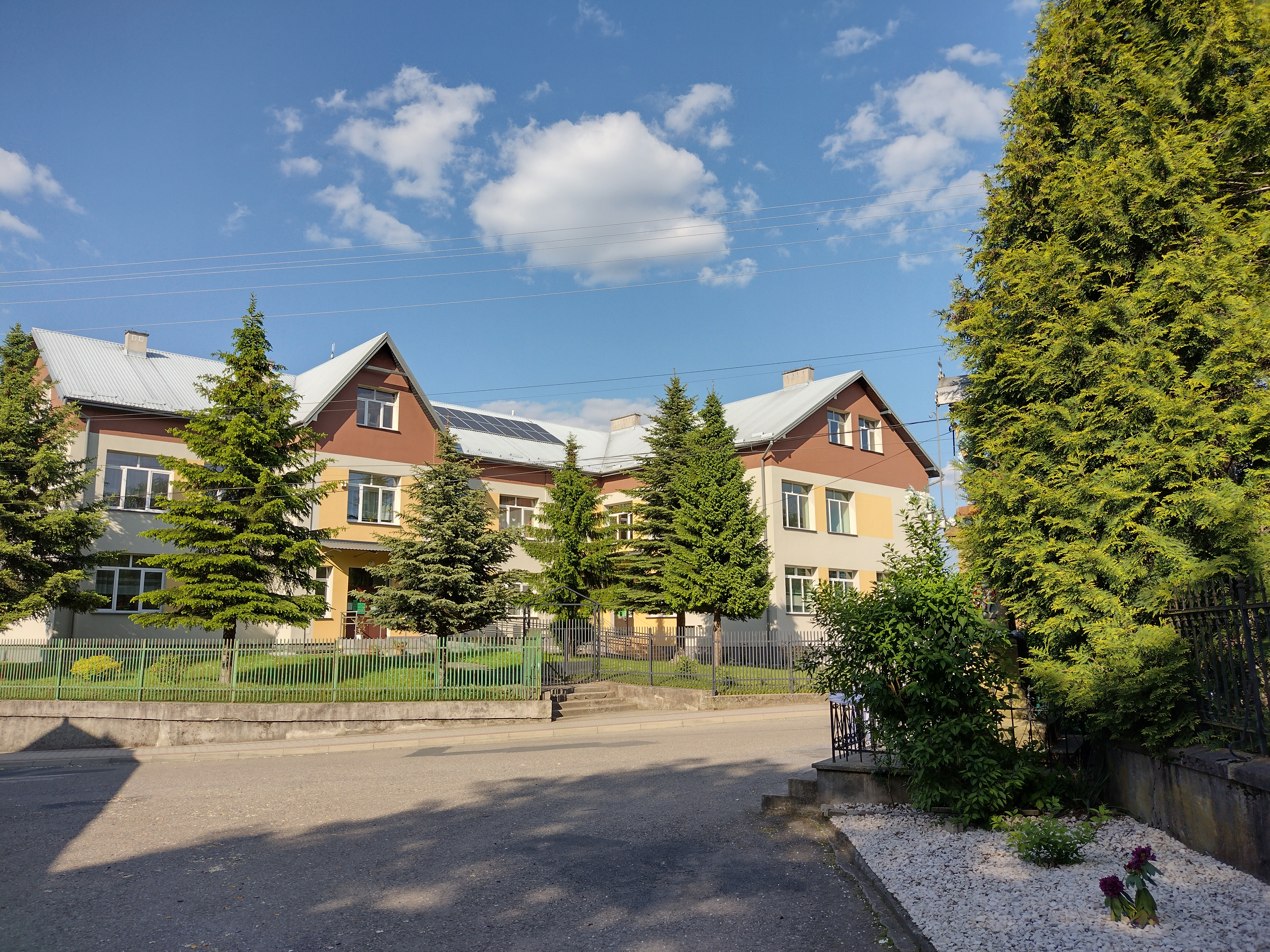
- Elementary school

- Location within Poland
- Coordinates: 49°58′10″N 20°34′15″E
- Country: Poland
- Voivodeship: Lesser Poland
- County: Brzesko
- Gmina: Brzesko
- Population: 2,200

Jasień [ˈjaɕɛɲ] is a village in the administrative district of Gmina Brzesko, within Brzesko County, Lesser Poland Voivodeship, in southern Poland.
