= Richard Socher =

AI researcher and entrepreneur (born 1983)

- Socher in 2026
- Born: 1983 (age 42–43); Dresden, Saxony, in Germany
- Education: Ph.D. in computer science
- Alma mater: University of Leipzig; Saarland University; Stanford University

Richard Socher (born 1983) is a German-born computer scientist focusing on artificial intelligence (AI) research. He is the co-founder and CEO of You.com, an AI search infrastructure company, and co-founder and CEO of Recursive, a company pursuing recursive self-improvement. He is also a co-founder and investment partner of AIX Ventures, an AI venture capital firm. He was a researcher for ImageNet, a visual database. In 2014, Socher co-authored GloVe, an unsupervised learning algorithm that embeds words in multi-dimensional vectors.

== Biography ==
Socher was born in 1983 in Dresden, Saxony, in Germany. He earned degrees from the University of Leipzig and Saarland University before completing his PhD in computer science at Stanford University in 2014.

In 2009, Fei-Fei Li and a team of researchers, including Socher, developed ImageNet. The large visual database is designed for use in visual object recognition software research, and hand-annotates images to indicate what objects are pictured and in at least one million of the images, bounding boxes are also provided. ImageNet contains more than 20,000 categories, with a typical category, such as "balloon" or "strawberry", consisting of several hundred images. The database of annotations of third-party image URLs is freely available directly from ImageNet, though the actual images are not owned by ImageNet.

In 2014, Socher completed a PhD at Stanford University. In the same year, three co-authors, including Socher, launched GloVe, an open-source, unsupervised learning algorithm that embeds words in multi-dimensional vectors. GloVe sought to compete with Word2Vec. Socher and co-authors argued that “for the same corpus, vocabulary, window size, and training time, GloVe consistently outperforms word2vec”. Later, Transformer-based models, such as BERT, have improved upon the GloVe model.

In 2014, Socher founded MetaMind, an AI and software company subsequently acquired by Salesforce in 2016. Socher served as Chief Scientist at Salesforce.

In 2020, Socher left Salesforce to co-found You.com. In September 2025, You.com raised $100 million in a Series C round led by Cox Enterprises, valuing the company at $1.5 billion.

In 2025, Socher co-founded Recursive, a company pursuing recursive self-improvement in AI, alongside seven other researchers. The company emerged from stealth in May 2026, having raised more than $650 million at a $4.65 billion valuation from investors including GV (formerly Google Ventures), Greycroft, Nvidia, and AMD.

In September 2026, PublicAffairs published Socher's first book, The Eureka Machine: Why AI Is the Key to Unlocking a New Era of Scientific Discoveries, which argues that AI will accelerate the pace of science. The book debuted at No. 17 on USA Today's Best-selling Books.
