= Sven Voelpel =

German organizational theorist

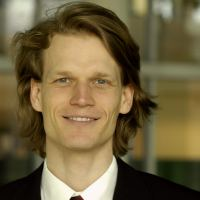
Sven Voelpel.

Sven Constantin Voelpel (born October 13, 1973 in Munich) is a German organizational theorist and Professor of Business Administration at the School of Humanities and Social Sciences at Jacobs University in Bremen, Germany, known for his work in the field of strategic management, business models and knowledge management.

== Biography ==
Voelpel received his MA in economics, social sciences, and business administration from the University of Augsburg in 1999, and his PhD from the University of St. Gallen in Switzerland in 2003.

Voepel started his academic career as post-graduate at Harvard University in 2003, and continued his research at Oxford University until 2008. In the year 2003-2004 he was associate professor at the University of Groningen, and in the Norwegian School of Economics. In 2004 he moved to the Jacobs University Bremen, where he was appointed Professor of Business Administration.

In 2007, Voelpel founded the WDN - WISE Demographics Network in Bremen (Germany) and has been the director ever since. The WDN provides specific and scientific solutions to demography-related personnel issues in its partner companies.

Voelpel has served as the editorial board member for the Journal of Change Management (2004-2010), the Journal of Knowledge Management (2004-2006), and has been the member of editorial board for Organization Studies since 2008.

== Work ==
Voelpel's research focus on the fields of leadership, team effectiveness, knowledge management and change management, demographic and diversity management.

His article titled "The rise of knowledge towards attention management" has been recognized as one of the citations classics in Knowledge Management field based on the number of citations it received. In 2009 and 2012, he was ranked among the top 100 researchers under 40 years of age by Handelsblatt. He was also ranked, by individual productivity, the 33rd place of KM/IC Researchers.

As the founding director of the WDN, Voelpel's research in demographic leadership has been positively influencing the working conditions of millions of employees in the partner companies of the WDN, including Daimler AG, Deutsche Bahn, and Deutsche Bank etc. In 2013, the WDN initiated competition program, the "Intergenerational Competence and Qualification Program", had been carried out by the Federal Ministry of Education and Research (Germany) (BMBF), in search of innovative solutions to the demographic change in the workforce.

Voelpel's latest publication of the book Mentale, emotionale und körperliche Fitness reveals his studies on the well-being and self-efficacy of individuals. The book received positive reviews on Magazin für Gesundheit und Wohlbefinden – Gesund … of Die Zeit, and was published in 650,000 copies.

== Selected publications ==
- Davenport, T.; Leibold, M.; Voelpel, S. (2006). Strategic management in the innovation economy. Strategy approaches and tools for dynamic innovation capabilities. New York: Wiley. (Prefaces by Klaus Jacobs and Heinrich von Pierer; CEO Siemens AG)
- Leibold, M.; Voelpel, S. (2006). Managing the aging workforce: Challenges and solutions. New York: Wiley.

Articles, a selection:

- Biemann, Torsten; Cole, Michael S.; Voelpel, Sven (2012). "Within-group agreement: On the use (and misuse) of rWG and rWG(J) in leadership research and some best practice guidelines". Leadership Quarterly. 23 (1): 66–80. doi:10.1016/j.leaqua.2011.11.006.
- Kearney, Eric; Gebert, Diether; Voelpel, Sven C. (2009). "When and how diversity benefits teams: the importance of team members need for cognition". Academy of Management Journal. 52 (3): 581–598. doi:10.5465/amj.2009.41331431. S2CID 147483114.
- Voelpel, Sven C.; Eckhoff, Robert A.; Förster, Jens (2008). "David against Goliath? Group size and bystander effects in virtual knowledge sharing". Human Relations. 61 (2): 273–297. doi:10.1177/0018726707087787. S2CID 73523780.
- Nonaka, Ikujiro; von Krogh, Georg; Voelpel, Sven (2006). "Organizational knowledge creation theory: Evolutionary paths and future advances". Organization Studies. 27 (8): 1179–1208. doi:10.1177/0170840606066312. S2CID 145111375.
- Voelpel, Sven C.; Dous, Malte; Davenport, Thomas H. (2005). "Five steps to creating a global knowledge sharing system: Siemens Share-Net". Academy of Management Executive. 19 (2): 9–23. doi:10.5465/ame.2005.16962590.
- Davenport, Thomas H.; Völpel, Sven C. (2001). "The rise of knowledge towards attention management". Journal of Knowledge Management. 5 (3): 212–222. doi:10.1108/13673270110400816.
