= Blšanka =

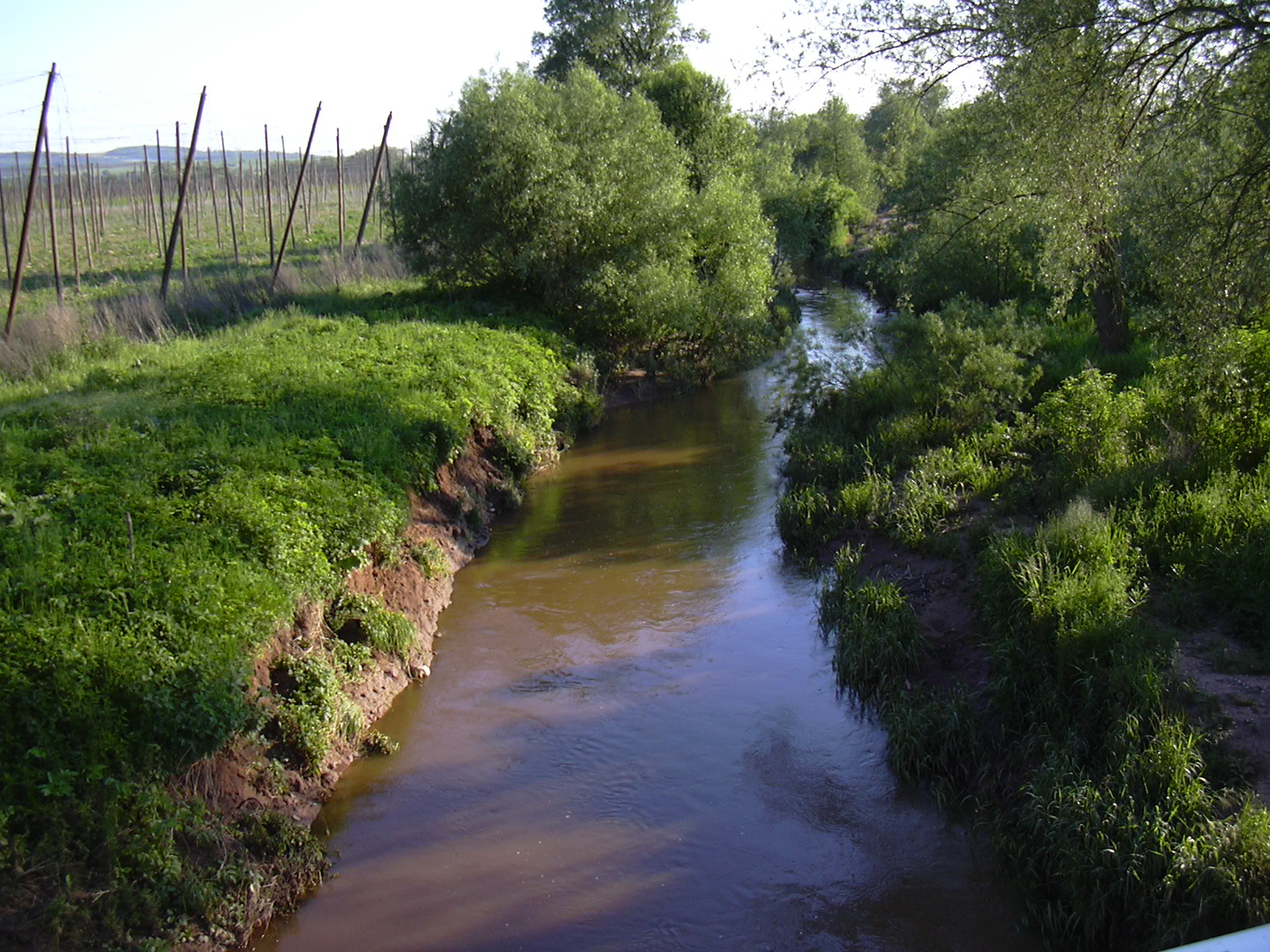
- The Blšanka in Blšany-Liběšovice

Location
- Country: Czech Republic
- Regions: Ústí nad Labem; Karlovy Vary

Physical characteristics
- Source
  - location: Hradiště Military Training Area, Doupov Mountains
  - coordinates: 50°11′13″N 13°12′38″E
  - elevation: 684 m (2,244 ft)
- Mouth
  - location: Ohře
  - coordinates: 50°19′6″N 13°36′34″E
  - elevation: 189 m (620 ft)
- Length: 50.8 km (31.6 mi)
- Basin size: 482.7 km^{2} (186.4 sq mi)
- Discharge
  - average: 1.05 m^{3}/s (37 cu ft/s) near estuary

Basin features
- Progression: Ohře→ Elbe→ North Sea

The Blšanka (Czech pronunciation: [ˈbl̩ʃanka]) is a river in the Czech Republic, a right tributary of the Ohře River. It flows through the Ústí nad Labem and Karlovy Vary regions. It is 50.8 km (31.6 mi) long.

== Etymology ==
The river is named after the town of Blšany.

== Characteristic ==
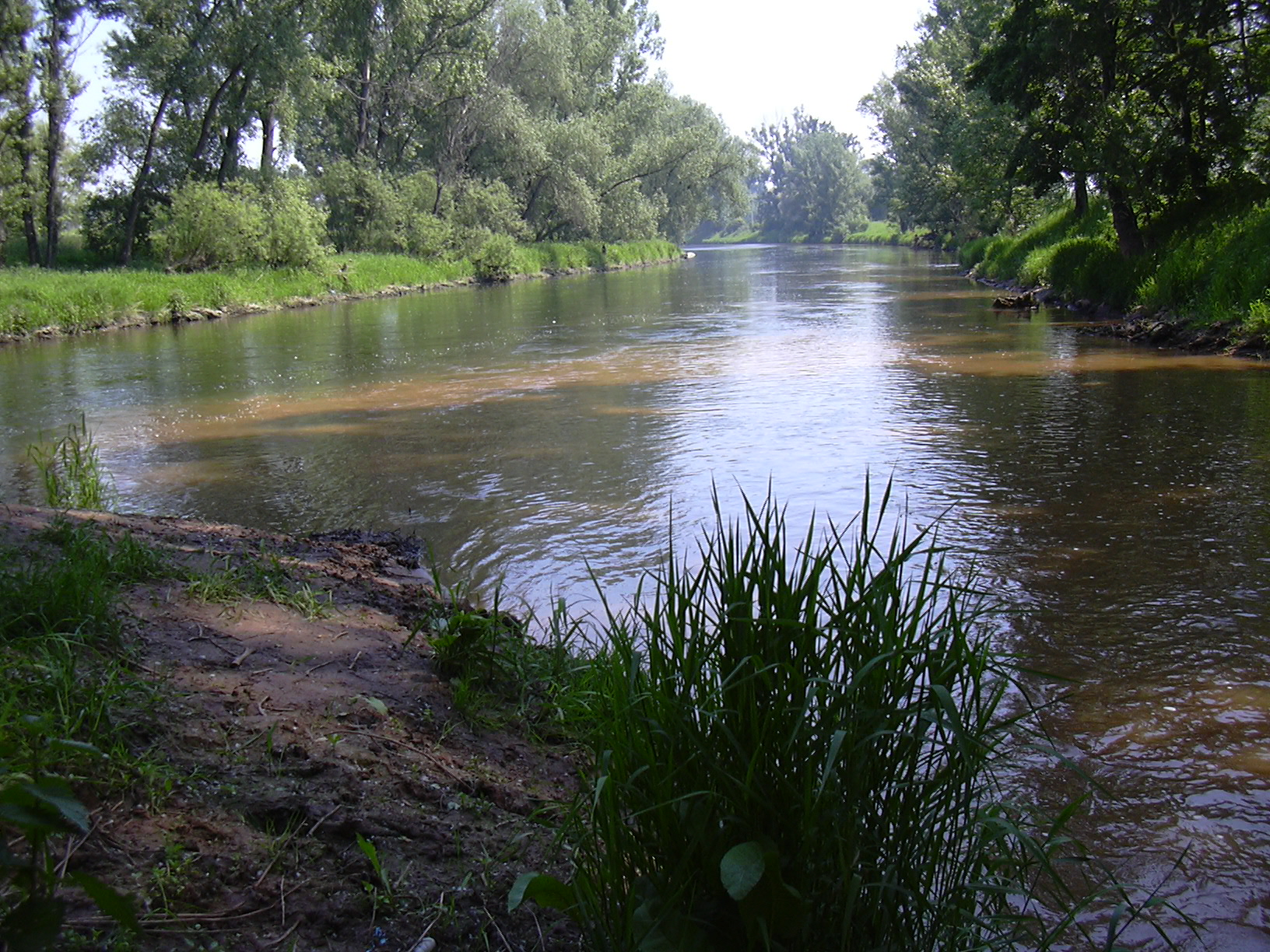
Confluence of the Blšanka and Ohře

The Blšanka originates in the southern part of the Hradiště Military Training Area in the Doupov Mountains at an elevation of 684 m (2,244 ft) and flows to Zálužice, where it enters the Ohře River at an elevation of 189 m (620 ft). It is 50.8 km (31.6 mi) long. Its drainage basin has an area of 482.7 km^{2} (186.4 sq mi).

The longest tributaries of the Blšanka are:

Tributary	Length (km)	Side
Mlýnecký potok	18.1	left
Podvinecký potok	17.8	right
Očihovecký potok	13.8	right
Radičeveská strouha	13.4	left
Klučecký potok	12.9	right
Černocký potok	12.6	right
Podhora	10.5	left
Liběšický potok	9.5	right

== Bodies of water ==
There are 257 bodies of water in the basin area. The largest of them is the Blatno fishpond with an area of 30 ha (74 acres). There are no fishponds or reservoirs built directly on the Blšanka.

== Course ==
There are no notable settlements on the river. The largest settlement on the Blšanka is the town of Kryry. The river flows through the Hradiště Military Training Area and through the municipal territories of Valeč, Lubenec, Vroutek, Kryry, Očihov, Blšany, Libořice, Měcholupy, Holedeč, Liběšice and Zálužice.

== Use ==
Trout fishing is allowed in a 22.66 km (14.08 mi) long section on the upper course.

== Floods ==
The largest floods on the Blšanka (monitored since 1905) were in 1956, when the water level rose to 280 cm (110 in). The most devastating flash floods were in 1872, when they killed over 100 people.

== See also ==
- List of rivers of the Czech Republic
