= Valeč =

Valeč may refer to places in the Czech Republic:

- Valeč (Karlovy Vary District), a municipality and village
- Valeč (Třebíč District), a municipality and village
