= Želeč =

Želeč may refer to places in the Czech Republic:

- Želeč (Prostějov District), a municipality and village in the Olomouc Region
- Želeč (Tábor District), a municipality and village in the South Bohemian Region
- Želeč, a village and part of Malá Skála in the Liberec Region
- Želeč, a village and part of Měcholupy (Louny District) in the Ústí nad Labem Region
