= Vroutek =

- Town
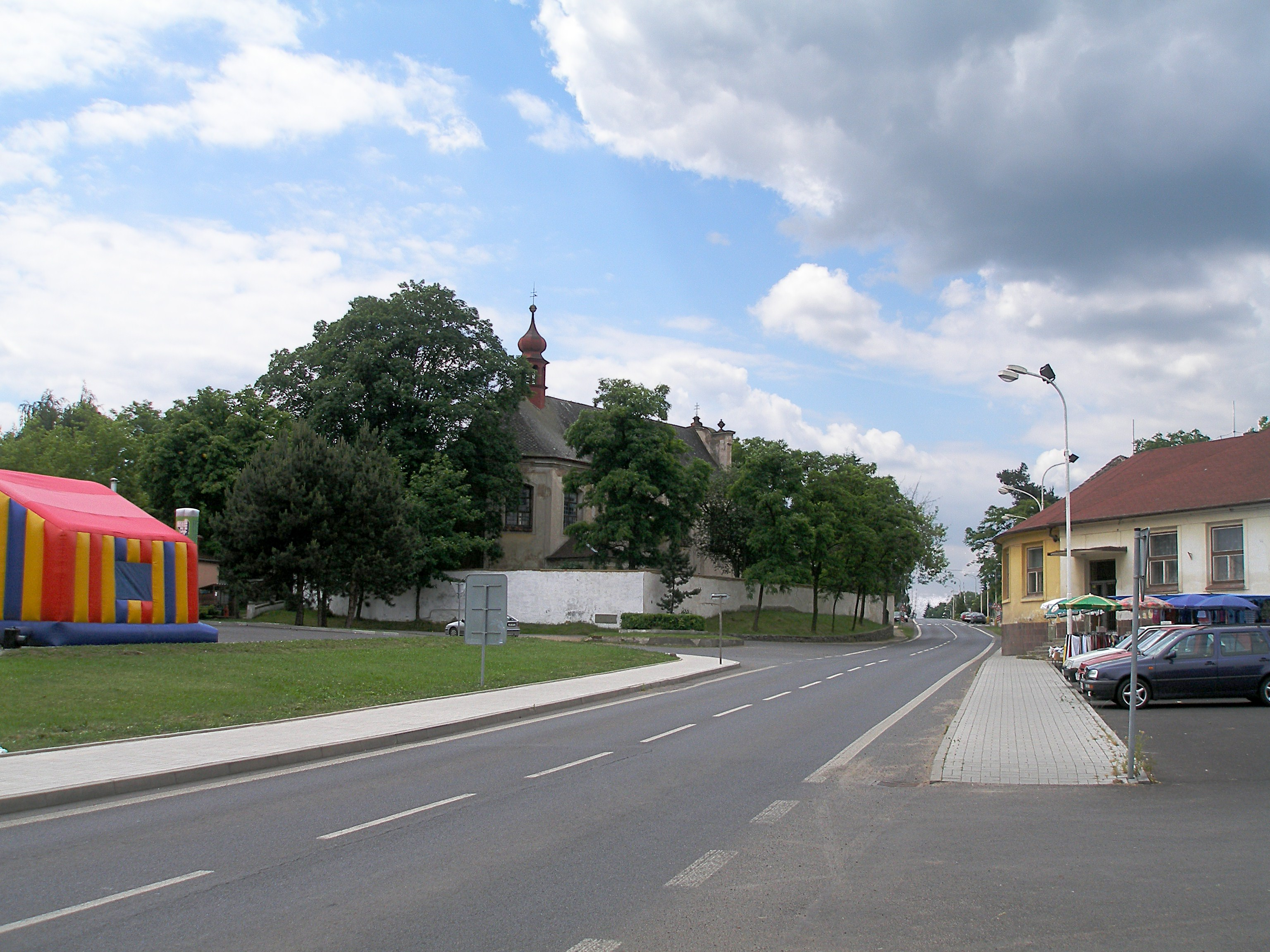
- Church of Saint John the Baptist

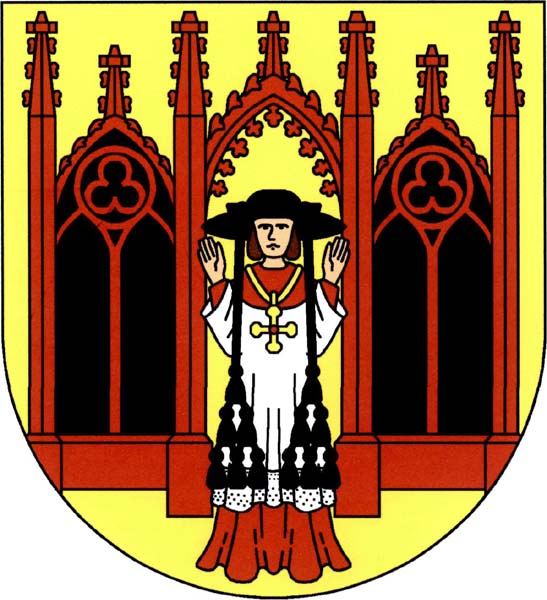
- Flag Coat of arms

- Location in the Czech Republic
- Coordinates: 50°13′20″N 13°28′35″E
- Country: Czech Republic
- Region: Ústí nad Labem
- District: Louny
- First mentioned: 1227

Government
  - Mayor: Jaromír Kubelka (ANO)

Area
  - Total: 52.68 km^{2} (20.34 sq mi)
- Elevation: 332 m (1,089 ft)

Population (2026-01-01)
  - Total: 1,860
  - Density: 35.3/km^{2} (91.4/sq mi)
- Time zone: UTC+1 (CET)
  - Summer (DST): UTC+2 (CEST)
- Postal codes: 439 82, 441 01
- Website: www.vroutek.net

Vroutek (Czech pronunciation: [ˈvroutɛk]; German: Rudig) is a town in Louny District in the Ústí nad Labem Region of the Czech Republic. It has about 1,900 inhabitants.

== Administrative division ==
Vroutek consists of eight municipal parts (in brackets population according to the 2021 census):

- Vroutek (1,538)
- Lužec (25)
- Mlýnce (59)
- Mukoděly (17)
- Skytaly (32)
- Vesce (4)
- Vidhostice (94)
- Vrbička (21)

== Etymology ==
The name Vroutek is probably derived from the older Czech dialectal word vrutice, which meant 'spring', 'fast-flowing stream'.

== Geography ==
Vroutek is located about 35 kilometres (22 mi) southwest of Louny and 48 km (30 mi) north of Plzeň. The eastern part of the municipal territory with the town proper lies in the Rakovník Uplands. The western part lies in the Doupov Mountains and includes the highest point of Vroutek, the hill Skytalský vrch at 552 m (1,811 ft) above sea level. The Blšanka River flows through the southern part of the territory.

== History ==
The first written mention of Vroutek is from 1227, when the village was owned by Kojata IV Hrabišic. In the 14th century, it was acquired by the monastery in Postoloprty and sometime during that time it was promoted to a town. Before the Thirty Years' War, it was owned by various noble families, including the Lobkowicz family. Most of the town was destroyed by the fire in 1599. The Czernin family acquired Vroutek in 1630 and annexed it to the Petrohrad estate.

In 1645, during the Thirty Years' War, Vroutek was looted and destroyed by the Swedish army. For more than ten years, most of the houses remained abandoned. Then the town was resettled by ethnic Germans.

== Demographics ==
Historical population

Year	Pop.	±%
1869	2,670	—
1880	3,076	+15.2%
1890	3,047	−0.9%
1900	3,331	+9.3%
1910	3,386	+1.7%

Year	Pop.	±%
1921	3,221	−4.9%
1930	3,421	+6.2%
1950	1,938	−43.3%
1961	2,169	+11.9%
1970	1,839	−15.2%

Year	Pop.	±%
1980	1,942	+5.6%
1991	1,922	−1.0%
2001	1,877	−2.3%
2011	1,880	+0.2%
2021	1,790	−4.8%

Source: Censuses

== Transport ==
Vroutek is located on the railway line Plzeň–Most.

== Culture ==
Vroutek is home to several open-air events, including the Rock for Churchill festival.

== Sights ==
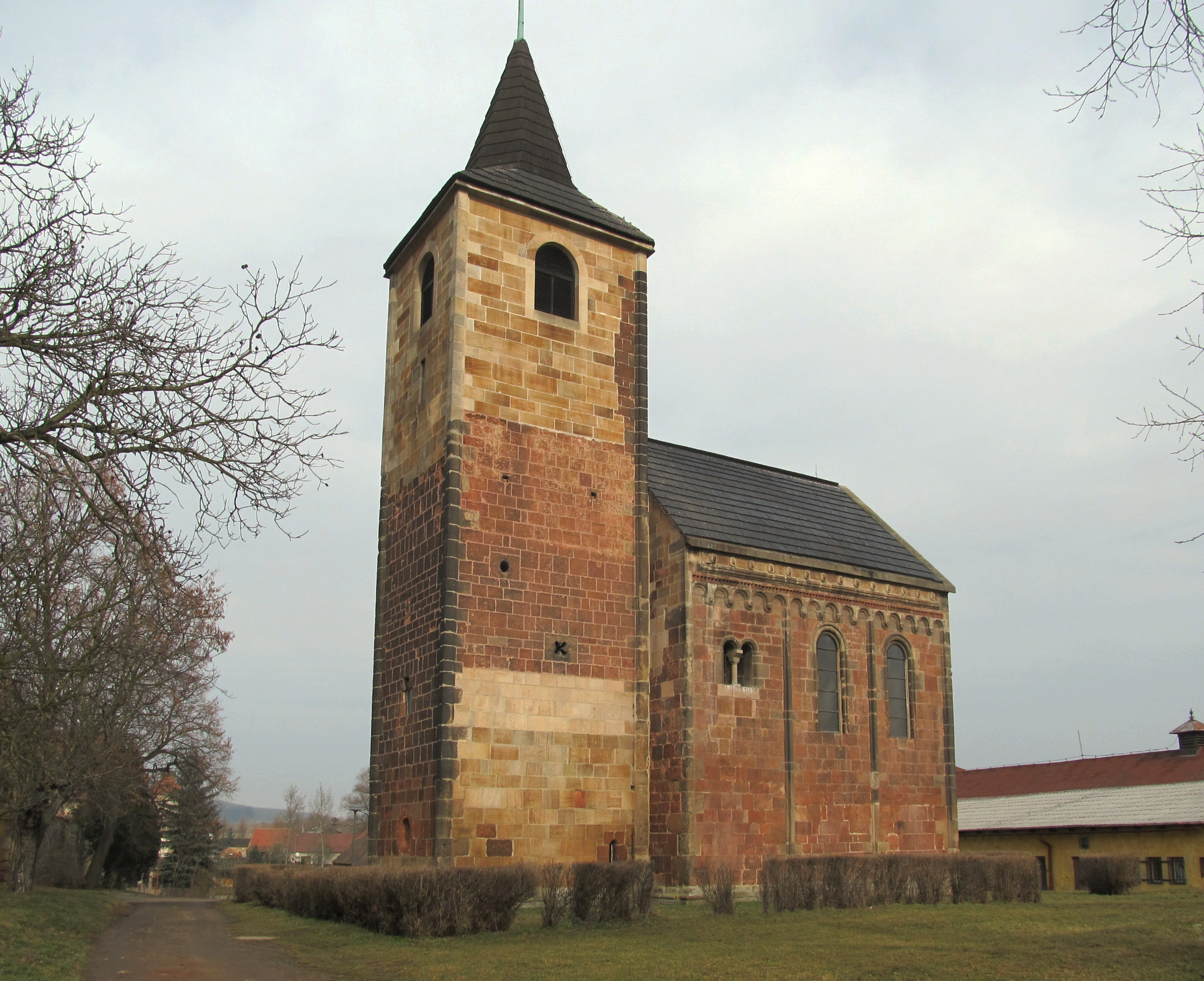
Church of Saint James the Great

The Church of Saint James the Great is a Romanesque building from the 1220s, modified at the end of the 16th century. It belongs to the most valuable monuments in the region. In the Middle Ages, it formed a fortified complex together with a stronghold.

The Church of Saint John the Baptist was built in the Baroque style in 1726.
