= Valeč (Karlovy Vary District) =

- Municipality
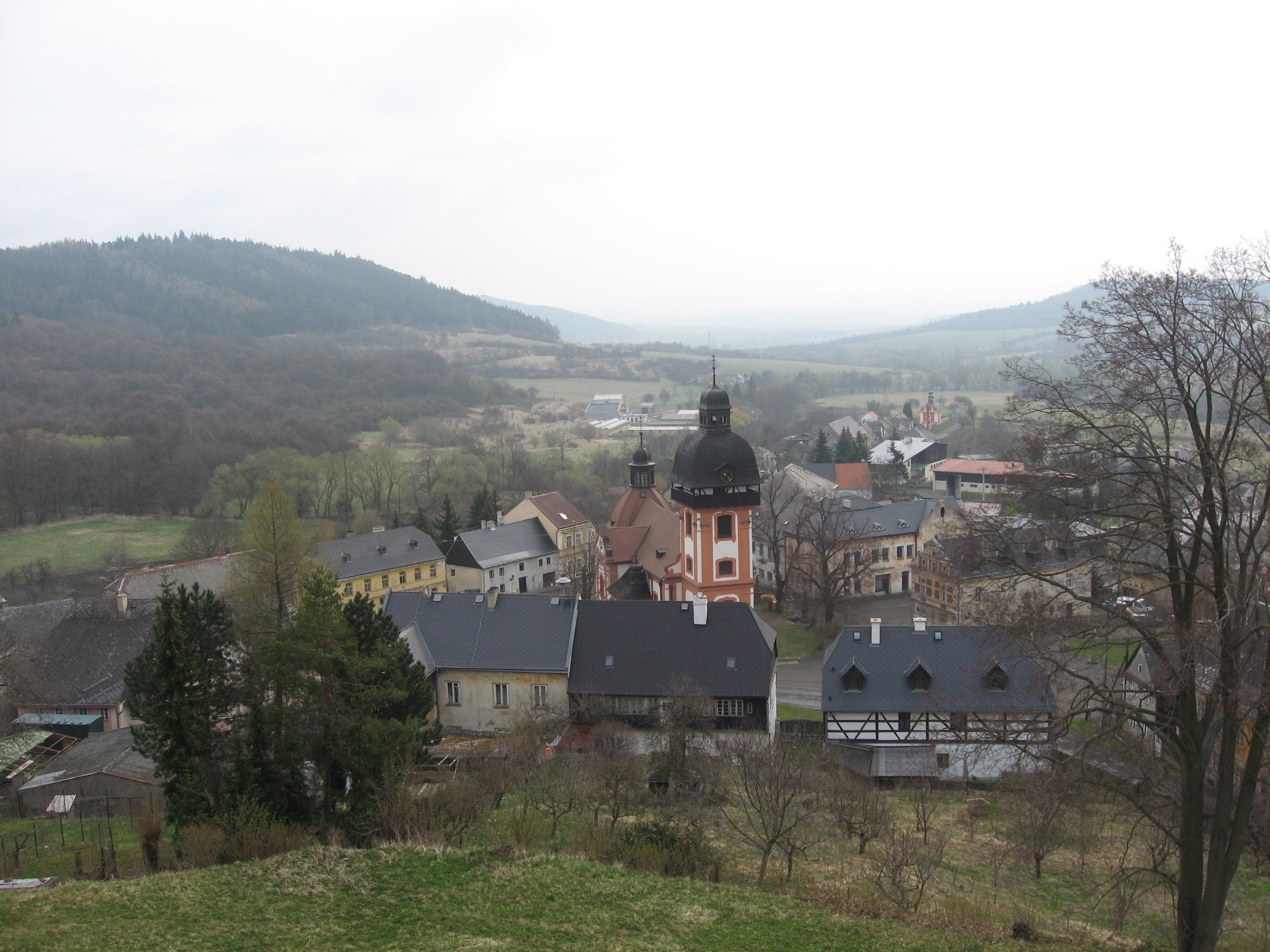
- Panorama of Valeč

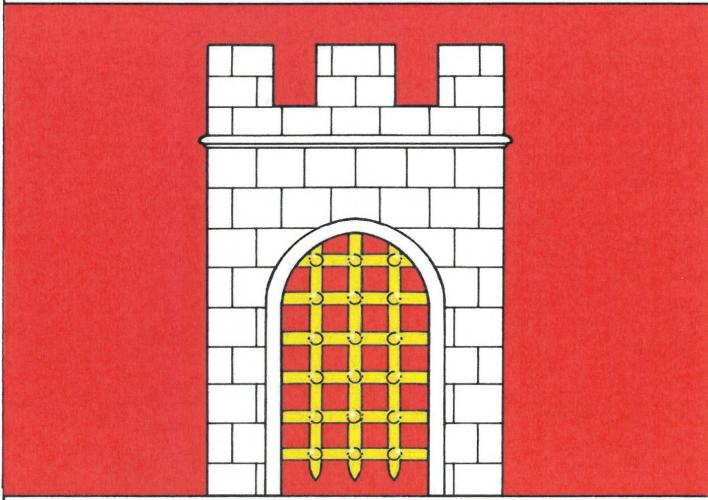
- Flag Coat of arms

- Location in the Czech Republic
- Coordinates: 50°10′27″N 13°15′17″E
- Country: Czech Republic
- Region: Karlovy Vary
- District: Karlovy Vary
- First mentioned: 1358

Area
  - Total: 23.66 km^{2} (9.14 sq mi)
- Elevation: 533 m (1,749 ft)

Population (2026-01-01)
  - Total: 320
  - Density: 14/km^{2} (35/sq mi)
- Time zone: UTC+1 (CET)
  - Summer (DST): UTC+2 (CEST)
- Postal codes: 364 52, 364 53
- Website: www.valec.cz

Valeč (German: Waltsch) is a municipality and village in Karlovy Vary District in the Karlovy Vary Region of the Czech Republic. It has about 300 inhabitants. The village centre is well preserved and is protected as an urban monument zone.

== Administrative division ==
Valeč consists of five municipal parts (in brackets population according to the 2021 census):

- Valeč (261)
- Jeřeň (13)
- Kostrčany (33)
- Nahořečice (21)
- Velký Hlavákov (35)

== Etymology ==
The name is derived from the personal name Válek (a variation of the name Valentin), who resided here.

== Geography ==
Valeč is located about 27 kilometres (17 mi) east of Karlovy Vary. It lies in the Doupov Mountains. The highest point of the municipal territory is the hill Prokopy, at 749 metres (2,457 ft) above sea level. The upper course of the Blšanka River flows through the western part of the territory.

== History ==
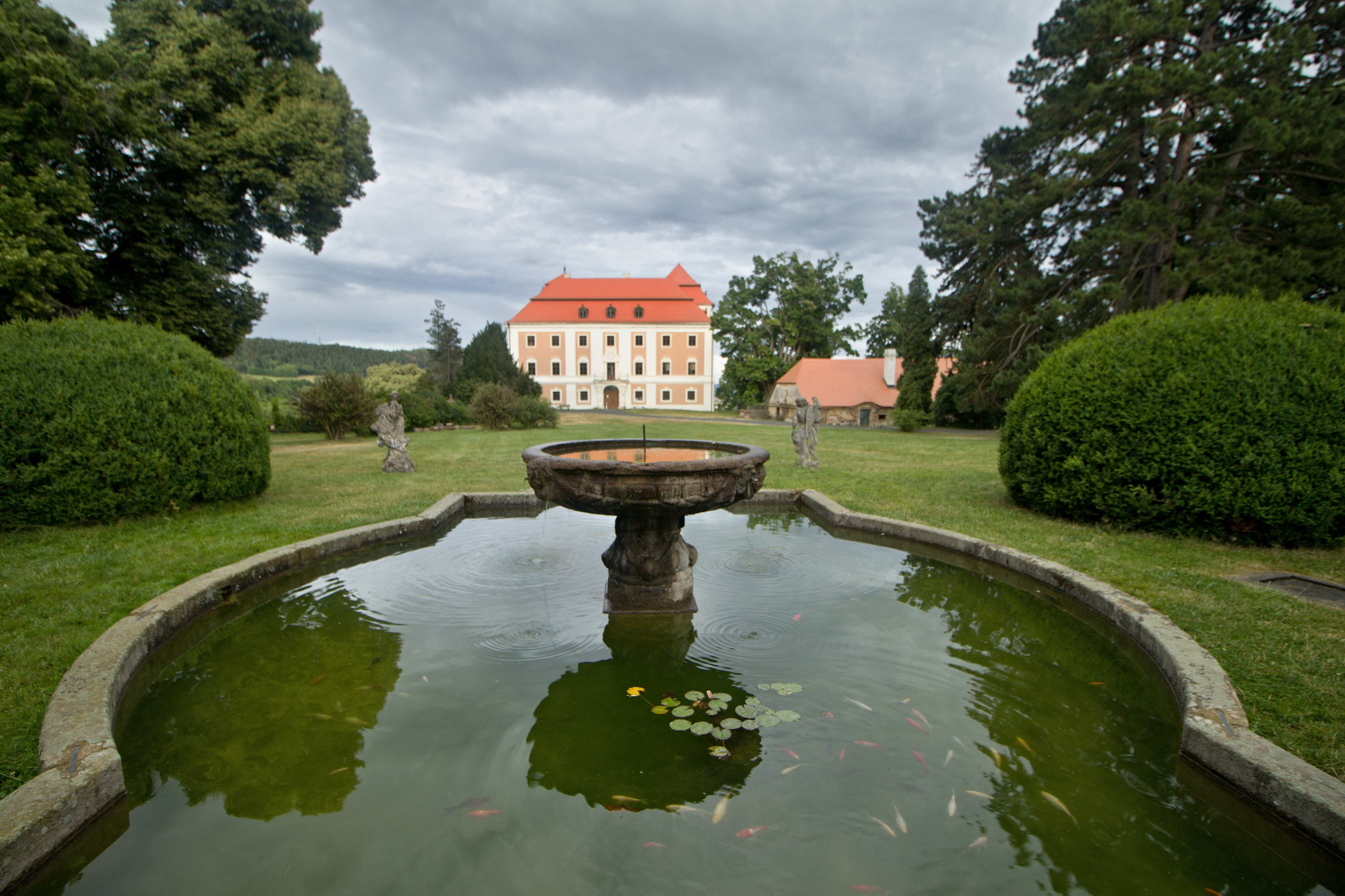
Valeč Castle

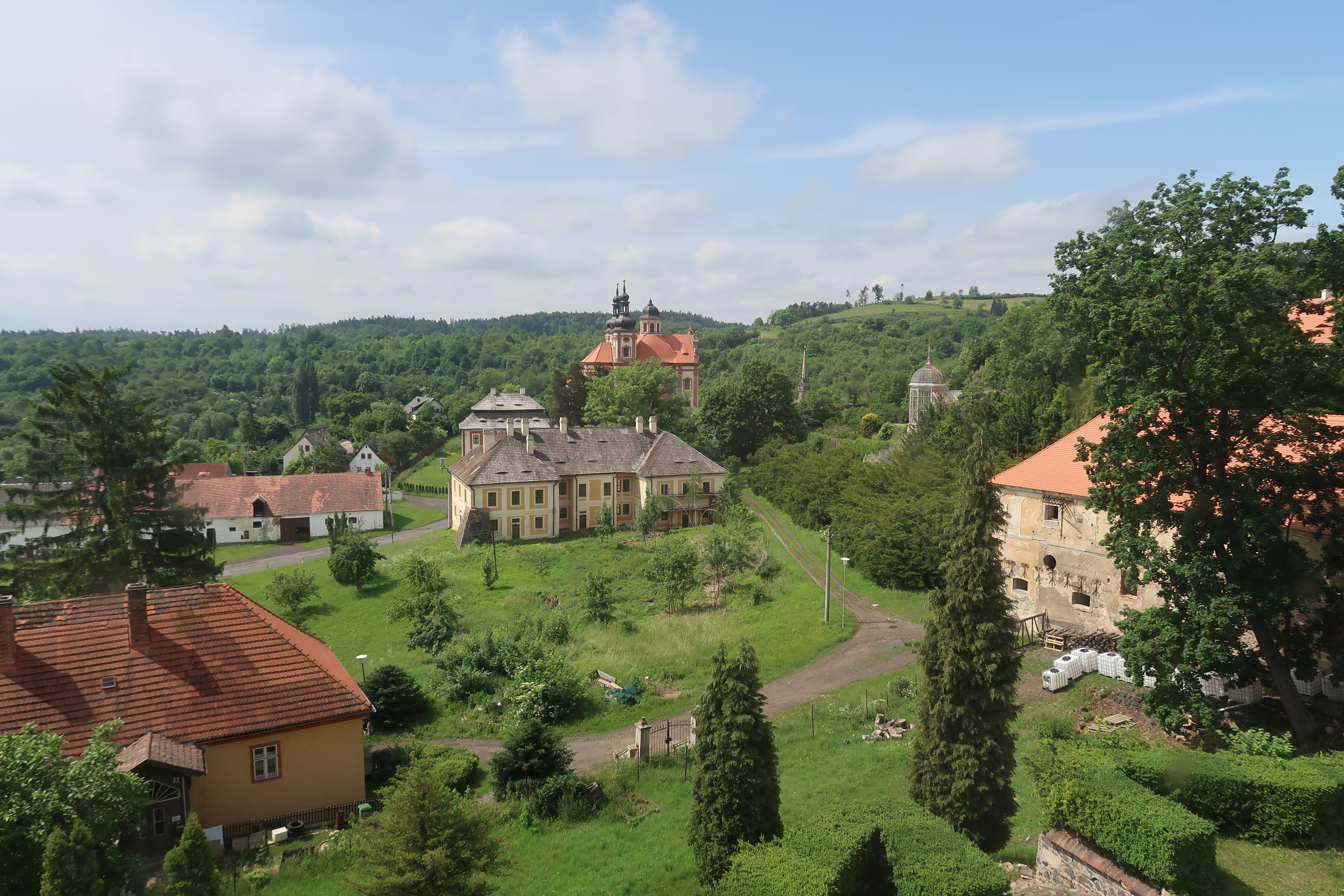
View from the castle

The first written mention of Valeč is from 1358, when Valeč was divided between brothers Beneš and Ctibor of Valeč. Other owners of the estate during the Middle Ages were: Jan Kladivo of Stebno 1368; Boreš of Osek 1371; Beneš of Buskovice from 1377 to 1416; Nevlas and Jan of Doupov 1416; Sezema of Doupov 1454; and Jan of Doupov of 1487.

The village was given municipal rights in December 1514, upon a request by Vladislaus II. In 1570, Christopher Štampach of Štampach bought Valeč. Václav Štampach of Štampach then built a Renaissance castle, whose appearance today is not known. After Václav Štampach joined the Bohemian Revolt and in 1622 left the country, the castle was confiscated. However, in 1623, Valeč was bought by Barbora Štampachová of Poutnov.

The castle underwent significant change in the time of Prince Johann Christoph Kager at the turn of the 17th and 18th century. In this period, the Renaissance castle was converted to a square two-story Baroque castle, led by architects Francesco Barelli, Antonio Bianno Rossa and after his death, John Christopher Tyll. He also laid out the castle garden, equipped it with theater, cascading fountain and sculptures by the renowned Matthias Braun. Near the castle is the Church of the Holy Trinity built by the architect G. A. Biana Rossou in the years 1710–1728. In its courtyard is also located the Holy Trinity Column by František Maxmilián Kaňka, created in 1725.

From 1721 to 1798, Valeč was owned by the Globen family. In 1798, it was acquired by the Knights of Weidenheim.

The castle underwent several modifications in the Neo-Renaissance and Neo-Baroque style. That is credited mainly to Earl Vincent Thurn Valssasin between 1895 and 1896. In 1937, Jan Larisch-Mönnich purchased Valeč, repairing the roof and cracks in the walls, and installing central heating. In 1945, based on the Beneš decrees, the palace was confiscated and handed over to the management of the organisation of political prisoners. In 1947, the Ministry of Agriculture allocated it to the Central Directorate of State Forests and Farms and it was then used as a home for Korean children and from the early fifties as a children's home. After a fire on 2 April 1976, the regional conservation centre in Plzeň took over management of the palace.

== Demographics ==
Historical population

Year	Pop.	±%
1869	1,771	—
1880	1,810	+2.2%
1890	1,789	−1.2%
1900	1,617	−9.6%
1910	1,573	−2.7%

Year	Pop.	±%
1921	1,487	−5.5%
1930	1,420	−4.5%
1950	696	−51.0%
1961	629	−9.6%
1970	589	−6.4%

Year	Pop.	±%
1980	508	−13.8%
1991	371	−27.0%
2001	367	−1.1%
2011	341	−7.1%
2021	363	+6.5%

Source: Censuses

== Transport ==
There are no railways or major roads passing through the municipality.

== Sights ==
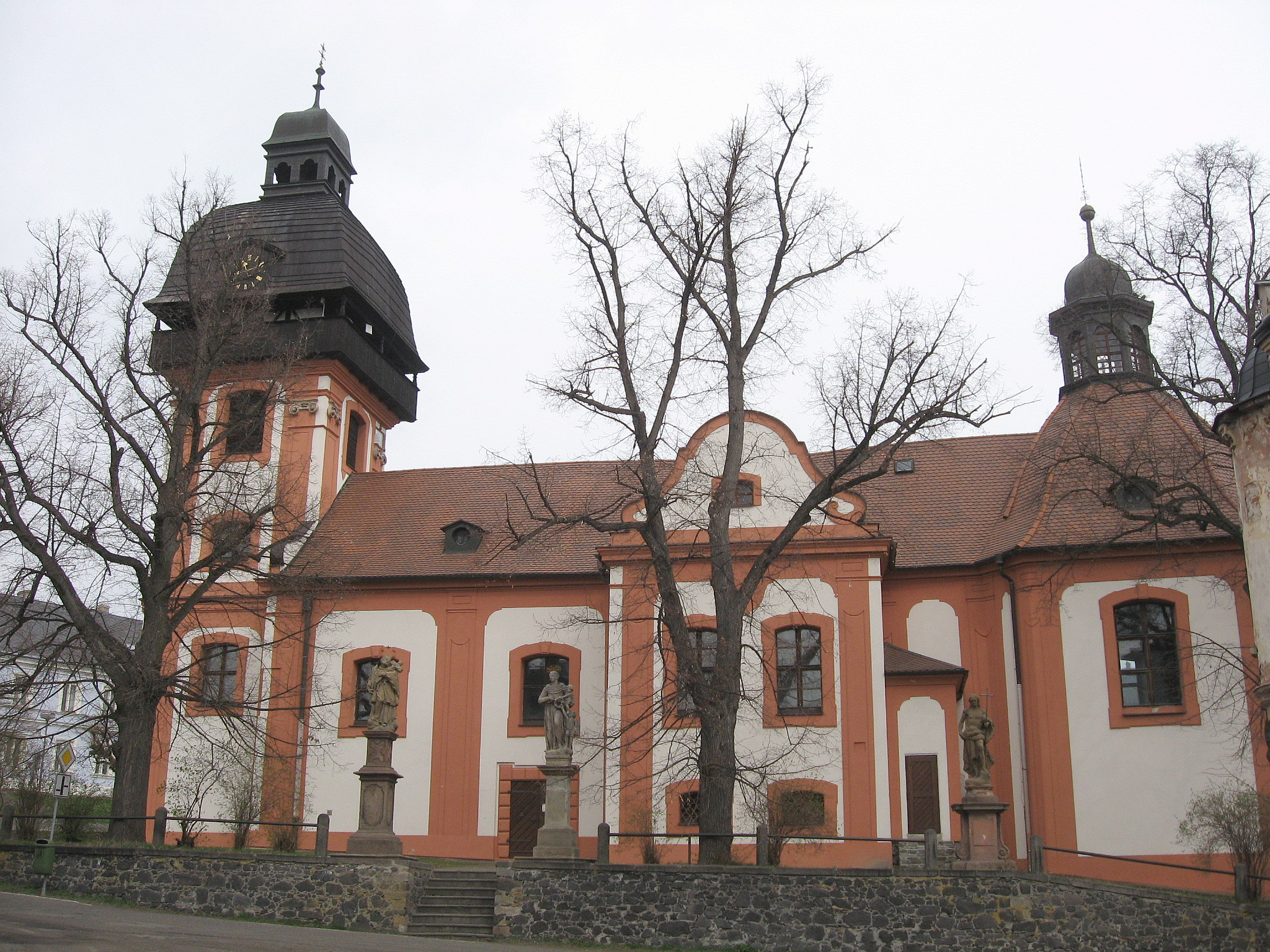
Church of the Nativity of Saint John the Baptist

The most important tourist destination is the Valeč Castle. Today the castle is owned by the state and offers guided tours.

The Church of the Nativity of Saint John the Baptist was originally built in the Gothic style in the mid-13th century. At the turn of the 16th and 17th centuries, it was renaissance rebuilt. Baroque modifications were made at the turn of the 17th and 18th centuries.

The Church of Our Lady of Sorrows is a cemetery church from 1751. It is a late Baroque building.

The Church of Saint Wenceslaus in Nahořečice was originally a Gothic church from the mid-14th century, which was completely rebuilt in the Baroque style in 1681–1698.

The Kostrčany Castle is a small valuable Baroque manor house. It was built on the site of an old Renaissance fortress and was first documented in 1725. Today it is privately owned.

== Twin towns – sister cities ==
Valeč is twinned with:

- Drebach, Germany

Valeč also has friendly relations with Neckargemünd in Germany and with Valeč (Třebíč District).
