= Dilsberg Castle =

- Bergfeste Dilsberg
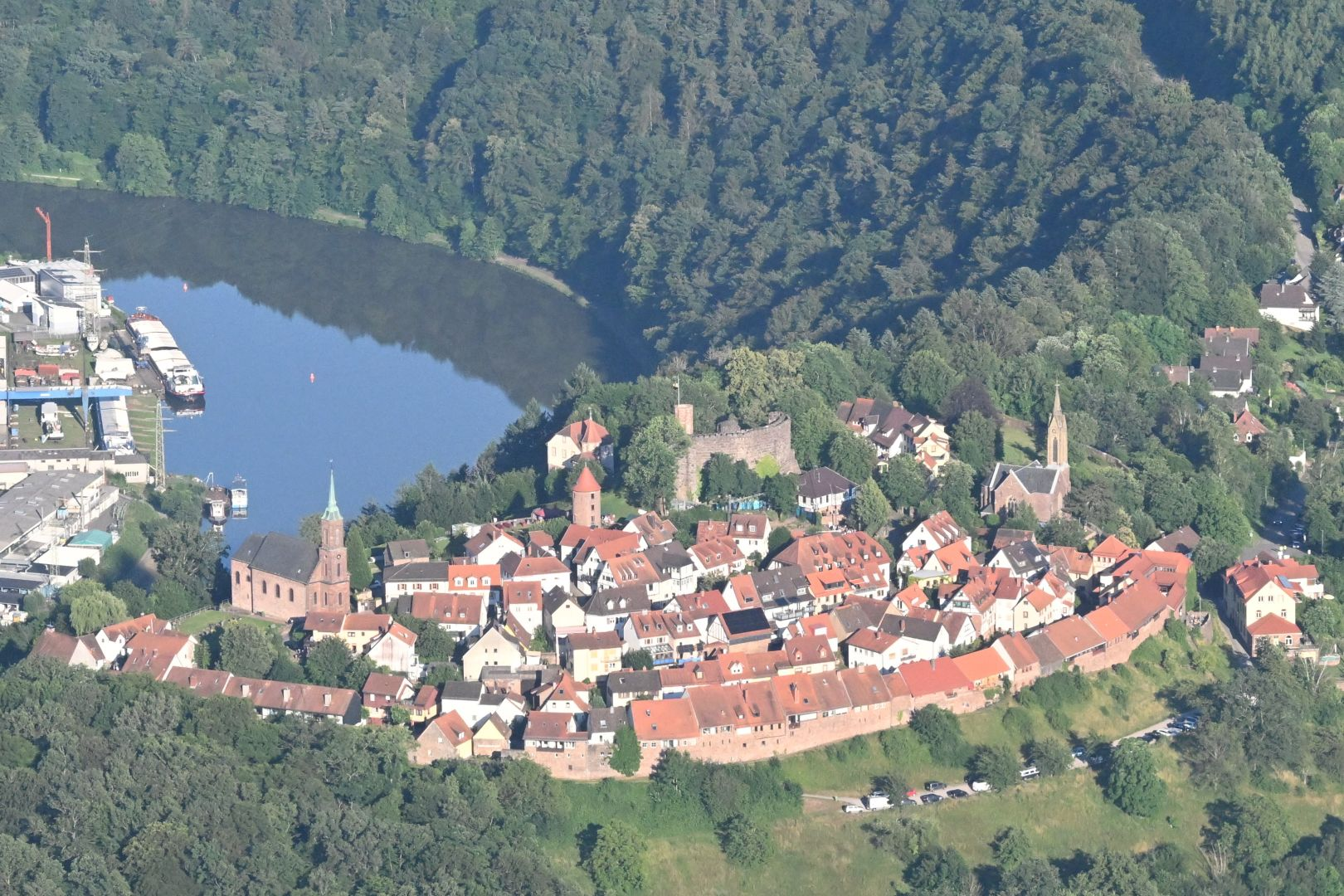
- Aerial view

Map and basic information
Location within Germany Dilsberg (Germany)
General information
Location	Neckargemünd, Germany
Coordinates	49°23′55″N 8°50′13″E

Website
- www.burgfeste-dilsberg.de

Dilsberg Castle (German: Bergfeste Dilsberg) is a ruined castle located in Neckargemünd, Germany. It was built by the counts of Lauffen in the 12th century, but in the 14th century became part of the Electorate of the Palatinate. The castle became an administrative center for the Electoral Palatinate and thus a target in the wars of the 17th and 18th centuries. In the 19th century, the castle fell into ruin and was used as a quarry. American writer Mark Twain visited the castle in the 1870s and wrote about it in A Tramp Abroad. As of 2020, Dilsberg Castle is administered by the heritage agency Staatliche Schlösser und Gärten Baden-Württemberg.

== History ==
Dilsberg Castle was constructed in the mid-12th century by the Counts of Lauffen to replace their castle at Wiesenbach. The castle was also intended to secure the power of the Counts of Lauffen over the area against that of the Heidelberg-based Electorate of the Palatinate. The Counts of Lauffen died out at the start of the 13th century, however, and the castle passed to the House of Dürn and then, in 1310, to the Palatinate. To solidify his own control over the area, Rupert I expanded the castle with recycled stone from the old curtain wall. Rupert I also established a town, Dilsberg, at the castle by moving nearby townspeople to the fortress to create new tax income. A garrison was assigned to the castle and the town would become an important administrative center in the Palatinate. It was given town rights in 1347, but in the long term Rupert I's plan failed as Dilsberg was isolated from important roadways. As siege weapons grew more powerful, the military importance of Dilsberg declined.

By the end of the 19th century, Dilsberg Castle had become the property of the government of Grand Duchy of Baden and was used as a prison. Around 1822, the castle was abandoned and became a public quarry. Beginning in the mid-19th century, Dilsberg Castle's ruins began appearing in the work of artists such as J. M. W. Turner, Carl Rottmann and Karl Weysser, and even in Mark Twain's work, when he wrote about a legendary tunnel under the castle in A Tramp Abroad. Public interest in the castle grew during the 20th century, inspiring tourism and prompting the reconstruction of some of the castle, and the restoration of Dilsberg's town center.

== Architecture ==
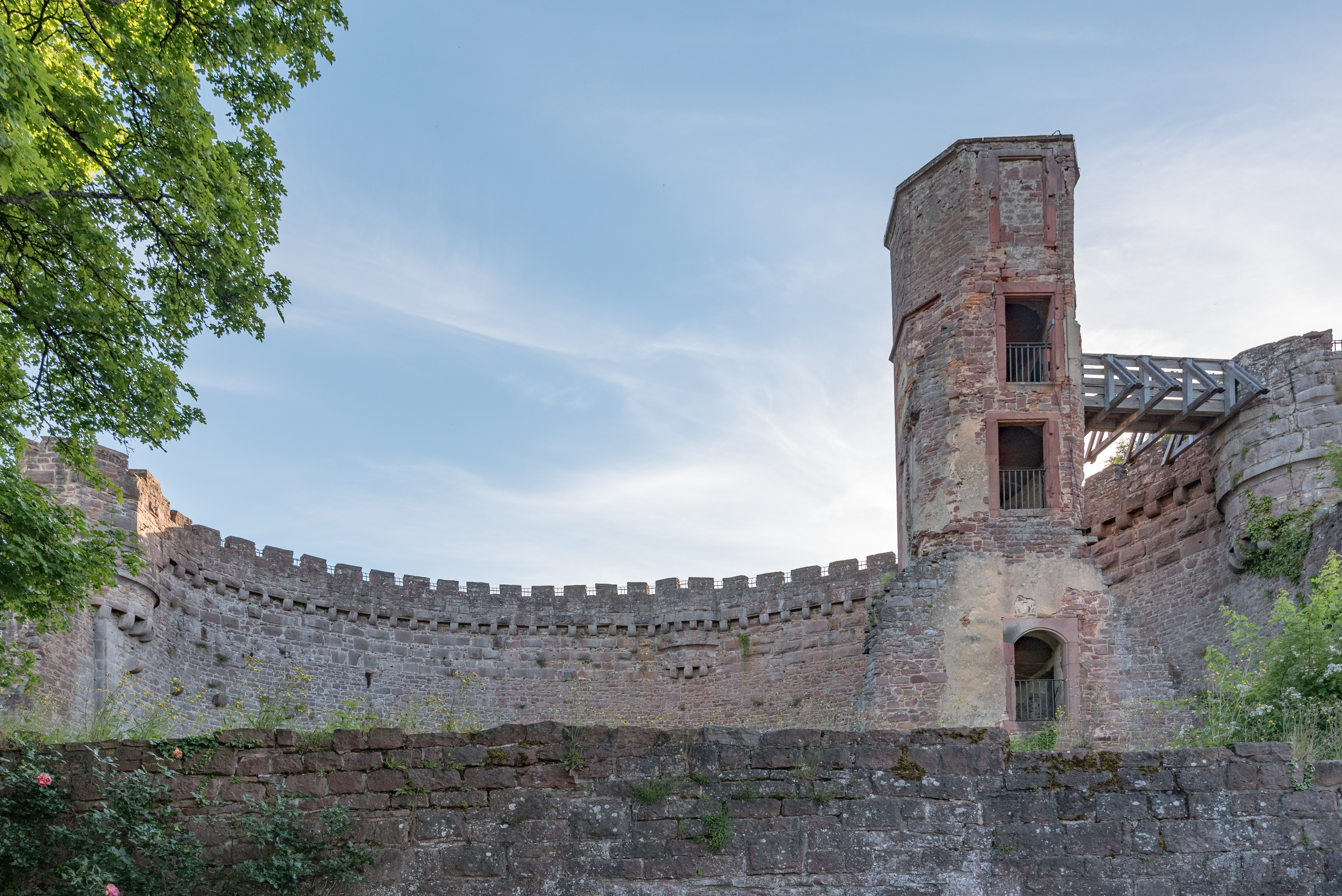
Inner bailey wall from within the bailey

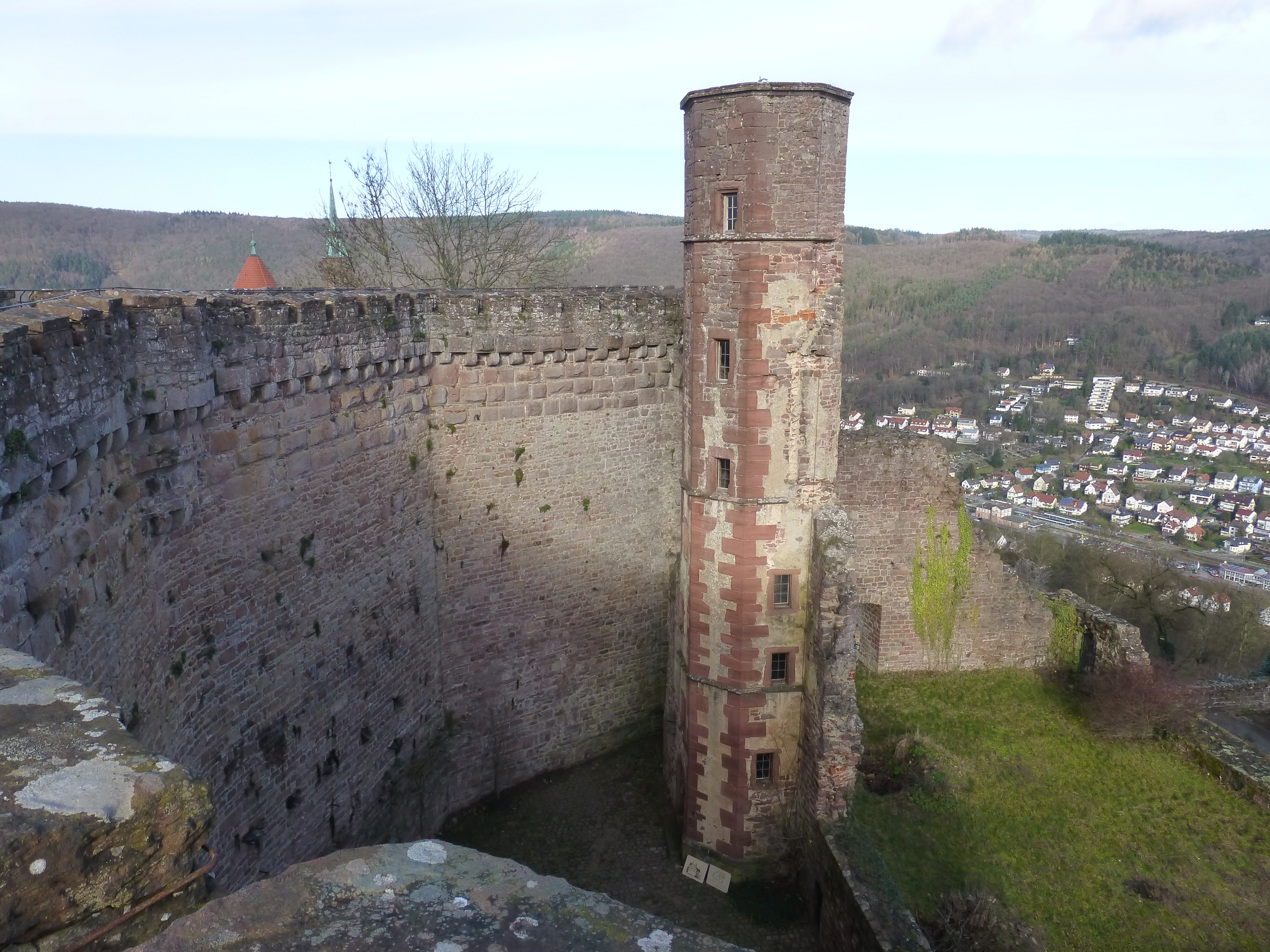
Staircase tower seen from atop the wall, from the south

The first iteration of Dilsberg Castle was a simple, oval-shaped hilltop castle with a moat, curtain wall, and tower house built in the mid-12th century. Towards the end of that century, they replaced the tower house with a keep and added a palas. The Palatinate greatly expanded the castle and from 1360 on built the present fortress. The Palatine castle had an outer bailey whose curtain wall was lined with a barracks, prison, tithe barn, stables, and granary. A garden was laid out on the site of the barracks.

Beyond two flanking towers was the inner bailey, surrounded by a 16-meter (52 ft) enceinte accessed by a staircase tower, both rebuilt around 1900. Within the inner bailey was a five-story palas, demolished in 1794 and survived only by its undercroft, called the Witch's Cellar (Hexenkeller). The cellar was once used as a students' prison by the University of Heidelberg. The nearby Commandant's House was built around 1550 in the outer bailey and became the garrison commander's residence in 1648. When the castle was demolished in 1822, the Commandant's House survived because it was privately owned at the time. It was purchased by the city of Neckargmünd in 1854 and thereafter used as the town hall, temporary housing, and a school from 1894 to 1982. When Neckargmünd could no longer afford the upkeep for the Commandant's House, it was purchased in 1996 by the local district-level government, who renovated it into a cultural center the following year.

The castle well, also in the inner bailey, is 46 meters (151 ft) deep. Nearby, and under the castle, is an adit and tunnel measuring 78 meters (256 ft) long. The well was dug in two phases; when the castle was first constructed the well was 21.5 metres (71 ft) deep and was then deepened between 1650 and 1680 for the castle's permanent garrison. The tunnels were also dug in the second phase to ventilate fumes from the well's mining, and then was filled up. They passed into local legend as a secret passageway until they were rediscovered by a German-American named Fritz von Briesen around 1900. 20 years before, Mark Twain wrote about the tunnels in A Tramp Abroad.

== See also ==
- List of castles in Baden-Württemberg
