= Neckargemünd =

- Town
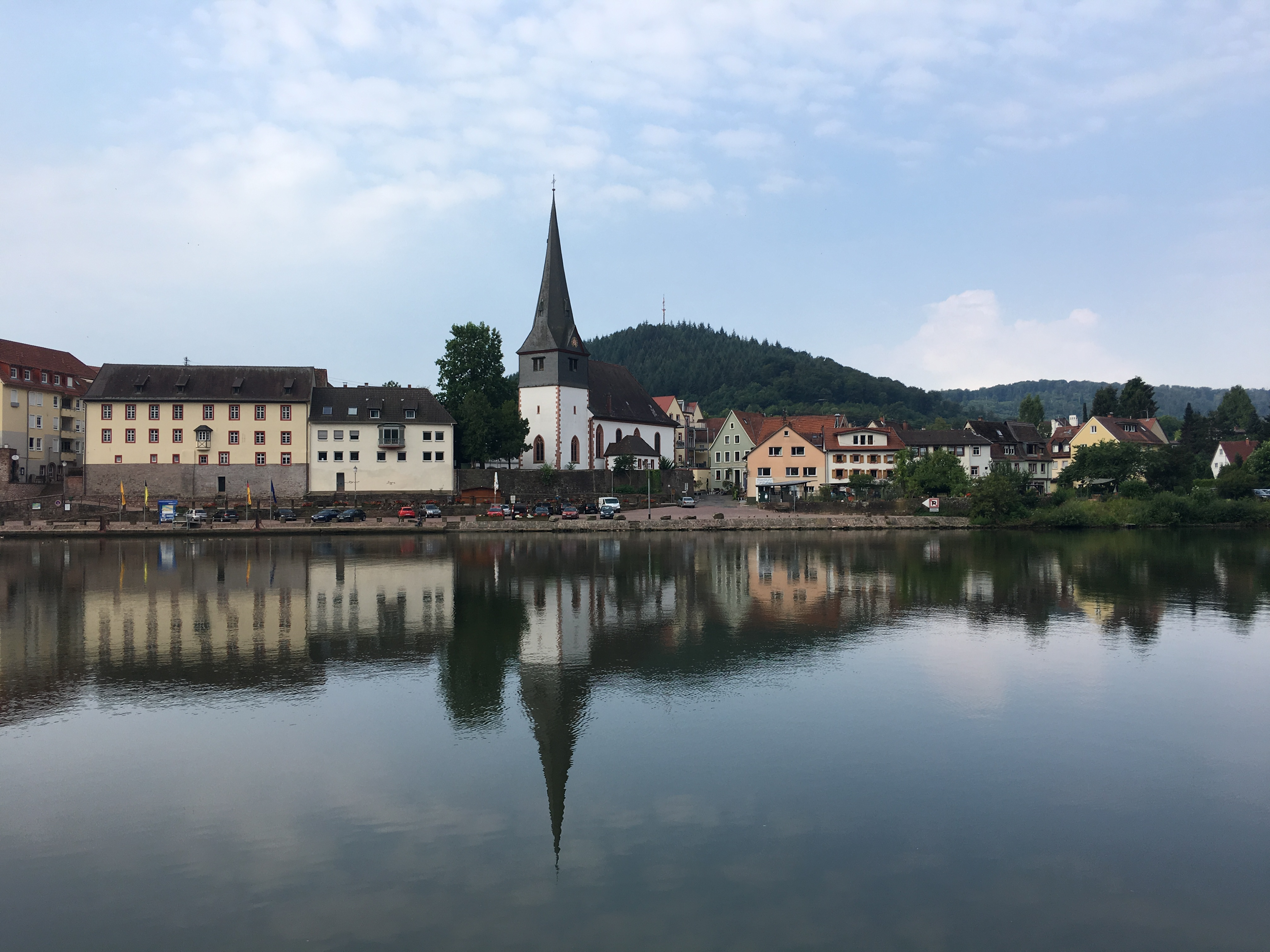
- View of the town

- Coat of arms

- Location of Neckargemünd within Rhein-Neckar-Kreis district
- Interactive map of Neckargemünd
- Location within Germany Location within Baden-Württemberg
- Coordinates: 49°23′38″N 08°47′51″E
- Country: Germany
- State: Baden-Württemberg
- Admin. region: Karlsruhe
- District: Rhein-Neckar-Kreis

Government
  - Mayor (2024–32): Jan Peter Seidel (Ind.)

Area
  - Total: 26.16 km^{2} (10.10 sq mi)
- Elevation: 127 m (417 ft)

Population (2025-12-31)
  - Total: 13,323
  - Density: 509.3/km^{2} (1,319/sq mi)
- Time zone: UTC+01:00 (CET)
  - Summer (DST): UTC+02:00 (CEST)
- Postal codes: 69151
- Dialling codes: 06223
- Vehicle registration: HD
- Website: www.neckargemuend.de

Neckargemünd (German pronunciation: [ˌnɛkaʁɡəˈmʏnt]; Palatine German: Neggergmin) is a town in Germany, in the district of Rhein-Neckar-Kreis, state of Baden-Württemberg. It lies on the Neckar, 10 km upriver from Heidelberg at the confluence with the river Elsenz. This confluence of the two rivers is the origin of the name, as Neckargemünd means confluence of the Neckar. As of 2006, there were 14,122 inhabitants.

== History ==
The region has been occupied by people for a half a million years as shown by the find of Homo heidelbergensis in nearby Mauer in 1907. Stone shards and stone axes have been found from the Early Stone Age. During Roman times the area was settled by Celts and Suebi. Grave stones from the 2nd and 3rd century in Kleingemünd show Celtic names. From the end of the 5th century the Franks held sway over the region. An iron spear tip and two iron arrow heads were left behind in Neckargemünd.

Neckargemünd was founded in the 10th century, most likely as a fishing village. Neckargemünd was first mentioned by name in documents in 988. Otto III, Holy Roman Emperor enfeoffed Hildebald, Bishop of Worms, with the royal forests around Wimpfen and Neckarbischofsheim. Neckargemünd was named as the northwest corner of this area: a loco Gemundi ubi Elisinzia fluvius influit Neccaro fluvio. The counts of Lauffen also played a role in the region after making Dilsberg the seat of their domain. Neckargemünd became a free town in 1286. In 1395 it passed to the elector palatine and, together with the surrounding district, became part of Baden in 1814.

== Population development ==
Neckargemünd with Kleingemünd

Year	1439	1577	1688	1727	1818	1852	1905	1939	1965
Population	295	855	550	877	1956	2702	2637	3862	8107

Neckargemünd with current boroughs

Year	1961	1970	1991	1995	2005	2010	2015
Population	10.120	11.763	14.562	14.559	14.280	13.905	13.369

== Boroughs ==
Neckargemünd includes a number of boroughs (Ortsteile) not part of the core settlement Neckargemünd.

- Kleingemünd (1 January 1907) – independent from 1860 until 1906
- Dilsberg (1 January 1973) - a small historic village with a medieval castle ruin, the village includes Neuhof, Dilsbergerhof and Rainbach
- Waldhilsbach (1 January 1974)
- Mückenloch (1 January 1975)

== Mayors ==
- 1855–1861: Georg Reibold
- 1862–1867: Julius Friedrich Menzer
- 1867–1873: Carl Heckmann
- 1873–1899: Carl Thilo
- 1899–1902: Carl Wittmann
- 1903–1909: Franz Heeg
- 1909–1910: Wilhelm Steinbrunn
- 1910–1917: Georg Schneider
- 1917–1919: Carl Kirchmayer
- 1919–1928: Dr. Emil Leist
- 1928–1939: Georg Müßig
- 1939–1942: Wilhelm Cloos
- 1942–1945: Gottfried Kramer (first vice mayor, then mayor)
- 1945–1948: Georg Lampertsdörfer
- 1948–1966: Heinrich Held (1948–1951 temporary)
- 1966–1984: Kurt Schieck
- 1984–2000: Oskar Schuster
- 2000-2016: Horst Althoff (CDU)
- 2016–2024: Frank Volk
- 2024-2032: Jan Peter Seidel

== Twin towns – sister cities ==
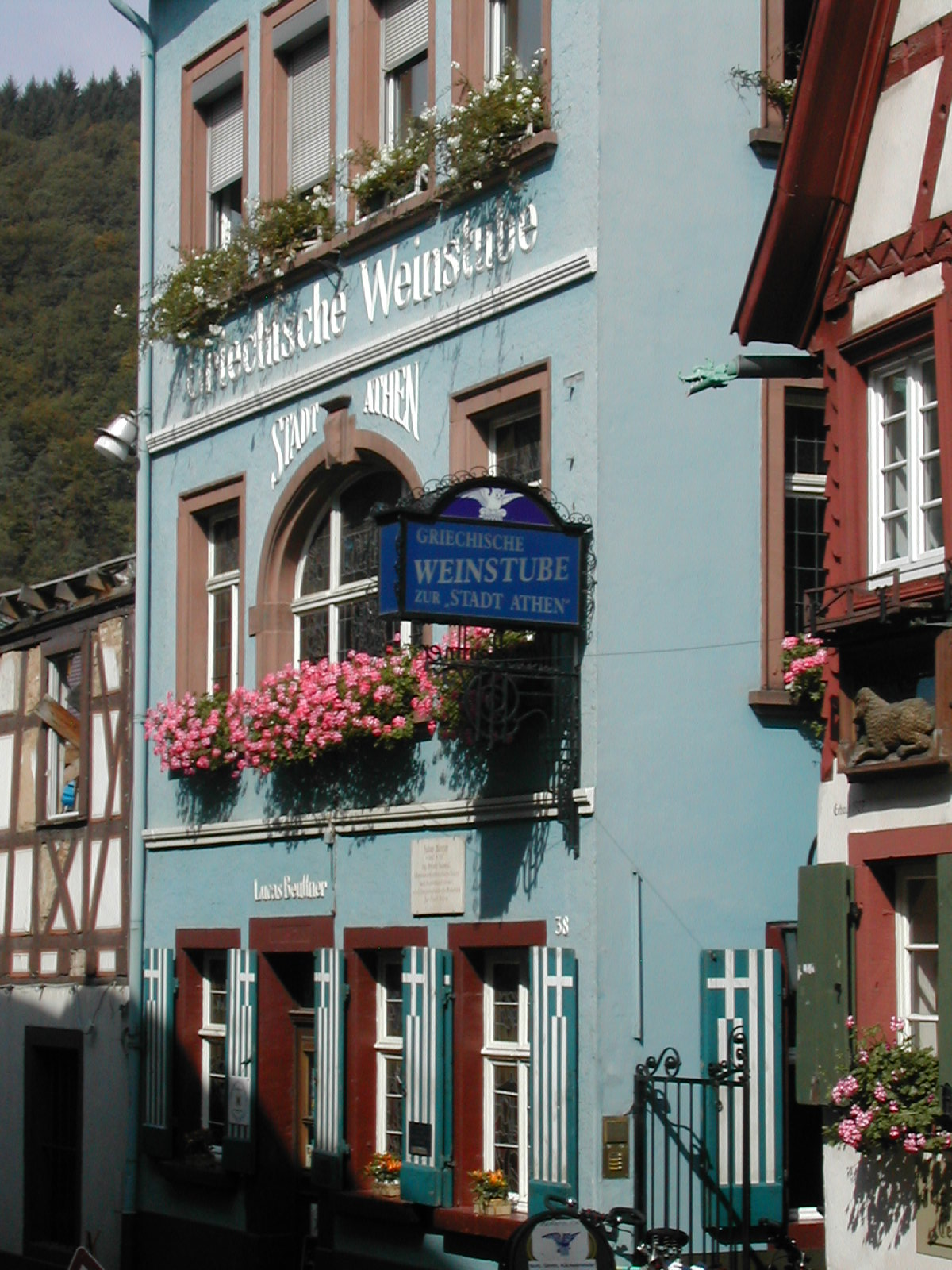
Greek tavern in Neckargemünd

Neckargemünd is twinned with:

- Evian-les-Bains, France (1970)
- Missoula, United States (1993)
- Jindřichův Hradec, Czech Republic (1996)
- Romeno, Italy (1996)

Neckargemünd also has friendly relations with Valeč in the Czech Republic.

== Notable people ==
- Rainer Ohlhauser (born 1941), footballer
