= Zálužice =

- Municipality
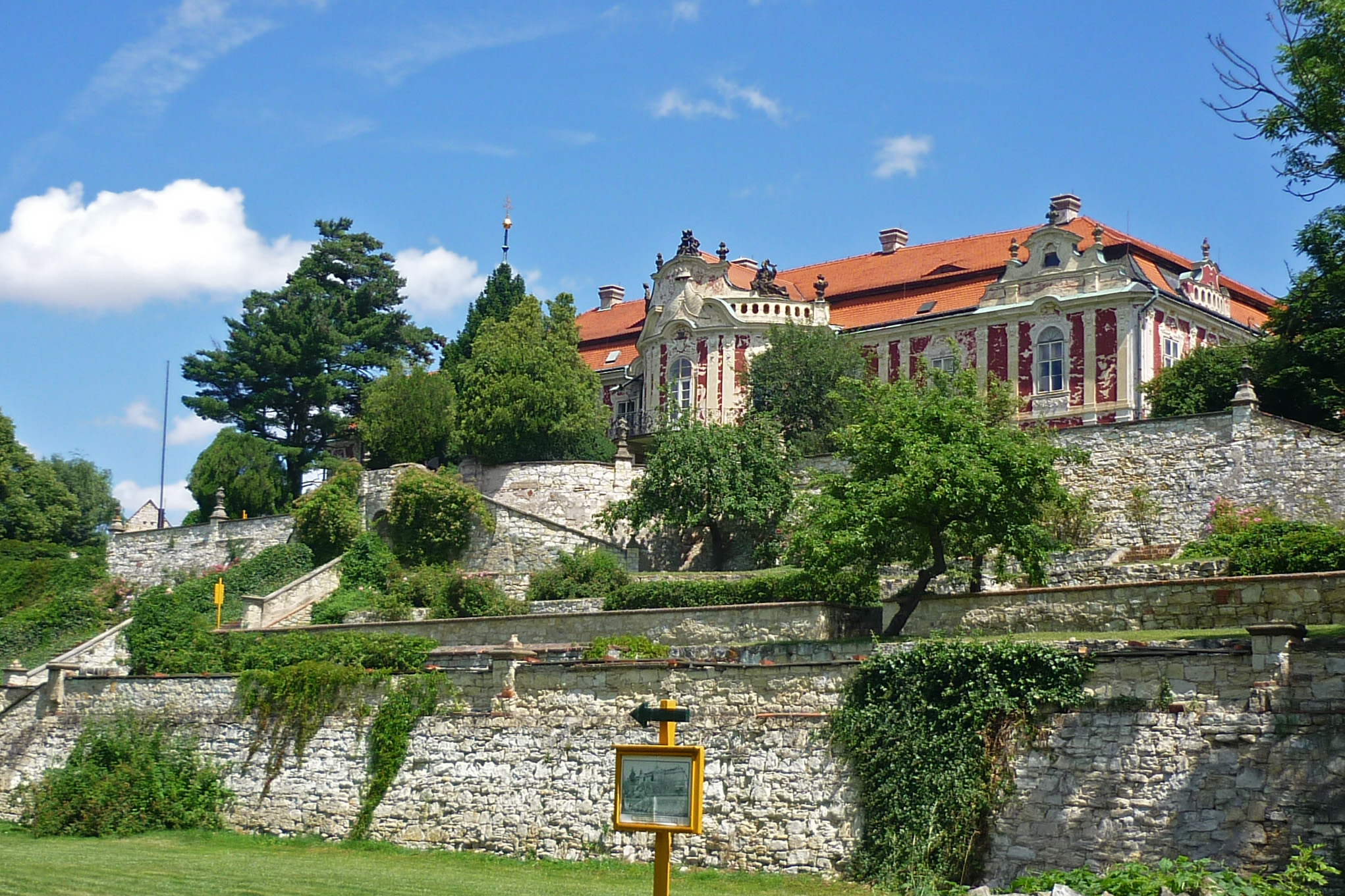
- Stekník Castle

- Location in the Czech Republic
- Coordinates: 50°19′17″N 13°36′15″E
- Country: Czech Republic
- Region: Ústí nad Labem
- District: Louny
- First mentioned: 1517

Area
  - Total: 6.07 km^{2} (2.34 sq mi)
- Elevation: 192 m (630 ft)

Population (2026-01-01)
  - Total: 102
  - Density: 16.8/km^{2} (43.5/sq mi)
- Time zone: UTC+1 (CET)
  - Summer (DST): UTC+2 (CEST)
- Postal code: 438 01
- Website: www.zaluzice.cz

UNESCO World Heritage Site
- Criteria: iii, iv, v
- Reference: 1558
- Inscription: 2023 (45th Session)

Zálužice is a municipality and village in Louny District in the Ústí nad Labem Region of the Czech Republic. It has about 100 inhabitants. The village of Stekník within the municipality is well preserved and is protected as a village monument zone. The area of Stekník is part of the UNESCO World Heritage Site called Žatec and the Landscape of Saaz Hops.

== Administrative division ==
Zálužice consists of three municipal parts (in brackets population according to the 2021 census):

- Zálužice (37)
- Rybňany (28)
- Stekník (31)

== Etymology ==
The name Zálužice is a diminutive of the Czech word záluží. Záluží (za = 'behind'; luh = 'flodplain', 'wet meadow') means "area behind the floodplain".

== Geography ==
Zálužice is located about 4 kilometres (2 mi) east of Žatec, 14 kilometres (9 mi) west of Louny and 48 km (30 mi) southwest of Ústí nad Labem. It lies in an agricultural landscape in the Most Basin. The highest point is at 242 m (794 ft) above sea level. The Ohře River flows through the municipality. The confluence of the Ohře and Blšanka rivers is located in the municipal territory.

== History ==
The first written mention of Zálužice is from 1517, when the town of Žatec bought half of the village from the Lobkowicz family. Stekník was first mentioned in 1389 and Rybňany in 1405.

== Demographics ==
Historical population

| Year | Pop. | ±% |
|---|---|---|
| 1869 | 661 | — |
| 1880 | 672 | +1.7% |
| 1890 | 630 | −6.2% |
| 1900 | 652 | +3.5% |
| 1910 | 603 | −7.5% |

| Year | Pop. | ±% |
|---|---|---|
| 1921 | 532 | −11.8% |
| 1930 | 529 | −0.6% |
| 1950 | 343 | −35.2% |
| 1961 | 256 | −25.4% |
| 1970 | 191 | −25.4% |

| Year | Pop. | ±% |
|---|---|---|
| 1980 | 134 | −29.8% |
| 1991 | 86 | −35.8% |
| 2001 | 72 | −16.3% |
| 2011 | 65 | −9.7% |
| 2021 | 96 | +47.7% |

Source: Censuses

== Economy ==
Zálužice lies in the Žatec Hop Region where Saaz hops are grown. The area of Stekník became part of the UNESCO World Heritage Site called Žatec and the Landscape of Saaz Hops in 2023.

== Transport ==
There are no railways or major roads passing through the municipality.

== Sights ==
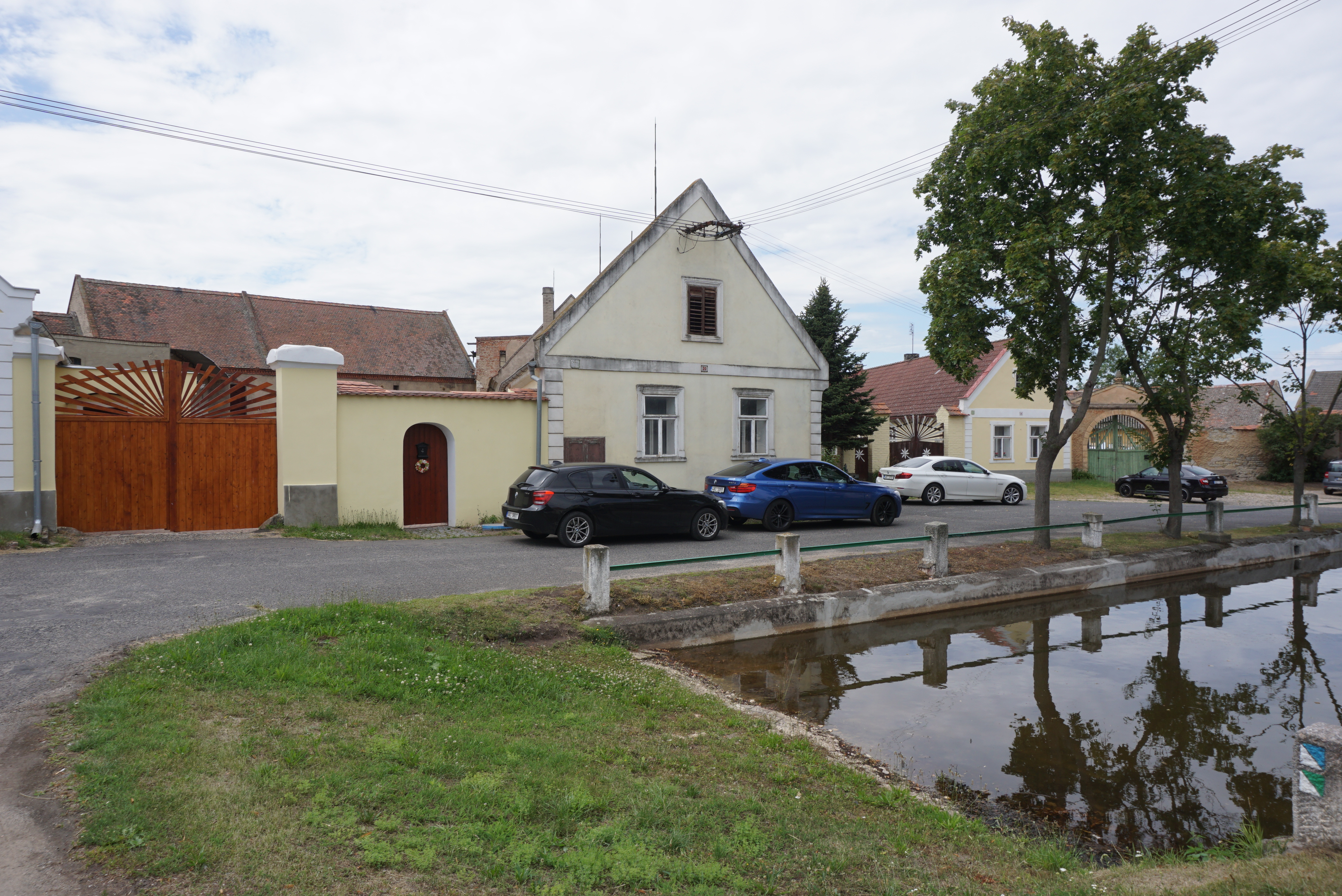
Centre of Stekník

The most important monument in the municipality is the Stekník Castle. In 1681, Jan Kulhánek (later promoted to lord of Klaudenstein) bought Stekník and had built the Baroque castle on the site of a former fortress. During the rule of his grandson Jan František between 1760 and 1772, the castle was rebuilt in the Rococo style. Today the castle is owned by the state and offers guided tours.

The village of Stekník is protected as a village monument zone for its valuable set of preserved vernacular architecture. All the historic buildings of the village show specific features that demonstrate their use for drying and processing hops.
