= Želeč (Prostějov District) =

- Municipality
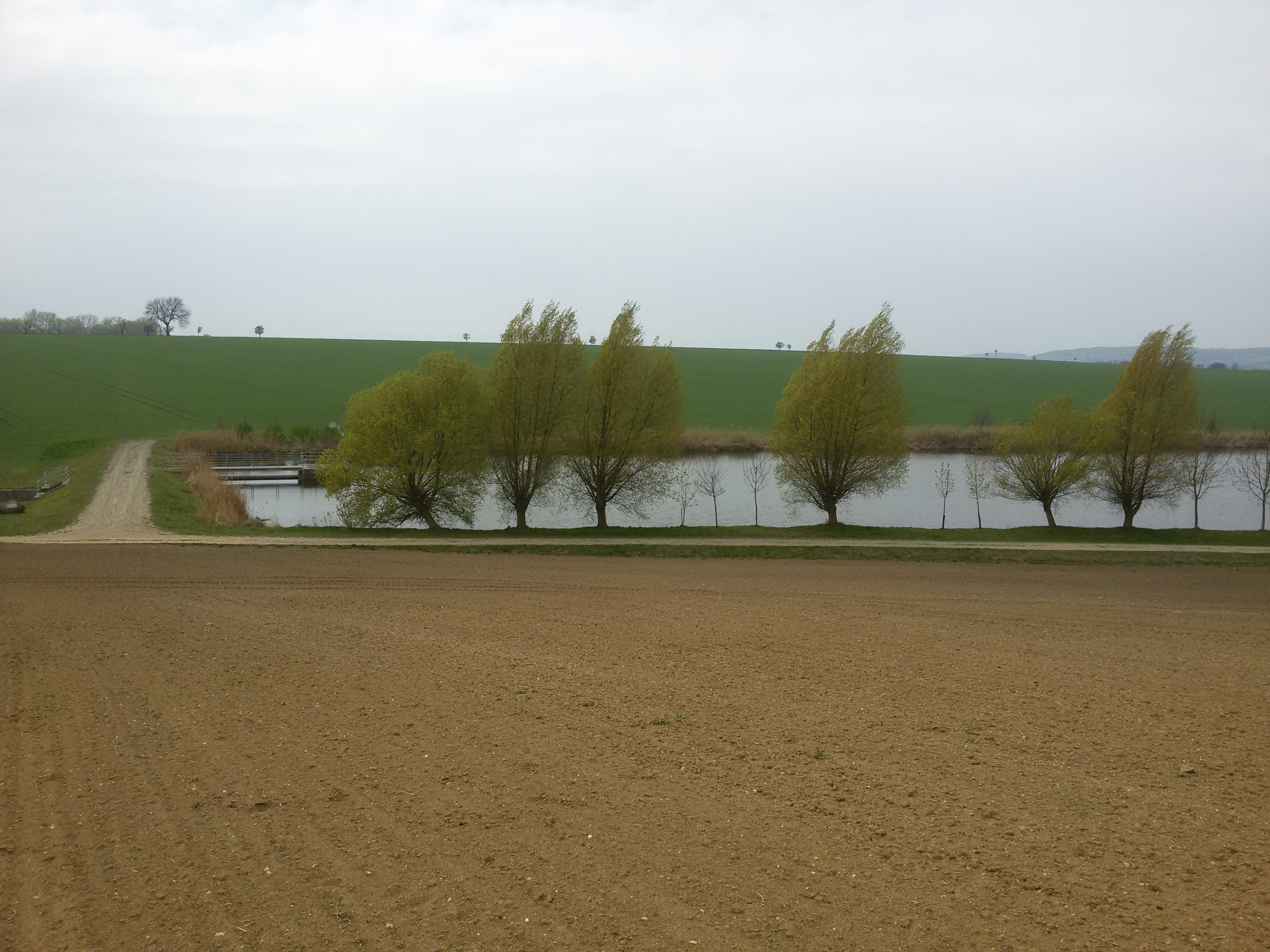
- A fishpond in Želeč

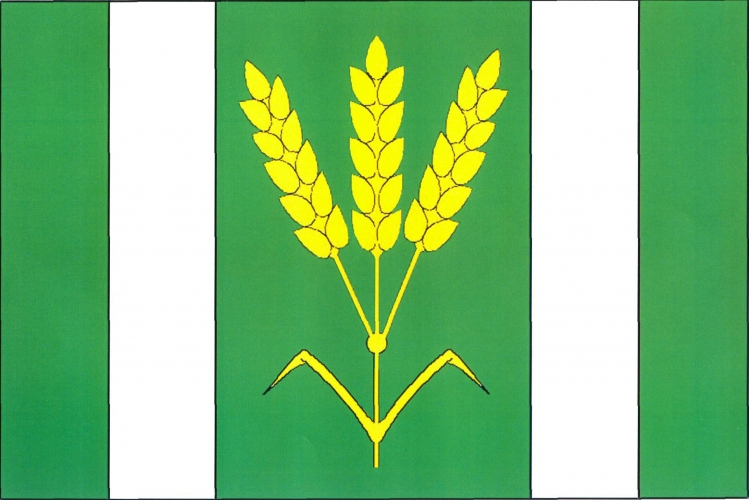
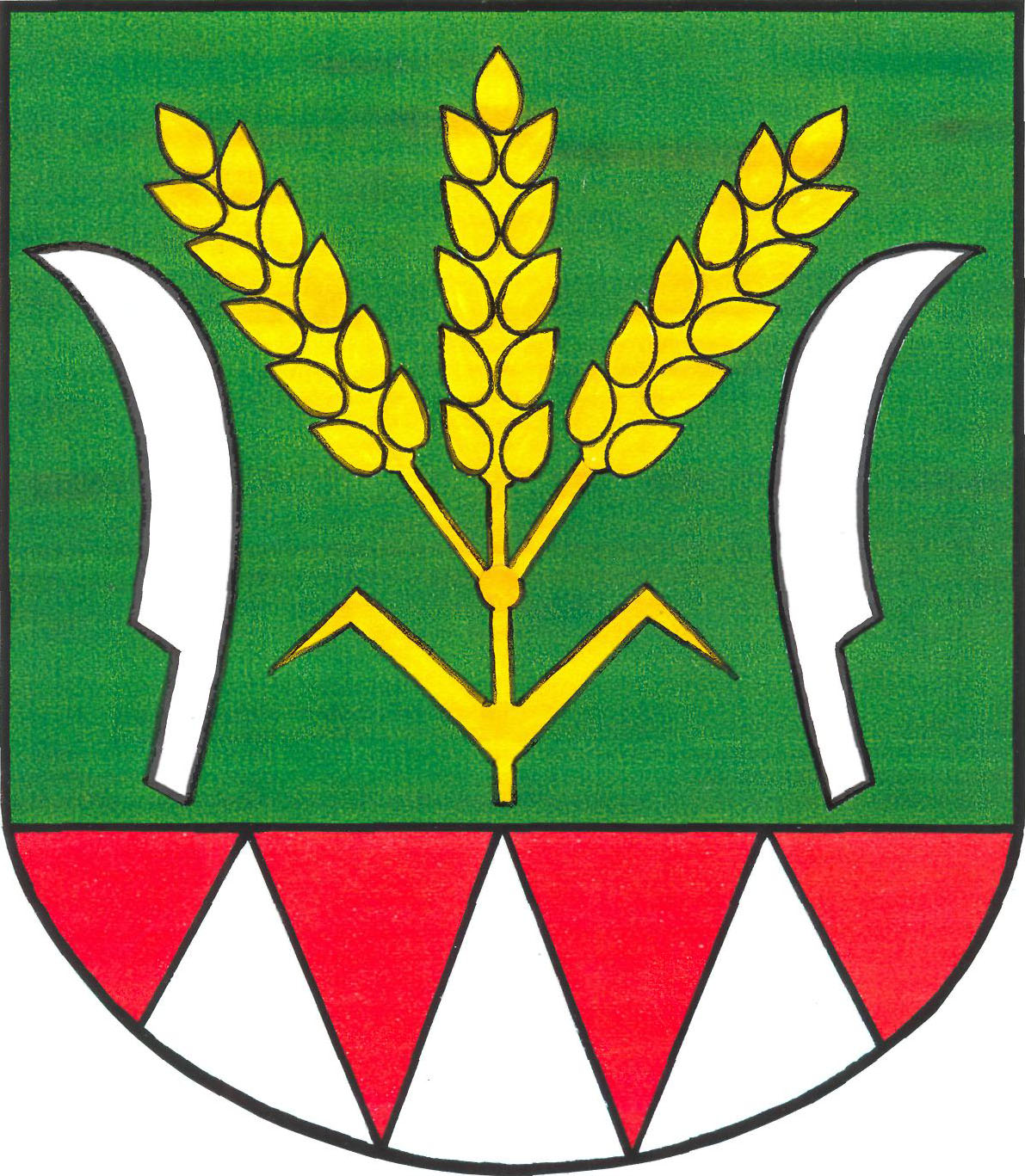
- Flag Coat of arms

- Location in the Czech Republic
- Coordinates: 49°20′46″N 17°5′52″E
- Country: Czech Republic
- Region: Olomouc
- District: Prostějov
- First mentioned: 1141

Area
  - Total: 8.09 km^{2} (3.12 sq mi)
- Elevation: 241 m (791 ft)

Population (2026-01-01)
  - Total: 576
  - Density: 71.2/km^{2} (184/sq mi)
- Time zone: UTC+1 (CET)
  - Summer (DST): UTC+2 (CEST)
- Postal code: 798 07
- Website: www.zelec.cz

Želeč is a municipality and village in Prostějov District in the Olomouc Region of the Czech Republic. It has about 600 inhabitants.

Želeč lies approximately 14 kilometres (9 mi) south of Prostějov, 30 km (19 mi) south of Olomouc, and 210 km (130 mi) south-east of Prague.

== Demographics ==
Historical population
Year	Pop.	±%
1869	748	—
1880	818	+9.4%
1890	785	−4.0%
1900	821	+4.6%
1910	964	+17.4%
1921	915	−5.1%
1930	849	−7.2%
1950	785	−7.5%
1961	802	+2.2%
1970	715	−10.8%
1980	671	−6.2%
1991	578	−13.9%
2001	558	−3.5%
2011	522	−6.5%
2021	551	+5.6%
Source: Censuses
