= Měcholupy (Louny District) =

- Market town
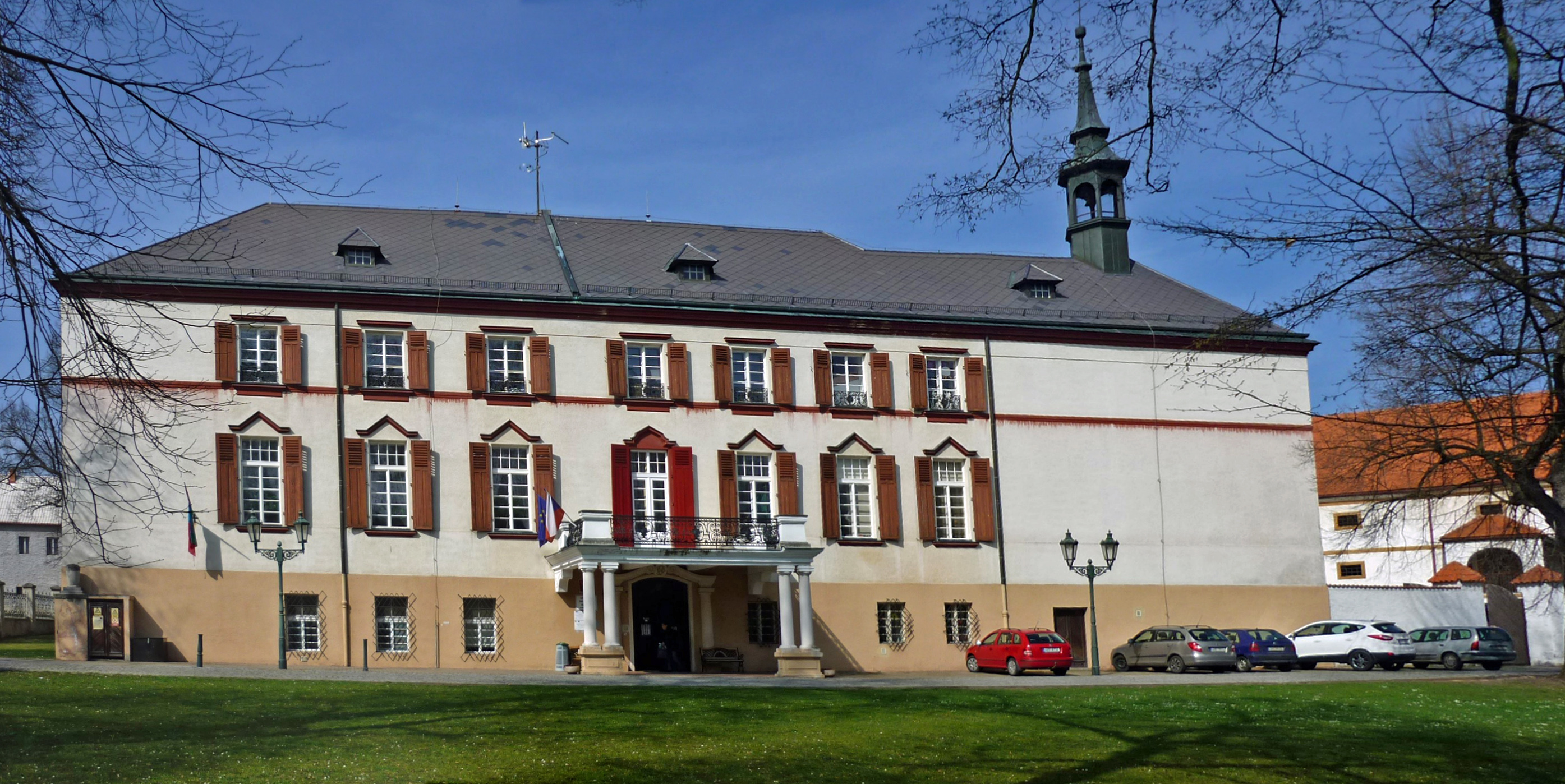
- Měcholupy Castle

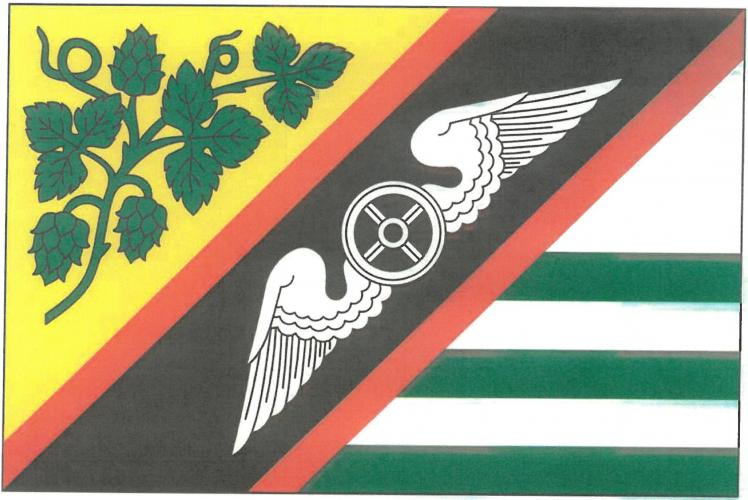
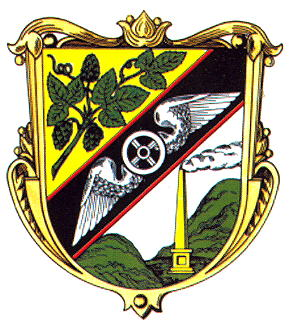
- Flag Coat of arms

- Location in the Czech Republic
- Coordinates: 50°16′0″N 13°32′15″E
- Country: Czech Republic
- Region: Ústí nad Labem
- District: Louny
- First mentioned: 1295

Area
  - Total: 29.17 km^{2} (11.26 sq mi)
- Elevation: 253 m (830 ft)

Population (2026-01-01)
  - Total: 962
  - Density: 33.0/km^{2} (85.4/sq mi)
- Time zone: UTC+1 (CET)
  - Summer (DST): UTC+2 (CEST)
- Postal code: 439 31
- Website: www.mecholupy-sc.cz

Měcholupy (Czech pronunciation: [ˈmɲɛxolupɪ]; German: Michelob) is a market town in Louny District in the Ústí nad Labem Region of the Czech Republic. It has about 1,000 inhabitants.

== Administrative division ==
Měcholupy consists of four municipal parts (in brackets population according to the 2021 census):

- Měcholupy (442)
- Milošice (43)
- Velká Černoc (237)
- Želeč (208)

== Etymology ==
The Old Czech word měcholup was derived from měch ('money bag') and lupič ('robber'), and referred to a type of robbers. Měcholupy was initially a settlement of such robbers.

== Geography ==
Měcholupy is located about 21 kilometres (13 mi) southwest of Louny, 55 km (34 mi) southwest of Ústí nad Labem and 60 km (37 mi) northwest of Prague. The northern part of the municipal territory lies in the Most Basin. The southern part lies in the Rakovník Uplands and includes the highest point of Měcholupy at 433 m (1,421 ft) above sea level. The market town is situated on the Blšanka River.

== History ==
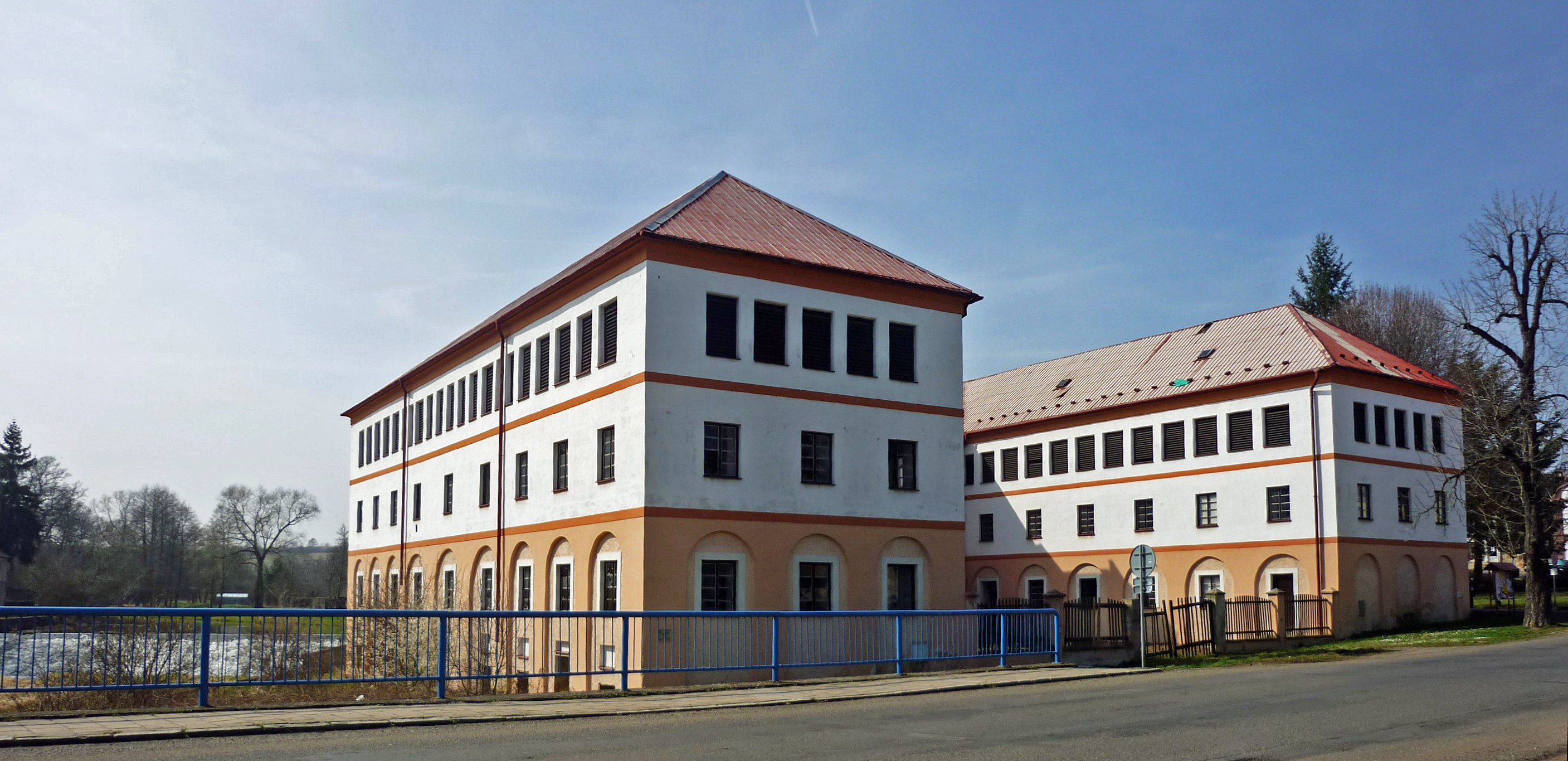
Building of the former brewery

The first written mention of Měcholupy is from 1295. Among the owners of the village were King Vladislaus II, the Sekera od Sedčice family, and members of the dynasties of Kolowrat and Lobkowicz. At the end of the 17th century, during the rule of Karl of Paar, the local fortress was rebuilt into a Baroque castle with a chapel.

In 1860, brewer Anton Dreher bought the Měcholupy estate, established a new brewery, and had the castle rebuilt into its current appearance. The village was promoted to a market town in 1875. The Michelob beer brand of Anheuser-Busch was introduced in 1896 and was named after the German name of Měcholupy.

== Demographics ==
Historical population

Year	Pop.	±%
1869	2,216	—
1880	2,406	+8.6%
1890	2,412	+0.2%
1900	2,600	+7.8%
1910	2,627	+1.0%

Year	Pop.	±%
1921	2,404	−8.5%
1930	2,509	+4.4%
1950	1,243	−50.5%
1961	1,283	+3.2%
1970	1,178	−8.2%

Year	Pop.	±%
1980	1,141	−3.1%
1991	945	−17.2%
2001	1,045	+10.6%
2011	918	−12.2%
2021	930	+1.3%

Source: Censuses

== Economy ==
Měcholupy is located in an area known for growing the Saaz hops.

== Transport ==
Měcholupy lies on a railway line heading from Jirkov and Chomutov to Lužná. There are two stations and stops: Měcholupy and Želeč.

== Sights ==
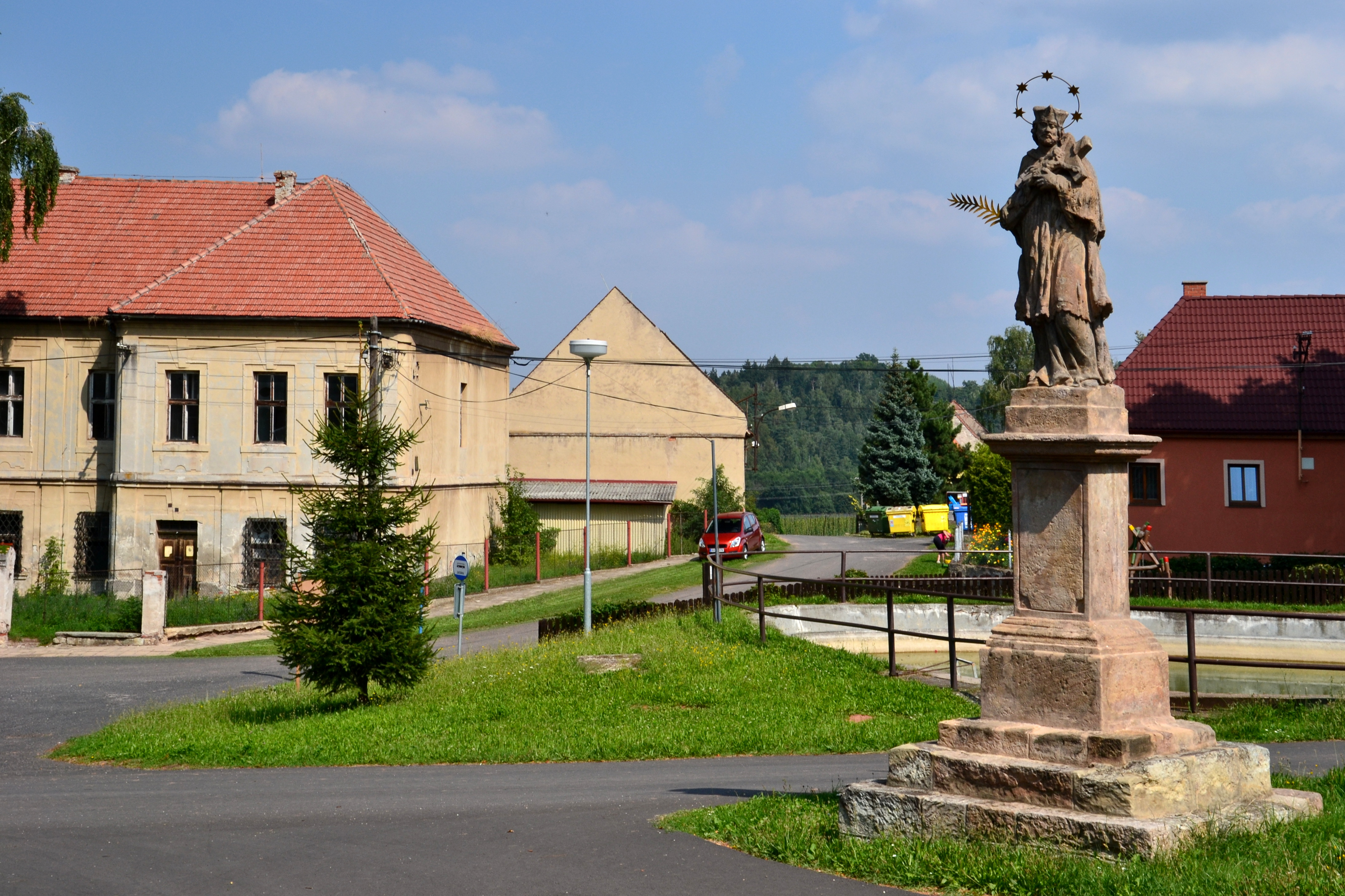
Centre of Želeč with the castle

Today the Měcholupy Castle serves as a special school.

In the centre of Želeč are a late Baroque castle and the Church of Saint Nicholas. It is a Baroque church from 1750. The tower was added in 1842.

The Church of Saint Wenceslaus in Velká Černoc was built in the Baroque style in 1783–1787.
