= Libořice =

- Municipality
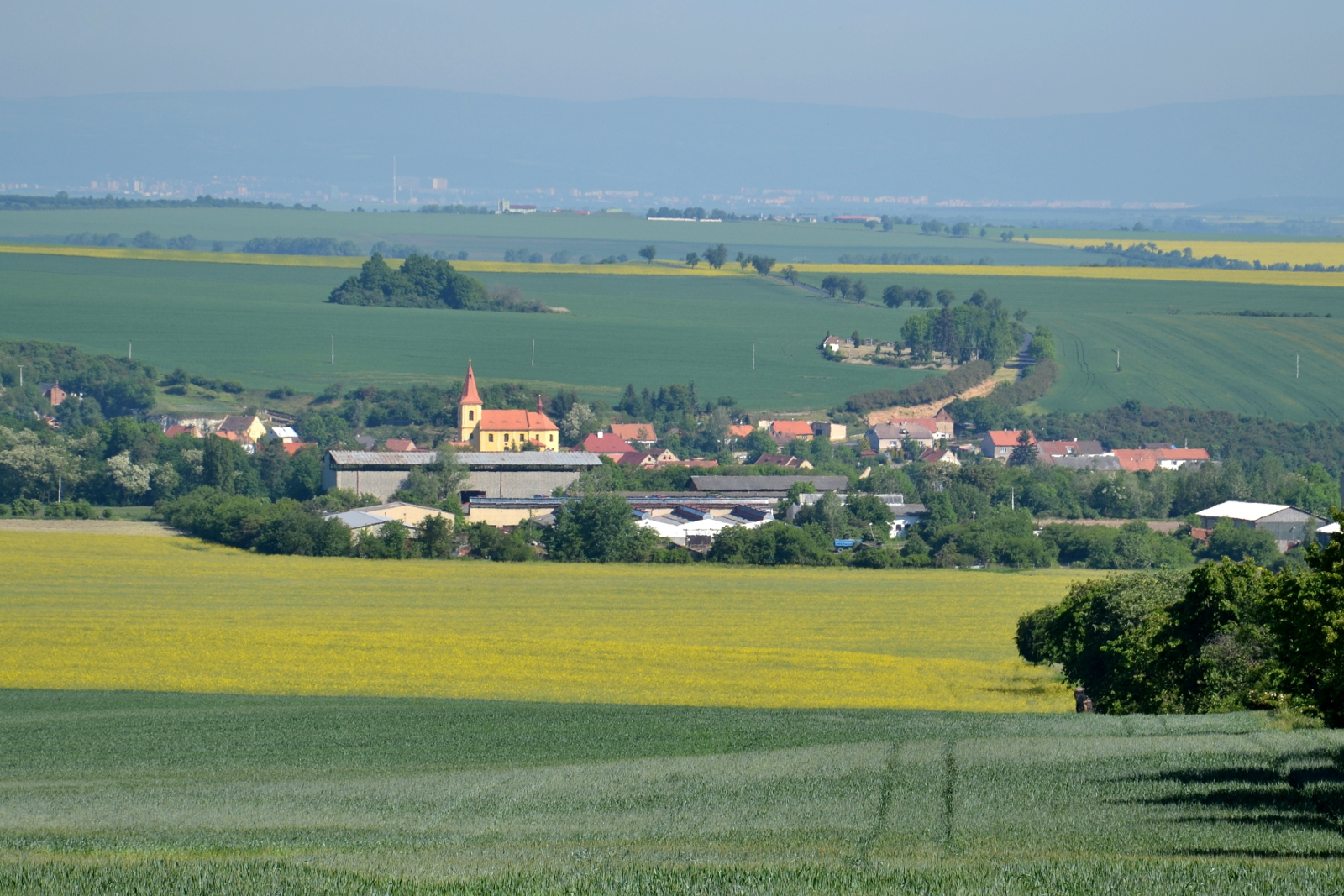
- View from the south

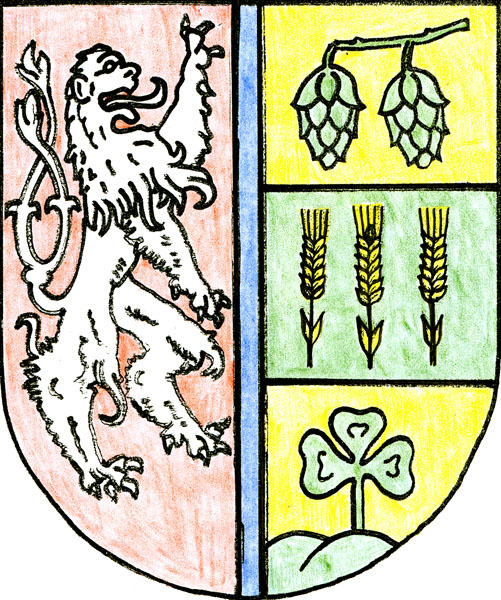
- Flag Coat of arms

- Location in the Czech Republic
- Coordinates: 50°15′17″N 13°30′55″E
- Country: Czech Republic
- Region: Ústí nad Labem
- District: Louny
- First mentioned: 1333

Area
  - Total: 10.33 km^{2} (3.99 sq mi)
- Elevation: 259 m (850 ft)

Population (2026-01-01)
  - Total: 375
  - Density: 36.3/km^{2} (94.0/sq mi)
- Time zone: UTC+1 (CET)
  - Summer (DST): UTC+2 (CEST)
- Postal code: 438 01
- Website: www.liborice.cz

Libořice (German: Liboritz) is a municipality and village in Louny District in the Ústí nad Labem Region of the Czech Republic. It has about 400 inhabitants.

Libořice lies approximately 24 kilometres (15 mi) south-west of Louny, 60 km (37 mi) south-west of Ústí nad Labem, and 67 km (42 mi) west of Prague.

== Administrative division ==
Libořice consists of two municipal parts (in brackets population according to the 2021 census):

- Libořice (266)
- Železná (64)

== Demographics ==
Historical population
Year	Pop.	±%
1869	1,224	—
1880	1,035	−15.4%
1890	1,027	−0.8%
1900	1,190	+15.9%
1910	1,201	+0.9%
1921	1,140	−5.1%
1930	1,077	−5.5%
1950	579	−46.2%
1961	496	−14.3%
1970	389	−21.6%
1980	376	−3.3%
1991	372	−1.1%
2001	357	−4.0%
2011	315	−11.8%
2021	330	+4.8%
Source: Censuses
