= Očihov =

- Municipality
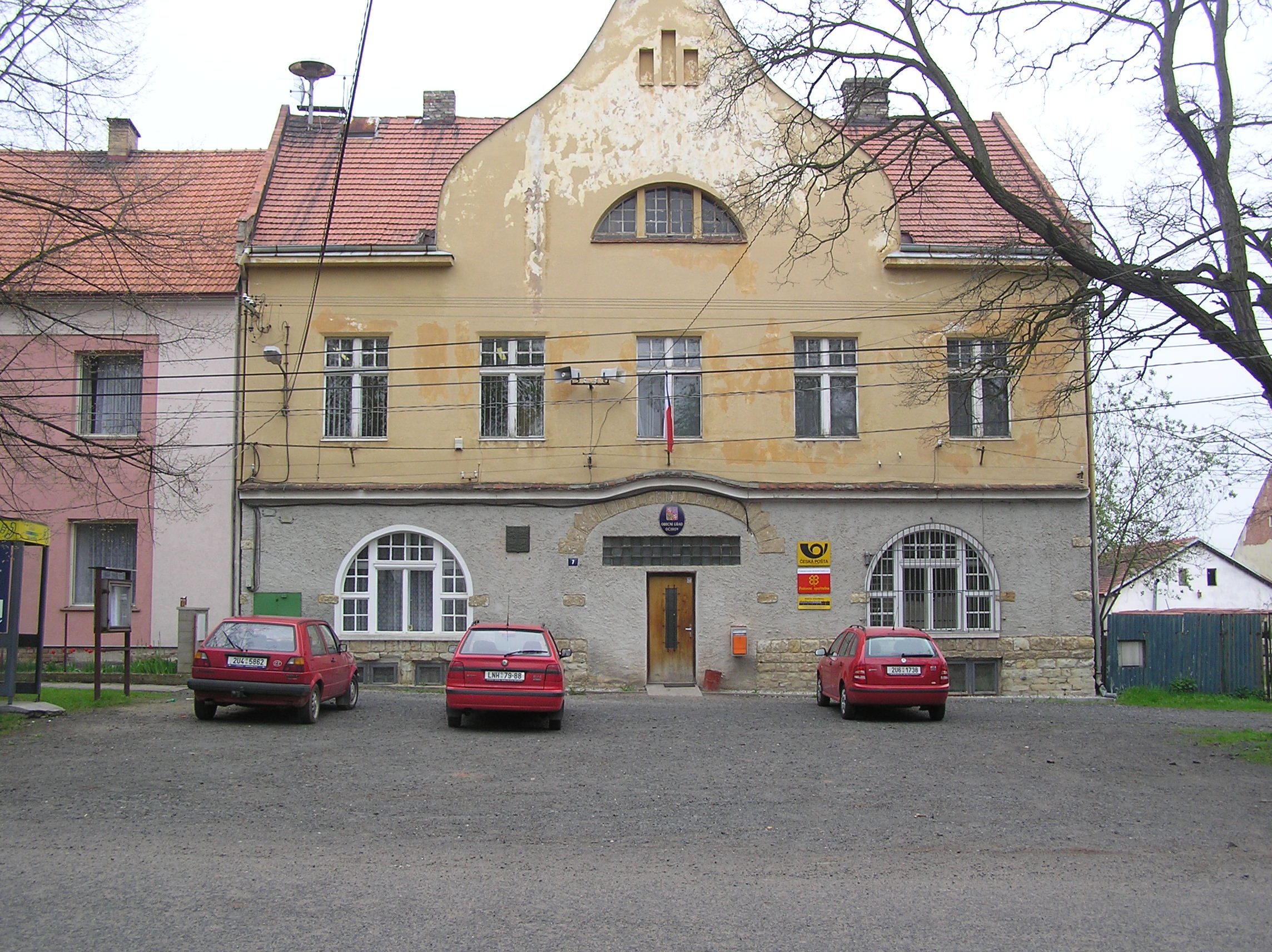
- Municipal office

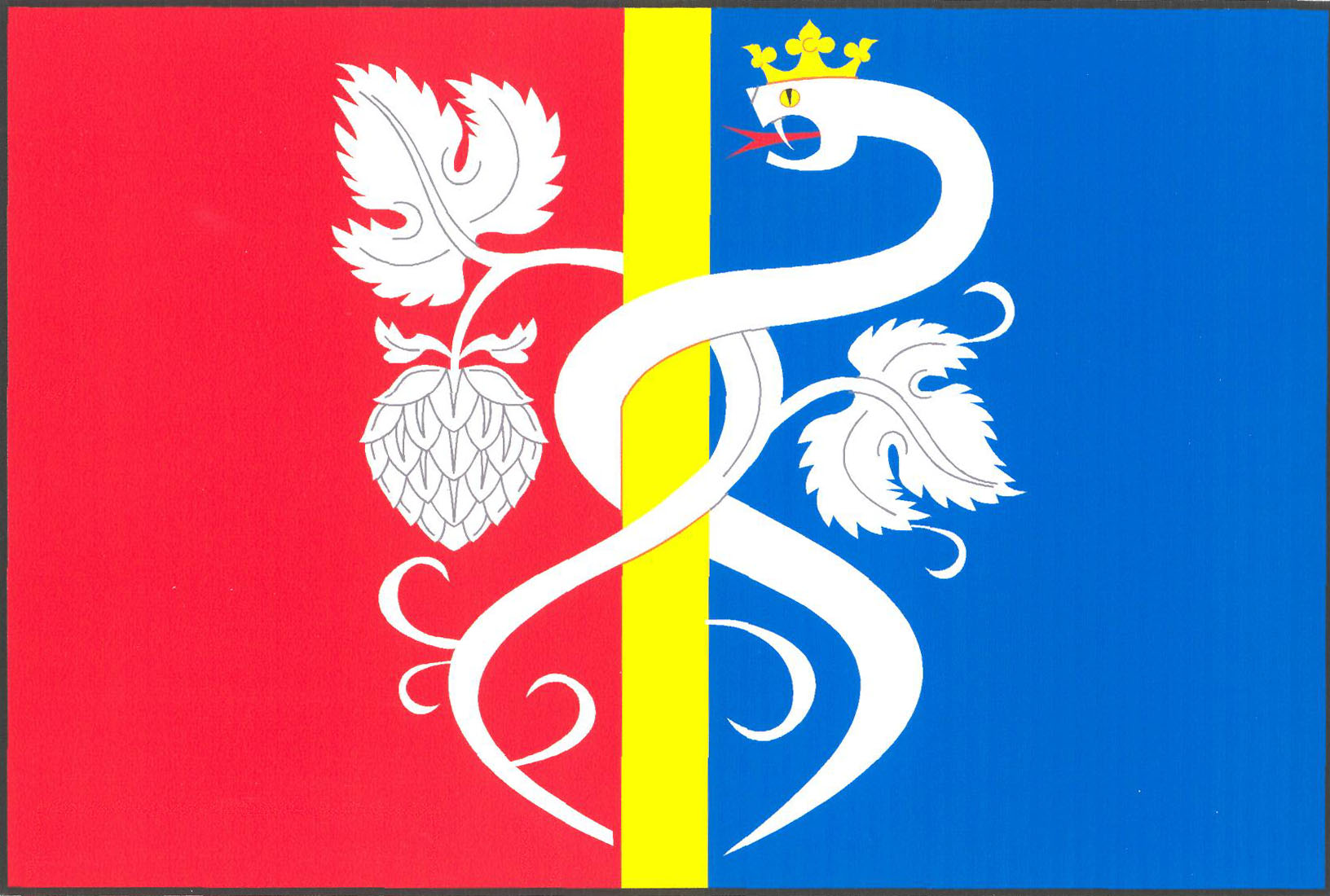
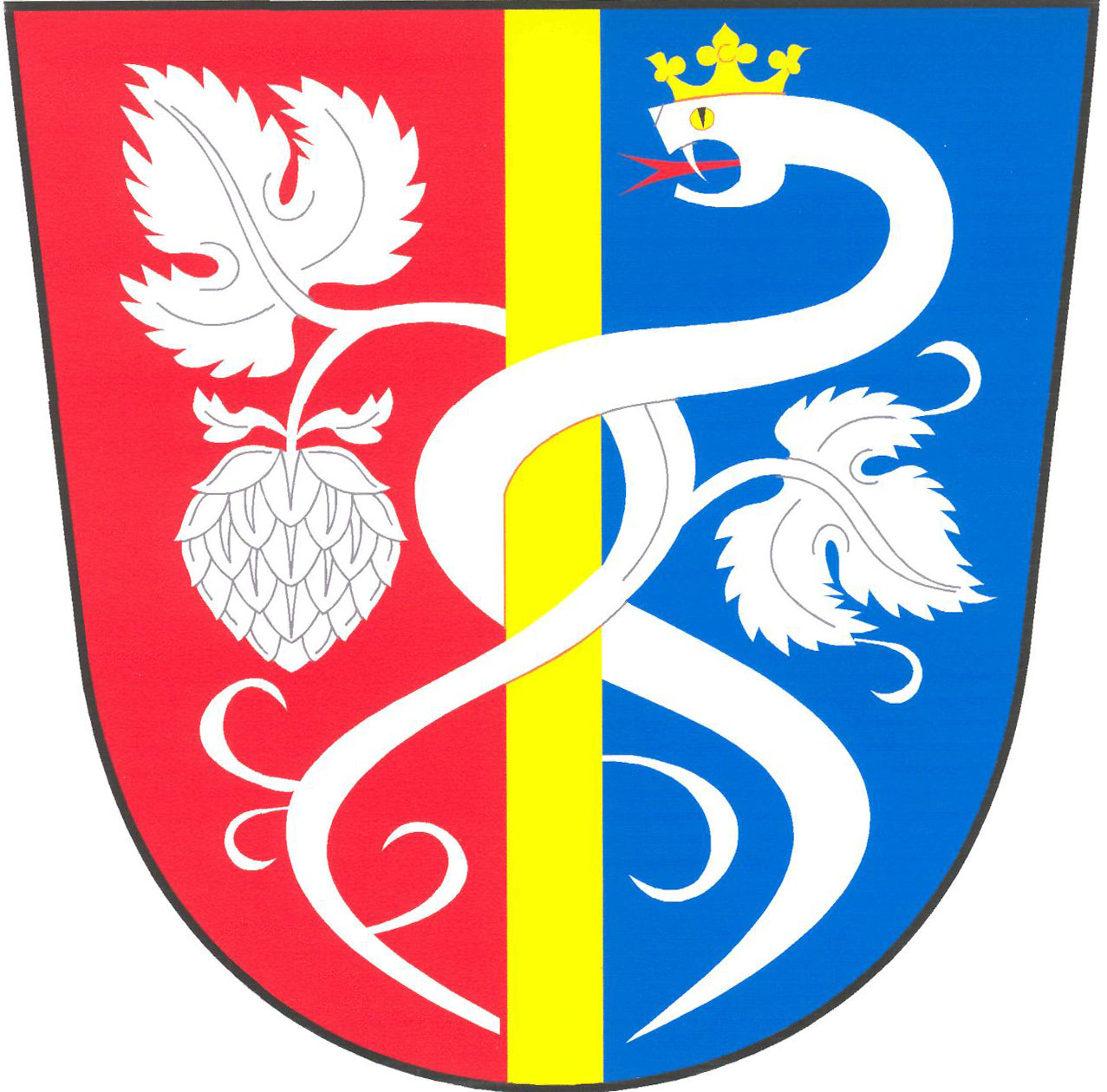
- Flag Coat of arms

- Location in the Czech Republic
- Coordinates: 50°11′55″N 13°27′38″E
- Country: Czech Republic
- Region: Ústí nad Labem
- District: Louny
- First mentioned: 1289

Area
  - Total: 12.45 km^{2} (4.81 sq mi)
- Elevation: 289 m (948 ft)

Population (2026-01-01)
  - Total: 357
  - Density: 28.7/km^{2} (74.3/sq mi)
- Time zone: UTC+1 (CET)
  - Summer (DST): UTC+2 (CEST)
- Postal code: 439 87
- Website: www.ocihov.cz

Očihov is a municipality and village in Louny District in the Ústí nad Labem Region of the Czech Republic. It has about 400 inhabitants.

Očihov lies approximately 31 kilometres (19 mi) south-west of Louny, 67 km (42 mi) south-west of Ústí nad Labem, and 71 km (44 mi) west of Prague.

== Administrative division ==
Očihov consists of two municipal parts (in brackets population according to the 2021 census):

- Očihov (307)
- Očihovec (53)

== Demographics ==
Historical population
Year	Pop.	±%
1869	796	—
1880	881	+10.7%
1890	877	−0.5%
1900	915	+4.3%
1910	884	−3.4%
1921	866	−2.0%
1930	832	−3.9%
1950	347	−58.3%
1961	455	+31.1%
1970	431	−5.3%
1980	355	−17.6%
1991	308	−13.2%
2001	297	−3.6%
2011	338	+13.8%
2021	360	+6.5%
Source: Censuses
