= Valeč (Třebíč District) =

- Municipality
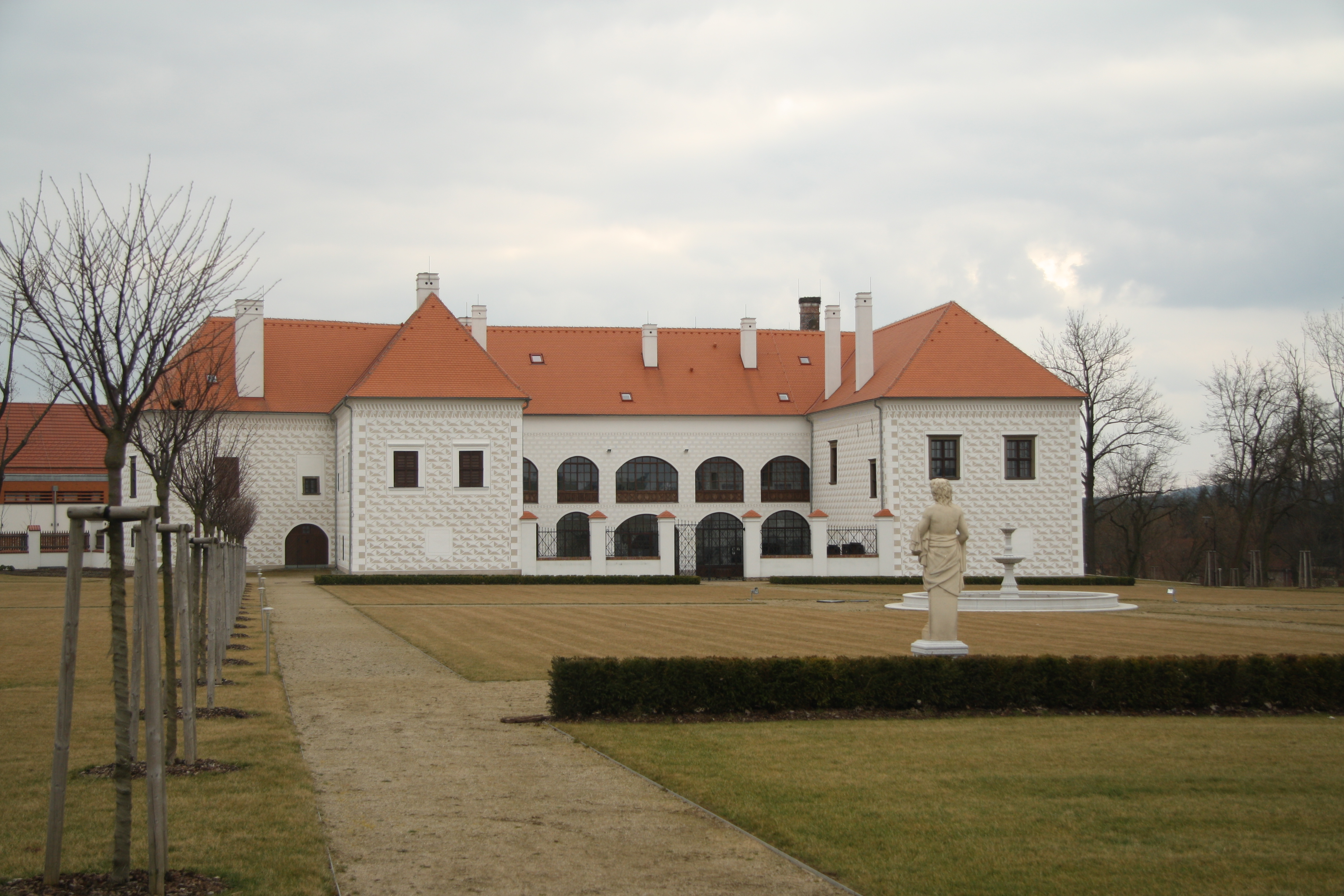
- Valeč Castle

- Flag Coat of arms

- Location in the Czech Republic
- Coordinates: 49°8′40″N 16°2′9″E
- Country: Czech Republic
- Region: Vysočina
- District: Třebíč
- First mentioned: 1294

Area
  - Total: 10.70 km^{2} (4.13 sq mi)
- Elevation: 438 m (1,437 ft)

Population (2026-01-01)
  - Total: 873
  - Density: 81.6/km^{2} (211/sq mi)
- Time zone: UTC+1 (CET)
  - Summer (DST): UTC+2 (CEST)
- Postal code: 675 53
- Website: www.obecvalec.cz

Valeč is a municipality and village in Třebíč District in the Vysočina Region of the Czech Republic. It has about 900 inhabitants.

Valeč lies approximately 14 kilometres (9 mi) south-east of Třebíč, 43 km (27 mi) south-east of Jihlava, and 157 km (98 mi) south-east of Prague.

== Demographics ==
Historical population
Year	Pop.	±%
1869	657	—
1880	711	+8.2%
1890	744	+4.6%
1900	740	−0.5%
1910	744	+0.5%
1921	821	+10.3%
1930	760	−7.4%
1950	624	−17.9%
1961	632	+1.3%
1970	637	+0.8%
1980	655	+2.8%
1991	583	−11.0%
2001	545	−6.5%
2011	689	+26.4%
2021	816	+18.4%
Source: Censuses
