= Grace Adele Freebey =

American musician (1885–1943)

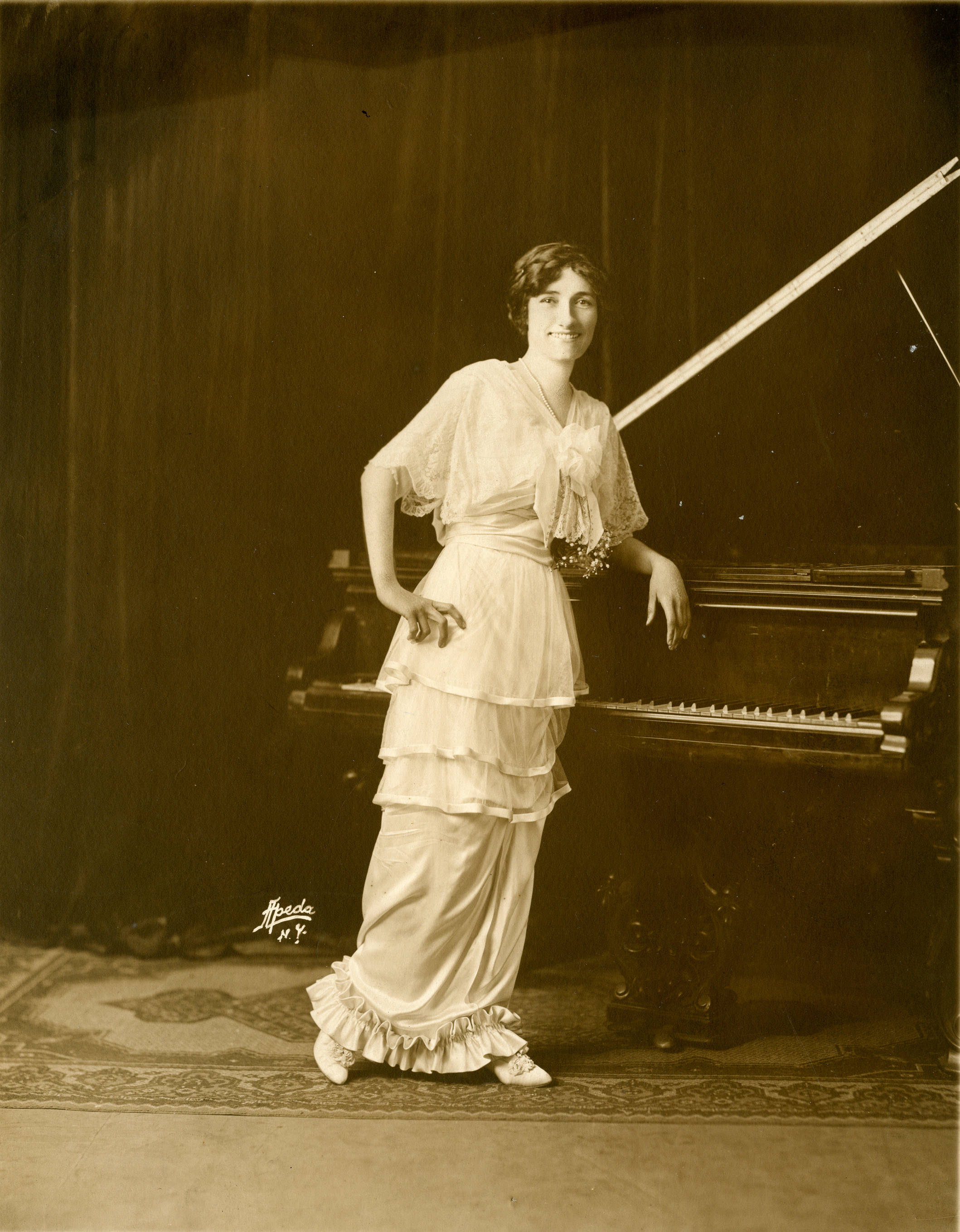
- Grace Adele Freebey, photographed in 1914
- Born: January 25, 1885; Cuyahoga Falls, Ohio, US
- Died: March 30, 1943 (aged 58); Los Angeles, California, US
- Occupations: Musician, pianist, composer

Grace Adele Freebey (January 25, 1885 – March 30, 1943) was an American pianist, music teacher and composer.

== Early life and education ==
Freebey was born on January 25 1885, in Cuyahoga Falls, Ohio, to Charles Peter Freebey and Joanna Estelle Walsh Freebey. Her mother was born in Canada. In childhood, she moved to Los Angeles with her parents and siblings. She studied piano with A. J. Stamm, Marie von Unschuld, Louis Bachner, and Ernest Hutcheson, and composition with conductor Henry Schoenefeld.

== Career ==
Freebey performed as a concert pianist, and was accompanist for singers Ernestine Schumann-Heink and Ellen Beach Yaw, and cellists May Mukle and Alfred Wallenstein. In 1914, she toured in vaudeville with Wallenstein, a child prodigy. She was a member of the Schliewen Trio, with Wallenstein and violinist Richard Schliewen. She was business manager and accompanist of the all-woman Sunny Southland Trio.

Freebey taught piano classes at her own studio in Los Angeles, and at the Wilson-Greene School of Music, and as head of the piano department at Martha Washington Seminary in Washington, D.C.

Tunes composed by Freebey, including "My Dearest Wish" (1911), "O Golden Sun" (1912), "North Wind", "Wind of the West", "May Day", "Calling You", "Somebody's Coming", "Love's Resignation", "Just You and My Homeland" (1919), "My Golden California" (1924) and "Think of Me Sometimes" (1929), were performed by Schumann-Heink, Tsianina Redfeather, Jeanne Jomelli,Johanna Gadski, David Bispham, Constance Balfour, the People's Orchestra of Los Angeles, and other popular singers and musical groups.

== Personal life ==
Freebey died at her home in Los Angeles, on March 30, 1943, aged 58. She was buried in the Angelus-Rosedale Cemetery.
