= Lišany (Louny District) =

- Municipality
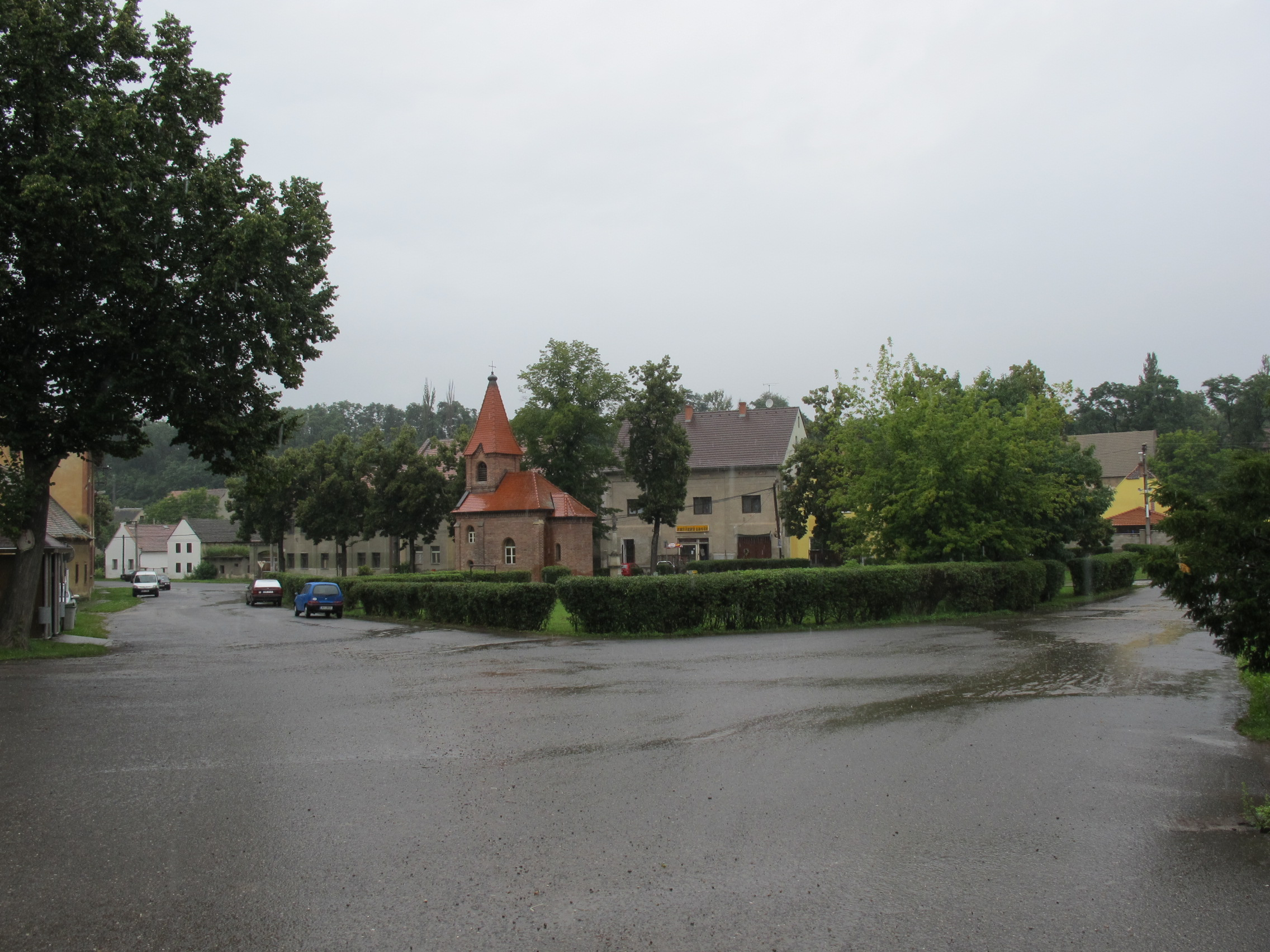
- Centre of Lišany

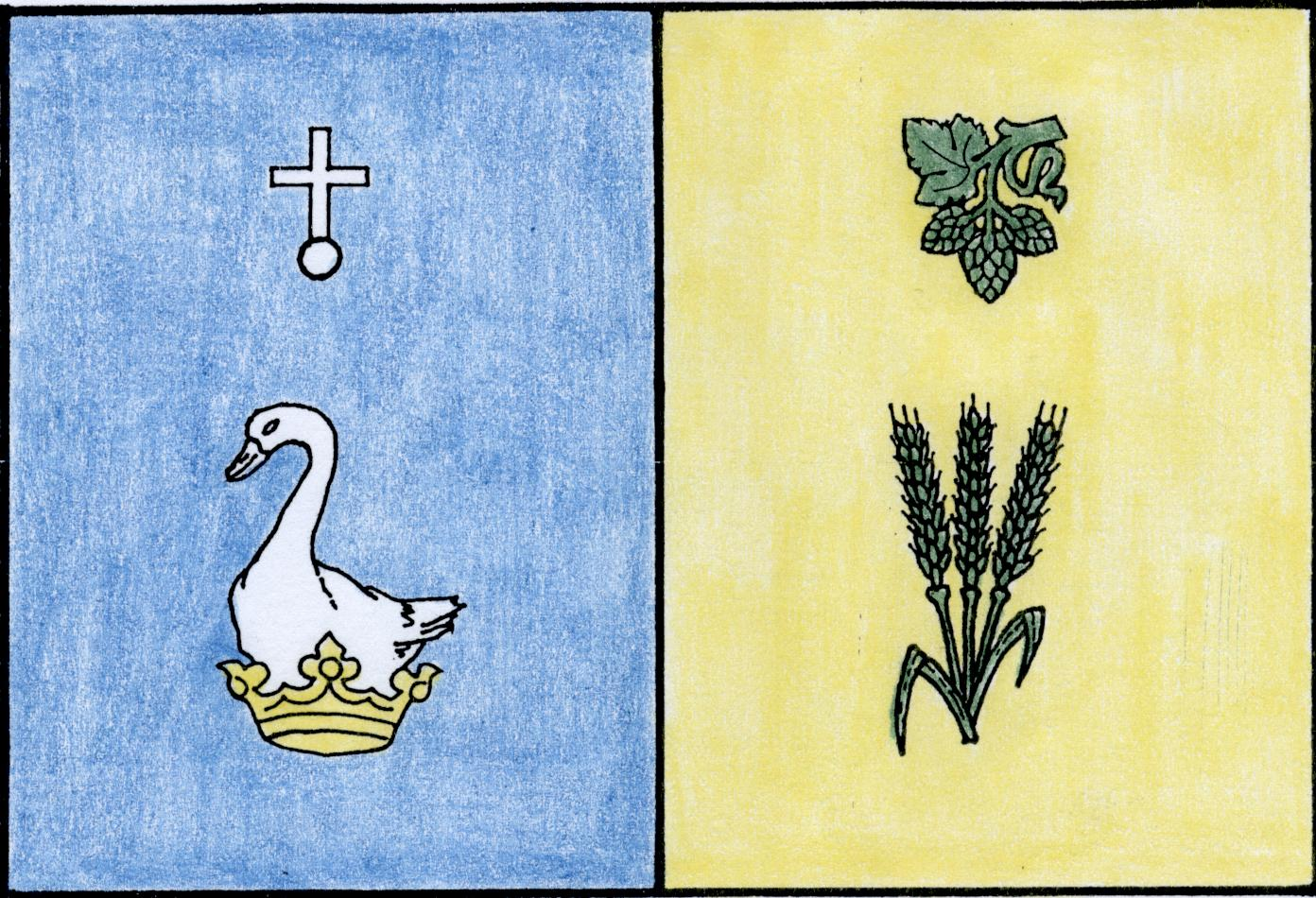
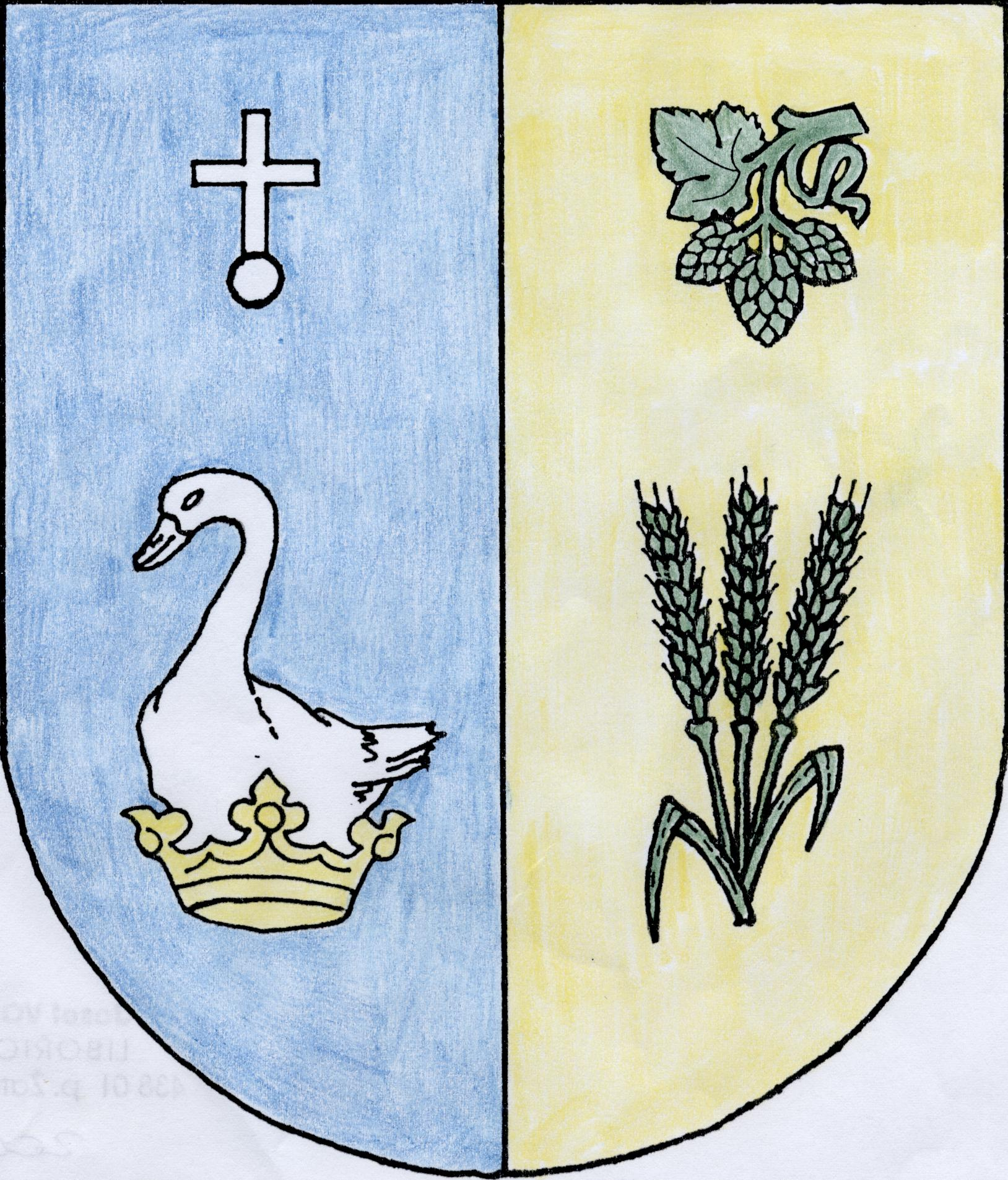
- Flag Coat of arms

- Location in the Czech Republic
- Coordinates: 50°20′40″N 13°38′31″E
- Country: Czech Republic
- Region: Ústí nad Labem
- District: Louny
- First mentioned: 1351

Area
  - Total: 5.72 km^{2} (2.21 sq mi)
- Elevation: 194 m (636 ft)

Population (2026-01-01)
  - Total: 152
  - Density: 26.6/km^{2} (68.8/sq mi)
- Time zone: UTC+1 (CET)
  - Summer (DST): UTC+2 (CEST)
- Postal code: 440 01
- Website: www.lisany.cz

Lišany (German: Lischan) is a municipality and village in Louny District in the Ústí nad Labem Region of the Czech Republic. It has about 200 inhabitants.

Lišany lies approximately 12 kilometres (7 mi) west of Louny, 45 km (28 mi) south-west of Ústí nad Labem, and 63 km (39 mi) north-west of Prague.

== Demographics ==
Historical population
Year	Pop.	±%
1869	208	—
1880	293	+40.9%
1890	299	+2.0%
1900	335	+12.0%
1910	321	−4.2%
1921	294	−8.4%
1930	353	+20.1%
1950	146	−58.6%
1961	130	−11.0%
1970	124	−4.6%
1980	146	+17.7%
1991	153	+4.8%
2001	149	−2.6%
2011	163	+9.4%
2021	149	−8.6%
Source: Censuses
