= Elyda Russell =

Australian singer

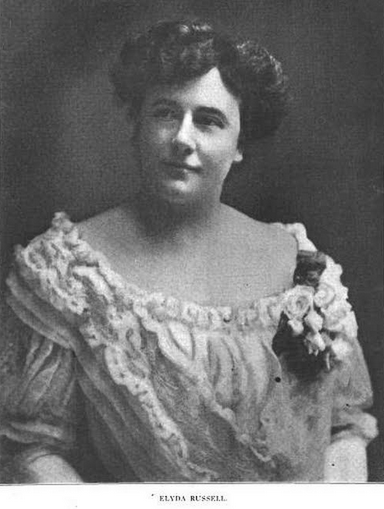
- Elyda Russell, from a 1908 publication
- Born: Eliza Alison Russell; 5 September 1872; Sydney, NSW
- Died: 17 June 1949; Perth, Western Australia
- Other names: Eliza Alison Barker (married name)
- Occupation: Singer
- Relatives: Peter Nicol Russell (uncle)

Elyda Russell Barker (5 September 1872 – 17 June 1949), born Eliza Alison Russell, was an Australian mezzo-soprano singer based in Paris and London for much of her career. She was a student of Mathilde Marchesi.

== Early life and education ==
Russell was born in Sydney, New South Wales, the daughter of George Russell and Ellen Alison Russell. Her father co-owned an engineering firm with his brother, University of Sydney benefactor Peter Nicol Russell. She played piano, and studied violin in Dresden in her youth, before training as a singer in Italy, and with Mathilde Marchesi in Paris. She was considered a "favorite pupil" of Marchesi's, and was one of the "principal mourners" at Marchesi's funeral.

== Career ==
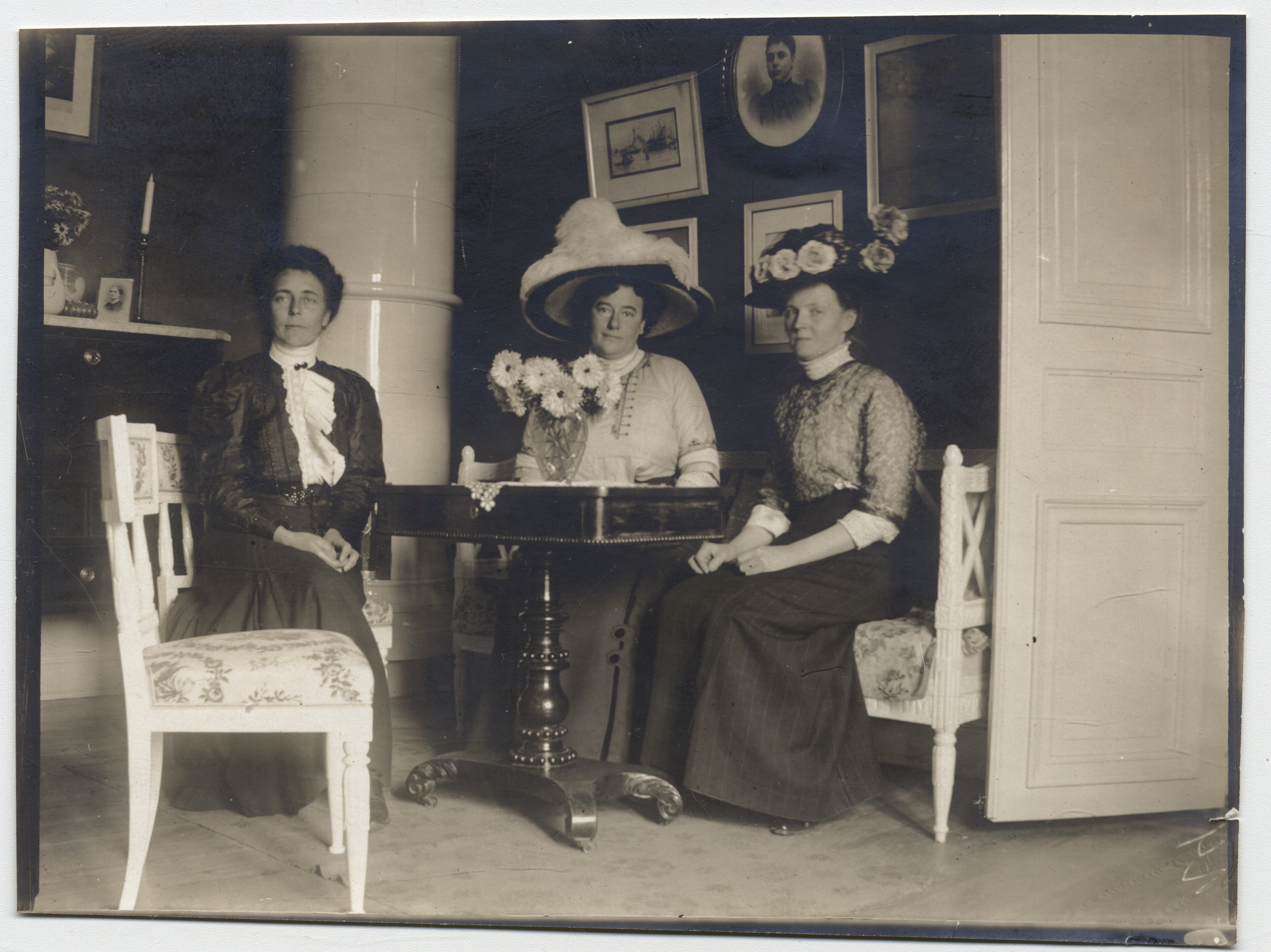
Sigrid Lowisin, Elyda Russell, and Swedish sculptor Ida Matton, in 1911

Russell sang in many European cities, and for royal audiences. She made her London debut recital at Bechstein Hall in 1903, prompting the Sydney Morning Herald to report that "It is a long time since any debutante has received such unanimously favourable notices from the London dailies." She sang again at Bechstein Hall in 1906, and she performed at The Proms in London in 1908. "Miss Russell's voice is a full mezzo soprano," noted a 1906 report, "and she sings in many languages." Mark Twain heard her sing in Paris in 1904. She toured in Scandinavia in 1908, and sang five concerts in Berlin. Her friend, Swedish sculptor Ida Matton, made a portrait bust of Russell, now in the collection of the Länsmuseet Gävleborg.

== Personal life ==
Russell traveled in Italy with Ida Matton in 1904. She married Harold E. W. Barker in 1919. She died in 1949, aged 76 years, in Perth. Her grave is in Karrakatta Cemetery.
