= Anna Pessiak-Schmerling =

Austrian composer (1834–1896)

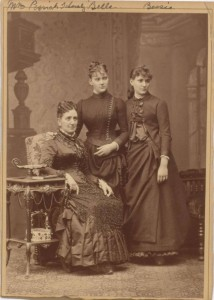
Anna Pessiak-Schmerling, soprano Belle Brown and Bessie Brown

Anna Pessiak-Schmerling (1834 – 14 March 1896) was an Austrian composer born in Vienna.

== Life and career ==
She was born Anna Schmerling, daughter of Maria Anna Giannatasio del Río (1792–1868), and the granddaughter of Cajetan Giannatasio del Río (1764–1828) who had a boarding school in Vienna. She studied with Mathilde Marchesi (1821–1913), and afterward worked as a professor of voice at the Vienna Conservatory. She composed piano work and songs, and was noted for her masses and other sacred works.

Beethoven wrote the "Hochzeitslied" [Wedding Song], WoO 105, for the wedding of Anna's mother to Leopold Schmerling in 1819. The Giannattasio del Rio family was associated with Beethoven through his nephew Karl, and Franziska (Fanny) Giannatasio del Río, Anna Pessiak-Schmerling's aunt, was a source for biographical detail on the composer. According to her, Beethoven wrote the song "Ruf vom Berge" for Anna's mother during an excursion to Himmel.
