= Constance Balfour =

American singer (1880–1965)

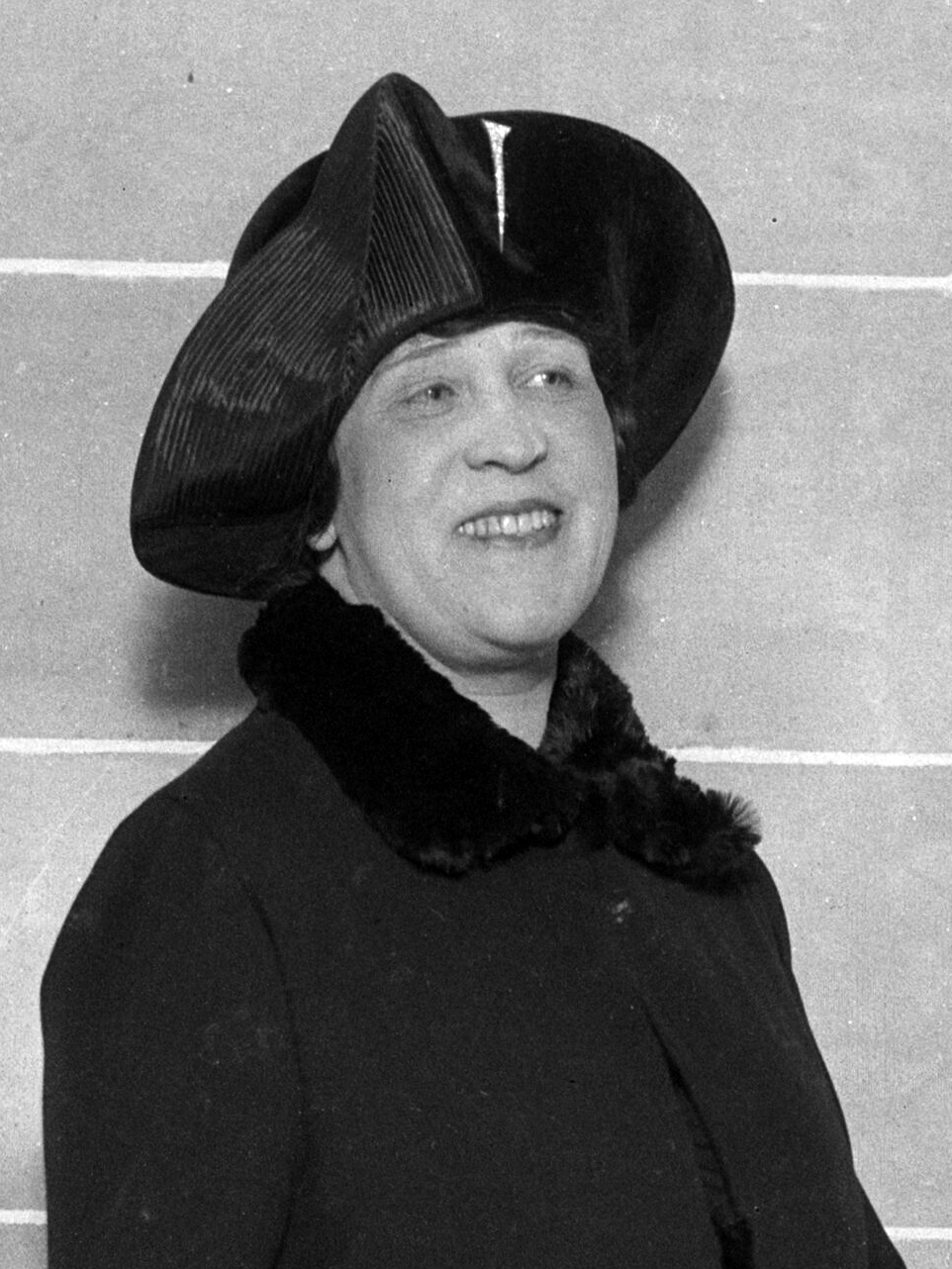
- Balfour, c. 1926
- Born: Constance Lell Loucks; 1880; Michigan, U.S.
- Died: January 28, 1965 (aged 84); San Luis Obispo, California, U.S.
- Other name: Constance Balfour Hitchen (after second marriage)
- Occupation: Singer

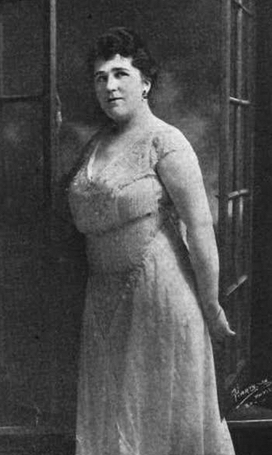
Balfour in a 1915 publication

Constance L. Balfour (born Constance Lell Loucks; 1880 – January 28, 1965) was an American soprano singer.

== Early life ==
Balfour was born Constance Lell Loucks in 1880 in Michigan. She grew up in Lincoln, Nebraska and in Houston, Texas as a young woman. She studied voice in Paris, Berlin, and London, and toured Italy, Germany, and South Africa as well, giving concerts.

== Career ==
In 1909 and 1910, Balfour headed the Constance Balfour Concert Company, a small touring group. She toured the East Coast of the United States in 1918–1919. During that time, she appeared in the summer "Stadium concerts" in New York City. During World War I she sang at a concert for sailors at Pelham Bay Naval Station, for soldiers at Fort Totten on Long Island, and at war relief concerts for Liberty Loans and the American Red Cross.

She returned to California by the end of 1919. On December 25, 1919, she sang at the first outdoor concert given by the Los Angeles Symphony Orchestra. She sang for the Santa Monica Bay Woman's Club in 1920, accompanied by composer Charles T. Ferry, and at the Easter sunrise service in Eagle Rock, Los Angeles. She sang a program of songs by Ralph Cox for the MacDowell Club in Los Angeles, with the composer accompanying her on piano. She sang songs by women composers, including Grace Adele Freebey, Helen Lukens Gant, Gertrude Ross, Josephine Johnston, and Bessie Bartlett Frankel. She also gave voice lessons, from a studio at Blanchard Hall in Los Angeles.

Balfour sang on radio in 1923. She toured Europe and studied in Italy and France from 1924 to 1927, while her teenaged daughter was there to study music and rest. In 1931 she gave a concert series in Los Angeles.

== Personal life ==
Constance Loucks was married to fellow singer Henry Balfour, also billed as Henri Le Bonti, when the couple appeared together in Los Angeles in 1907 and in 1910. They were divorced, apparently amicably, by 1915, saying "Why should we dislike each other? We sincerely admire one another as man and woman, as fellow beings and as artists". She was married to Albert Hitchen later in life. She died on January 28, 1965, aged 84 years, at her home in San Luis Obispo, California.

Her daughter Eveline Alberta Balfour (1907-1993), a pianist and singer, was in headlines as a teenager in 1924, when she went missing for a few days and was rumored to be kidnapped. She was found in an altered mental state, "victim of adolescent breakdown," according to the Los Angeles Times. Soon after, she and her mother went to Paris for a few years. She married a French man, Andre Gaudet, in 1927; she was later known as Yvonne Doray and Yvonne Barishaw.
