= Božena Kacerovská =

Czech opera singer and music educator

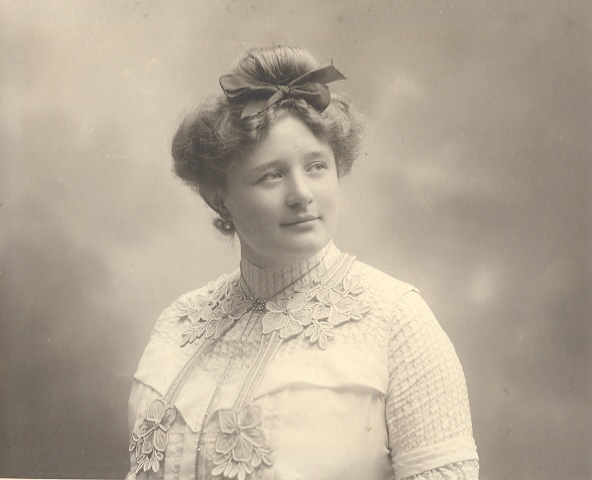
- Kacerovská in 1910

Background information
- Born: 4 August 1880; Louny, Austria-Hungary
- Died: 7 February 1970 (aged 89) Louny, Czechoslovakia
- Genre: Opera
- Occupation: Singer
- Instrument: Vocals

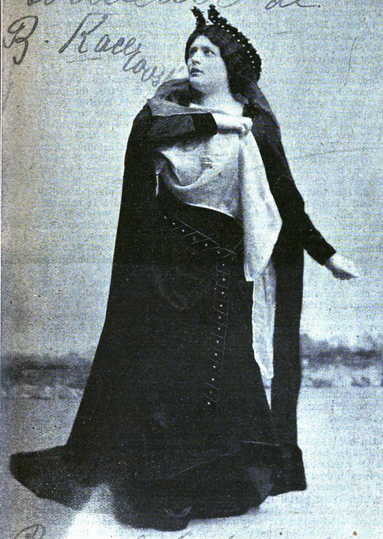
Božena Kacerovská from a 1910 publication.

Božena Kacerovská (4 August 1880 – 7 February 1970) was a Czech opera singer and music educator, based in Paris after 1906.

== Early life ==
Božena Kacerovská was born at Louny, the daughter of a barber, Jan Kacerovský, and his wife, Anne Zunkovska. She studied music in Prague under Eduard Tregler and Karel Kovařovic, and later in Paris under Mathilde Marchesi and Jean de Reszke. She also studied acting with Josef Šmaha.

== Career ==
Kacerovská played Aida with the National Theatre Opera in Prague in 1901. She also sang with the New German Opera in Prague. In 1906 she moved to Paris. She sang at the Wagner festivals in San Sebastián in 1910, 1911, and 1913, and performed with the comic opera in London, Antwerp, and Madrid. During World War I she performed in benefit concerts for the French Red Cross and other war relief causes.

In 1924 Kacerovská moved back to Prague, where she opened a singing school. In 1947 she moved back to her hometown, Louny, to live with her brother Karel. She taught singing there too, and gradually sold off her jewelry to support herself in her later days of poor health.

== Personal life ==
Kacerovská had a romantic relationship with brewer Otakar Zachar in Prague; the end of their relationship may have spurred her move to Paris. She died in Louny in 1970, aged 89 years. Her papers are in the state district archive at Louny.
