= Mathilde Marchesi =

German mezzo-soprano (1821–1913)

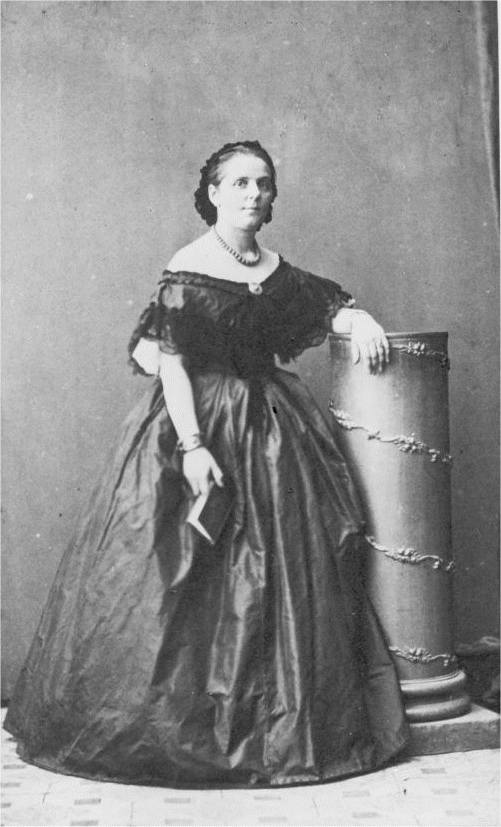
- Born: Mathilde Graumann; 24 March 1821; Frankfurt, Germany
- Died: 17 November 1913 (aged 92); London, England
- Occupations: Mezzo-soprano; teacher of singing
- Spouse: Salvatore Marchesi (m. 1852)

Signature
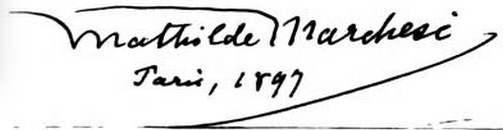

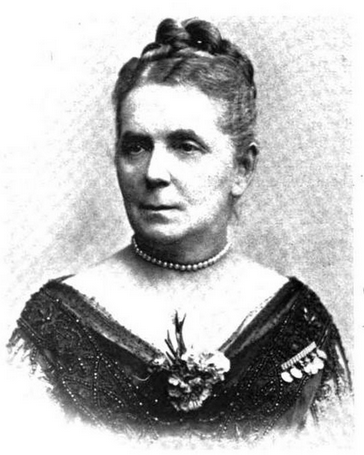
Mathilde Marchesi, from an 1897 publication

Mathilde Marchesi (née Graumann; 24 March 1821 – 17 November 1913) was a German mezzo-soprano, a singing teacher, and a proponent of the bel canto vocal method.

== Biography ==
Mathilde Graumann was born in Frankfurt. Her aunt was the pianist Dorothea von Ertmann (née Graumann). In her adolescence, her family fortunes failed, so she travelled at the age of 22 to Vienna to study voice. Thereafter she went to Paris and studied with Manuel García II, who was to have the foremost influence on her. She made her debut as a singer in 1844, and had a short career in opera and recital. Her voice, however, was only adequate, so she moved to teaching in 1849. In 1852, she married Italian baritone Salvatore Marchesi (pseudonym of Salvatore de Castrone della Rajata) (d. 1908).

It was in this field that she would become famous. She taught at the conservatory in Cologne and, in the 1870s at the Vienna Conservatory, where she tutored Marie Fillunger among others. In 1881 she opened her own school at No. 88 Rue Jouffroy-d'Abbans in Paris, where she was to remain for most of her life. Ultimately, she was best known as the vocal teacher of a number of great singers. The most famous among them is perhaps Nellie Melba, but she also trained such illustrious singers as Emma Calvé, Frances Alda, Ellen Gulbranson, Gertrude Auld Thomas, Selma Kurz, Maikki Järnefelt, and Emma Eames. Marchesi died in London in 1913. The mother of Joan Sutherland was taught by a pupil of Marchesi.

== Teachings ==
Marchesi was clearly committed to the bel canto style of singing. Despite this, she did not particularly identify herself as a bel canto teacher. She asserted that there were only two styles of singing: "the good...and the bad" and argued that a properly trained vocalist could sing the old bel canto style just as easily as the then newer, more dramatic style.

She was generally an advocate of a naturalistic style of singing: she called for a fairly instinctive method of breathing and argued against the "smiling" mouth position that many teachers of her day preferred. She was particularly concerned with vocal registration, calling it "the Alpha and Omega of the formation and development of the female voice, the touchstone of all singing methods, old and new." She also repeatedly expressed disdain for the teachers of her day who offered methods that they asserted would fully develop the voice in only a year or two. Instead, she felt that vocal training was best approached at a slow and deliberate pace.

Two of the most distinctive features of her teachings were her "analytical method" and her insistence on very short practice times for beginners. Her "analytical method" placed great importance on intellectually understanding both the technical and the aesthetic nature of everything sung, from grand arias to simple vocal exercises. She argued that rote practice without understanding was ultimately harmful to the artistic use of the voice. Most distinctively, though, she insisted on very short practice times for beginners, as little as five minutes at a stretch three or four times a day for absolute beginners. Of course, as the voice matured those times could and should be expanded.

== Pupils ==
Among her pupils were:

- Suzanne Adams
- Frances Alda
- Sigrid Arnoldson
- Blanche Arral
- Kate Bensberg
- Jenny Broch
- Nadina Bulcioff
- Emma Calvé
- Ada Crossley
- Ilma de Murska
- May De Sousa
- Marie Duma
- Emma Eames
- Emma Engdahl-Jägerskiöld
- Rose Ettinger
- Ethel Fiske
- Antonietta Fricci
- Marie Fillunger
- Mary Garden
- Etelka Gerster
- Maikki Järnefelt
- Louise Johnson-Missievitch
- Jeanne Jomelli
- Božena Kacerovská
- Mai Kalna
- Katharina Klafsky
- Gabrielle Krauss
- Selma Kurz
- Miriam Licette
- Estelle Liebling
- Blanche Marchesi (her daughter)
- Dame Nellie Melba
- Yevgeniya Mravina
- Louise Natali-Graham
- Emma Nevada
- Aglaja Orgeni
- Gina Oselio
- Regina Pacini
- Rosa Papier
- Anna Pessiak-Schmerling
- Marta Petrini
- Sedohr Rhodes
- Louise Rieger
- Sarah Robinson-Duff
- Elyda Russell
- Caroline Salla
- Sibyl Sanderson
- Frances Saville
- Evelyn Scotney
- Nadina Slaviansky
- Georgina Stirling
- Maggie Stirling
- Florence Toronta
- Guillaume Tremelli
- Florence Turner-Maley
- Inez McCune Williamson
- Ellen Beach Yaw
- Nadezhda Zabela-Vrubel

(Some pupils were noted on an 1899 dedicatory poster, Anniversary Fete – fifty years professorship, Mathilde Marchesi, 1849–1899).

== Family ==
Her daughter, Blanche Marchesi (1863–1940), a contralto, also a noted singer and teacher, made her début at a young age. She first appeared in opera at Prague in 1900, and subsequently sang at Covent Garden in 1902 and 1903. She was an admired concert singer.
