= Gertrude Auld Thomas =

American opera singer

Gertrude Auld Thomas (May 24, 1872 – December 18, 1959) was an American soprano who sang major operatic roles and also composed operas, usually under the name Gertrude Auld.

Auld was born in Santa Cruz, California, to Mary Ellen Simpton and Ossian Gregory Auld. She married Arthur Benjamin Thomas on May 9, 1895, and they had one son, Arthur Auld Thomas, in 1901.

Auld studied music for three years in Paris and London before returning to California. She studied voice with Mathilde Marchesi, a well-known proponent of bel canto singing.

Auld toured throughout America, giving vocal recitals and lectures on topics such as "The Relation of Music to Art." She was managed by John W. Frothingham Inc. She also sang major opera roles, including Mimi in Giacomo Puccini's opera La Boheme, and Marguerite in Charles Gounod's opera Faust.

Auld was a member of Sigma Alpha Iota. She sang in at least two recordings: Edison 290810 in 1914 and Victor Trial 1916-07-18-01 in 1916. She composed at least two operas, Hazila and The Overland Trail.
