= Jenny Broch =

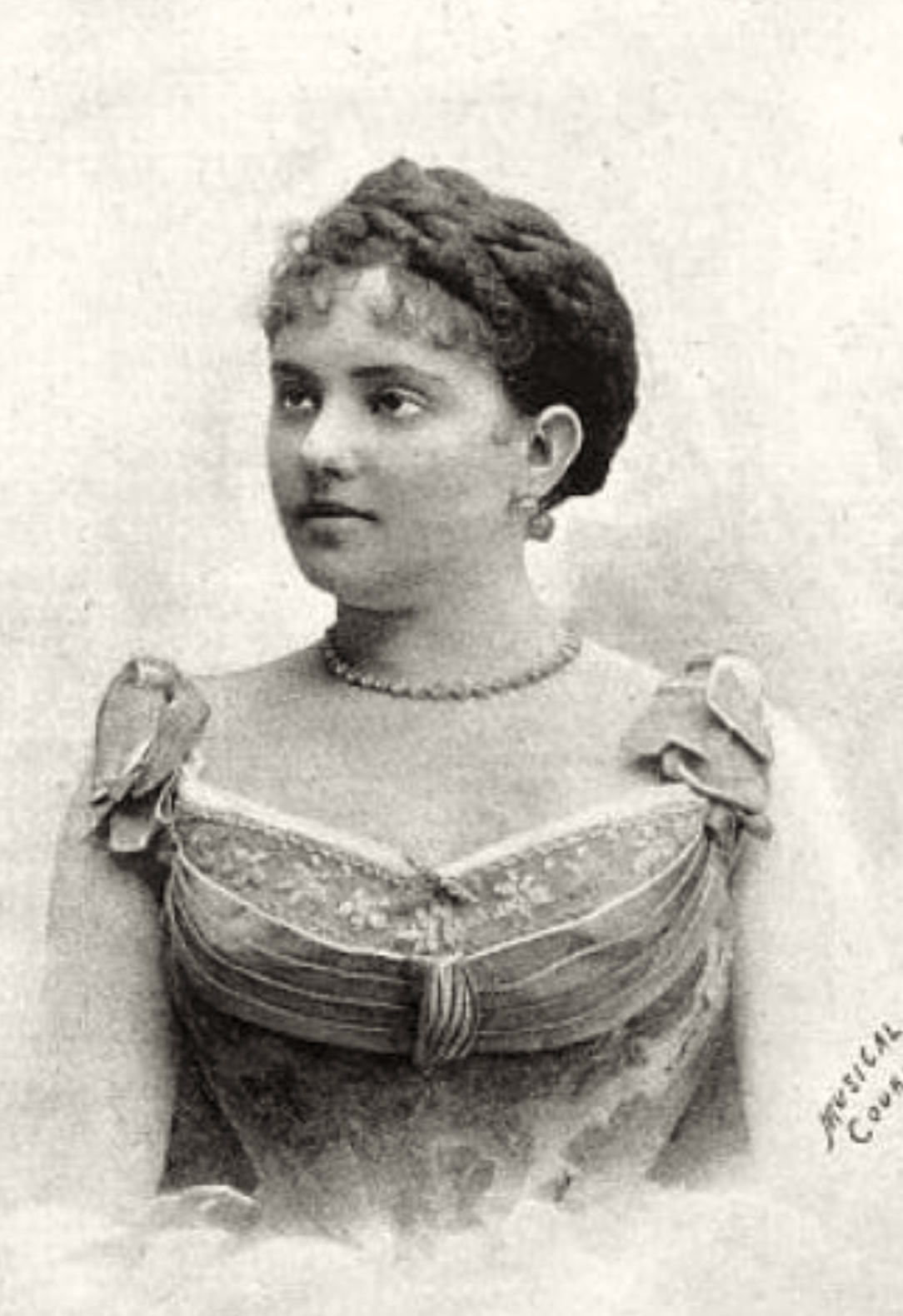

Jenny Broch, sometimes given as Jennie Broch, (born 1864 – died after 1911) was an Austrian coloratura soprano who had an active international career in operas and concerts from 1885 through 1901. She was trained by Mathilde Marchesi in her native city of Vienna where she began her career at the Vienna Hofoper. She performed at several important theaters during her career; among them the Metropolitan Opera in New York, Her Majesty's Theatre, London, and the Berlin Hofoper. She ended her career at the Stadttheater Elberfeld in 1901.

== Life and career ==
Jenny Broch was born in Vienna, Austria in 1864. She studied singing in her native city with the famous voice teacher Mathilde Marchesi beginning in c. 1883. She received good reviews in the international press in a recital in Paris featuring Marchesi's students in March 1885. That same year she made her professional opera debut at the Vienna Hofoper. She toured England with the Mapleson Opera Company in 1886; making her UK debut at the Alexandra Theatre in Liverpool as Rosina in The Barber of Seville under conductor Luigi Arditi and with Giuseppe Del Puente as Figaro. One of the stops on this tour included performances in operas at the Theatre Royal, Manchester where in addition to Rosina she also performed the part of Amina in La sonnambula. Other performances were given at the Theatre Royal, Glasgow and the Theatre Royal, Edinburgh where her repertoire included the title role in Lucia di Lammermoor.

Broch performed with Mapleson's company in London' making her first appearance it that city as Lucia at Her Majesty's Theatre, London on June 4, 1887. This was followed by performances as Rosina with Mariano Padilla y Ramos as Figaro. Her other performances in 1887 included appearances at the Berlin Hofoper (as Lucia and Amina), Theater Basel, and the Teatro Apollo in Rome (as Leila in Les pêcheurs de perles). Over the next three years she worked as a guest artist in mainly Eastern Europe and Russia; appearing in opera houses in Kiev, Kharkov, Moscow, St. Petersburg, and Warsaw. In 1890 she was a guest artist at the Vienna State Opera where she performed the parts of Marie in La fille du régiment and Rosina.

In 1890-1891 Broch was a principal soprano at the Metropolitan Opera ("Met") in New York City. She made her debut at the Metropolitan Opera House on December 3, 1890 as Marguerite de Valois in Giacomo Meyerbeer's Les Huguenots with Heinrich Gudehus as Raoul de Nangis and Walter Damrosch conducting. Her other repertoire at the Met included Inès in L'Africaine, Margiana in Der Barbier von Bagdad, Wellgunde in The Ring Cycle, and Walödvogel in Siegfried.

After leaving New York, Broch was a resident soprano at the Staatsoper Stuttgart from 1891-1894 where she had what Karl-Josef Kutsch and Leo Riemens described as a "brilliant career" as a coloratura soprano in roles like Amina, Lucia, and Marie. Other parts in her repertoire included Susanna in The Marriage of Figaro, Zerlina in Don Giovanni, and the title roles in Dinorah and Martha.

Broch married the actor and director Kurt Stern (1871-1911). She retired from performance in 1895, but then returned to the stage in 1899 at the Theater des Westens in Berlin. There she portrayed Rautendelein in the world premiere of Heinrich Zöllner's Die versunkene Glocke on 8 July 1899. She appeared as a guest in 1900 at the Staatstheater Braunschweig. She ended her career as a resident artist at the Stadttheater Elberfeld in 1900-1901. After the death of her husband in 1911 she lived in Berlin.
