= Mai Kalna =

American opera singer

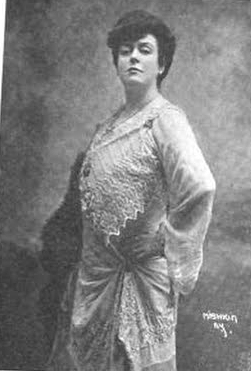
- Mai Kalna, from a 1917 publication.
- Born: 1875; California
- Died: 1934 (aged 58–59)
- Other names: Mai Kalna-Norcross (after marriage)
- Occupation: soprano

Mai Kalna (1875–1934) was an American soprano opera singer.

== Early life ==
Mai Kalna was from San Francisco, California, the daughter of Margaret E. Convis. She was educated in France. She studied voice with Mathilde Marchesi, and pursued further voice and dramatic training in Munich with Felix Mottl and in Berlin with Rosa Sucher. She also studied with Cosima Wagner at Bayreuth.

== Career ==
As a young singer in London, she sang in operas starring Nellie Melba, Emma Albani, and Adelina Patti. She sang the title role of Carmen in several European cities. Her Berlin debut was in Don Giovanni. In 1906 she was part of a concert in Prague to raise relief funds after the 1906 San Francisco earthquake. In 1908 she joined the Carl Rosa Opera Company. She toured India, China, Singapore, and southeast Asia in 1914. While she was touring in Asia, the soprano Lillian Nordica died in Indonesia; Kalna was marketed to Nordica's audiences for the rest of her tour.

When World War I began, she returned to the United States, but lost many of her belongings in the haste of her travels. She and her husband appeared at a benefit concert for the American Red Cross on Long Island in 1917; she also gave a benefit concert for Sherbrooke Hospital in Quebec that year. In 1918 she was described as "modishly magnificent" in the New York Times, when she gave a concert at the Princess Theatre. That same year she appeared in vaudeville in a production of The Reclamation by Clifford Parker.

In 1922 she was touring the United States as Brünhilde in a production of Die Walküre, with the United States Opera Company. She also sang for radio concerts in the 1920s.

Kalna and her husband wrote songs together, including Valse Californienne (1918). In 1921 they were both elected trustees of the First Independent Christian Science Church, a breakaway Christian Science congregation in New York City, headed by Helena Barwis.

== Personal life ==
Mai Kalna married fellow American singer Webster Norcross. She died in 1934, aged 59 years.
