= Louny =

Town in the Czech Republic

- Town
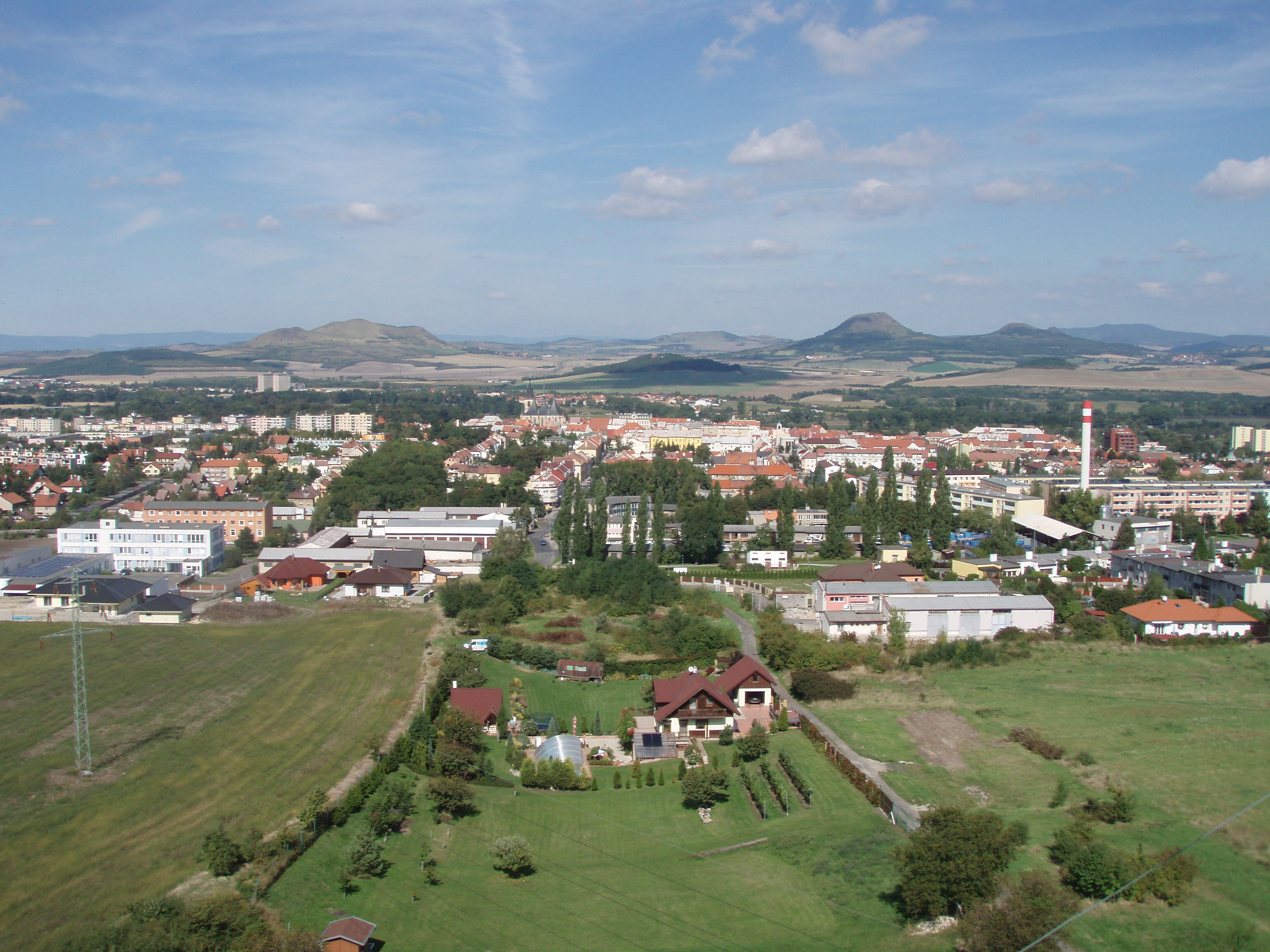
- View from the south

- Flag Coat of arms

- Location in the Czech Republic
- Coordinates: 50°21′26″N 13°47′49″E
- Country: Czech Republic
- Region: Ústí nad Labem
- District: Louny
- First mentioned: 1115

Government
  - Mayor: Pavel Janda (TOP 09)

Area
  - Total: 24.14 km^{2} (9.32 sq mi)
- Elevation: 185 m (607 ft)

Population (2026-01-01)
  - Total: 18,061
  - Density: 748.2/km^{2} (1,938/sq mi)
- Time zone: UTC+1 (CET)
  - Summer (DST): UTC+2 (CEST)
- Postal code: 440 01
- Website: www.mulouny.cz

Louny (Czech pronunciation: [ˈlounɪ]; German: Laun) is a town in the Ústí nad Labem Region of the Czech Republic. It has about 18,000 inhabitants. It lies on the Ohře River. The historic town centre is well preserved and is protected as an urban monument zone. The most important monument is the Church of Saint Nicholas.

== Administrative division ==
Louny consists of three municipal parts (in brackets population according to the 2021 census):

- Louny (17,318)
- Brloh (143)
- Nečichy (102)

Brloh forms an exclave of the municipal territory.

== Etymology ==
The origin of the name Louny is unclear. Older theories, which are less likely, link the name to the personal name Lún, to the Czech word lůno (literally 'womb', but here meaning 'valley'), to the bird luňák (i.e. 'kite'), or even to the Celtic word louwn ('lawn'). More modern and more likely theories attribute the origin of the name to the Old Czech words lunúti ('to flow fast') and lúňa / lúna ('current'), which refer to the local flow of the Ohře River.

== Geography ==
Louny is located about 38 kilometres (24 mi) southeast of Ústí nad Labem and 49 km (30 mi) northwest of Prague. It lies mostly in the Lower Ohře Table, but a small northern part of the municipal territory extends into the Central Bohemian Uplands and includes the highest point of Louny at 301 m (988 ft) above sea level. The Ohře River flows through the town.

== History ==
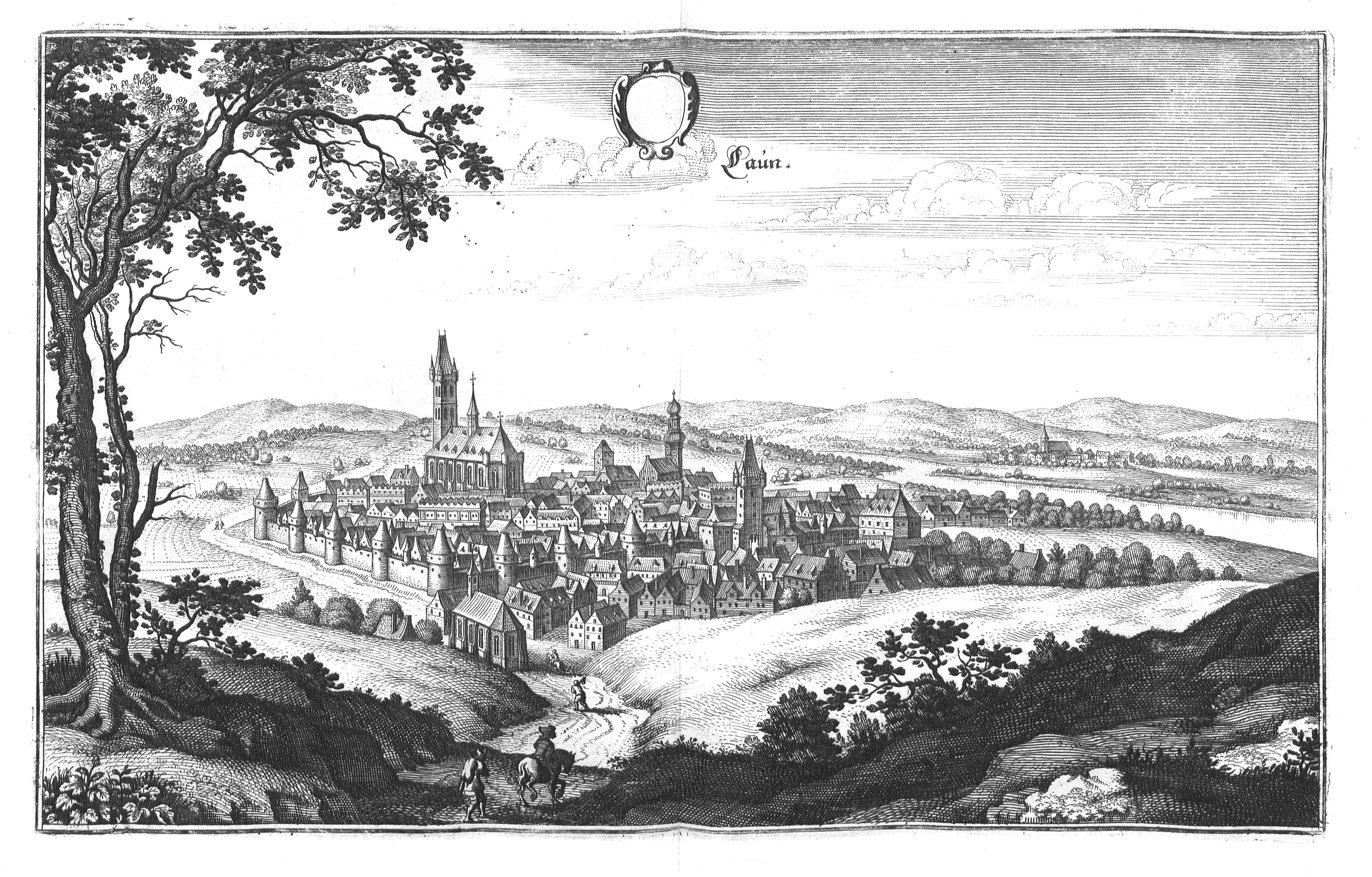
Louny in 1650; engraving by Matthäus Merian the Elder

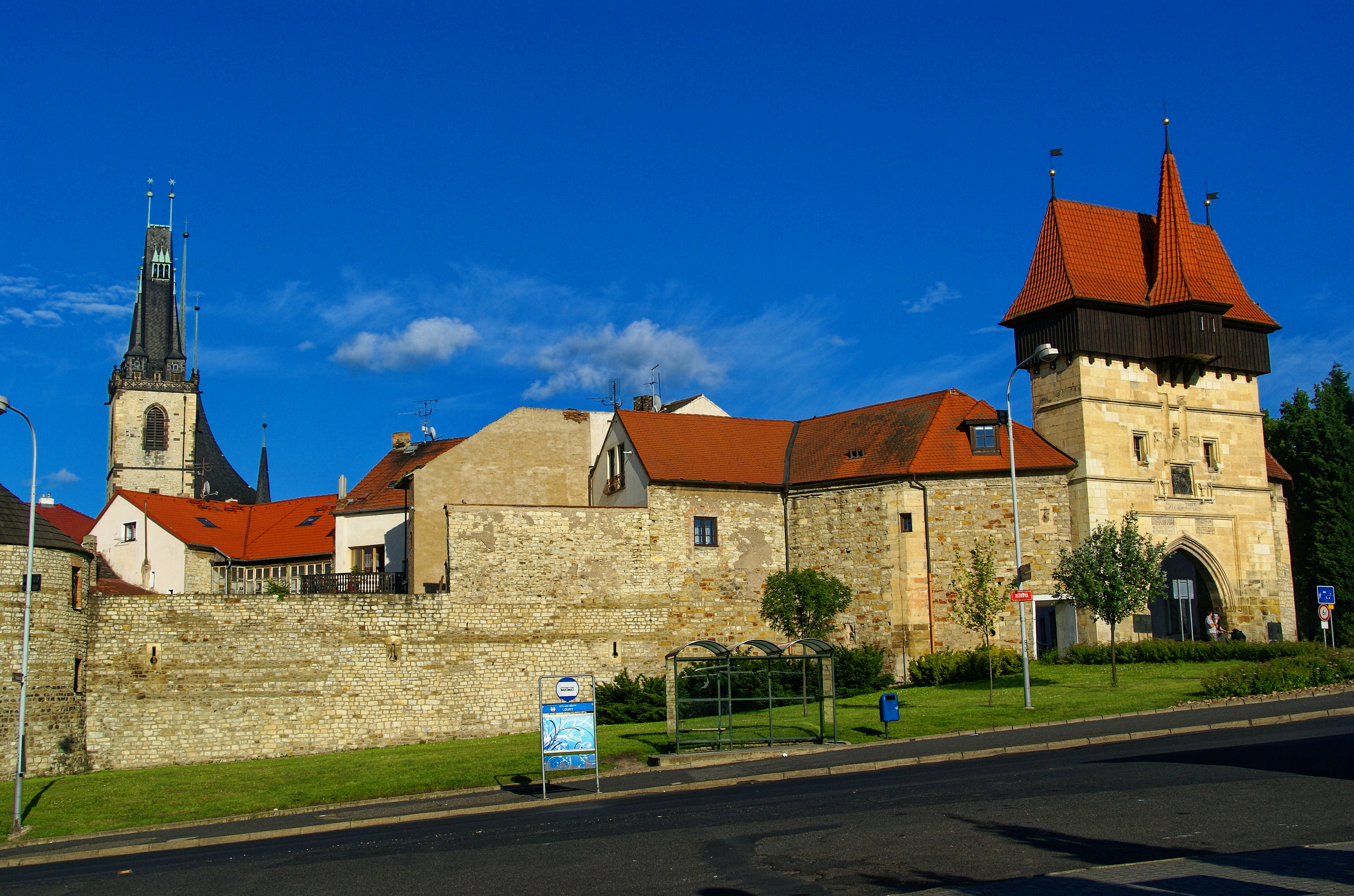
Town walls with the Žatec Gate

Already at the turn of the 11th and 12th centuries there was a settlement named Luna, located on the site of today's Church of Saint Peter. The first written mention of the settlement is from 1115, when it was a property of the Kladruby Monastery. In the 1260s, a royal town was founded at its place by King Ottokar II. It was located on two important traffic routes, river Ohře and the road from Prague to Nuremberg. Together with the town a Benedictine monastery was founded, but it was destroyed during the Hussite Wars.

The town rapidly developed in the 15th century, when the Church of Saint Peter, Church of the Mother of God and town fortifications were built. After a fire in 1517, the town was severely damaged and had to be rebuilt, and a new church (Church of Saint Nicholas) was built.

During the 19th century and then in the 1960s and 1970s, there was extensive demolitions in the historical town and many valuable Renaissance houses and parts of town fortifications were destroyed. The economic development of Louny occurred in the second half of the 19th century, when railway repair shops, sugar factory, brewery, slaughterhouses, mills and financial institutions were founded. After 1945, industrialisation of Louny continued.

Until 1918, the town was part of Austria-Hungary, in the district of the same name, one of the 94 Bezirkshauptmannschaften in Bohemia.

== Demographics ==
Historical population

Year	Pop.	±%
1869	4,260	—
1880	5,938	+39.4%
1890	6,814	+14.8%
1900	10,698	+57.0%
1910	12,034	+12.5%

Year	Pop.	±%
1921	12,266	+1.9%
1930	12,413	+1.2%
1950	12,356	−0.5%
1961	12,537	+1.5%
1970	13,452	+7.3%

Year	Pop.	±%
1980	17,543	+30.4%
1991	20,812	+18.6%
2001	19,639	−5.6%
2011	18,121	−7.7%
2021	17,563	−3.1%

Source: Censuses

== Economy ==
The town lies on a railway junction and a factory for overhauling railway engines and rolling stock, later known as Heavy Machinery Services, was established in 1873. It was a major employer and contributed to the town's expansion during the early 20th century. The company was the town's largest employer until 2014, when it went bankrupt. Since 2019, the industrial complex is rented to the DAKO-CZ company, which is a brake system manufacturer for rolling stock.

Other industries include a brewery (from the hops which are grown in the region) and a factory making porcelain electrical insulators for power cables. The largest employer with headquarters in Louny is Fujikoki Czech company, producer of thermostatic expansion valves used in car air conditioners.

== Transport ==
Several railway lines run through Louny: Most–Rakovník, Česká Lípa–Postoloprty and Louny–Kralupy nad Vltavou. The town is served by three train stations: Louny, Louny střed and Louny město.

== Sights ==
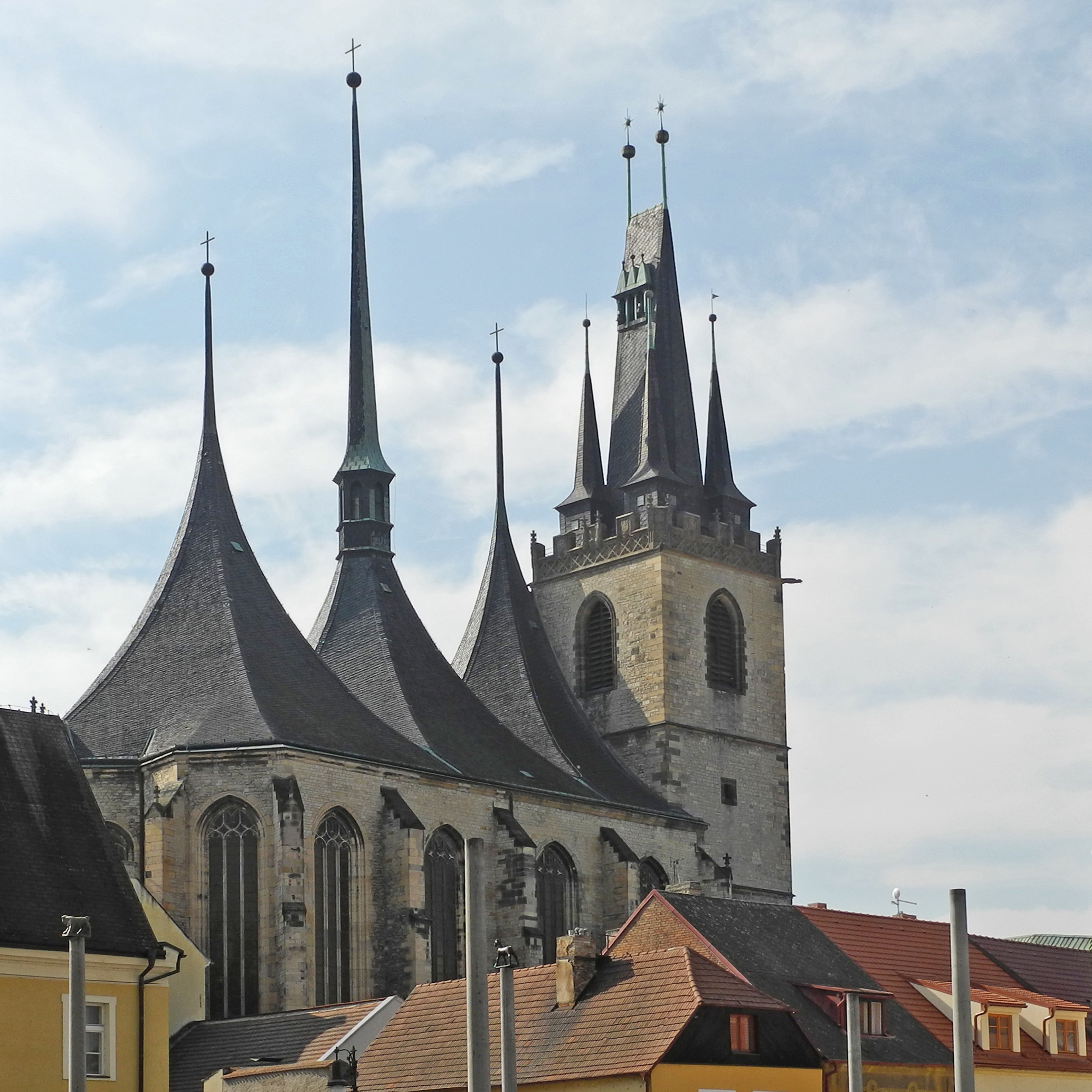
Church of Saint Nicholas

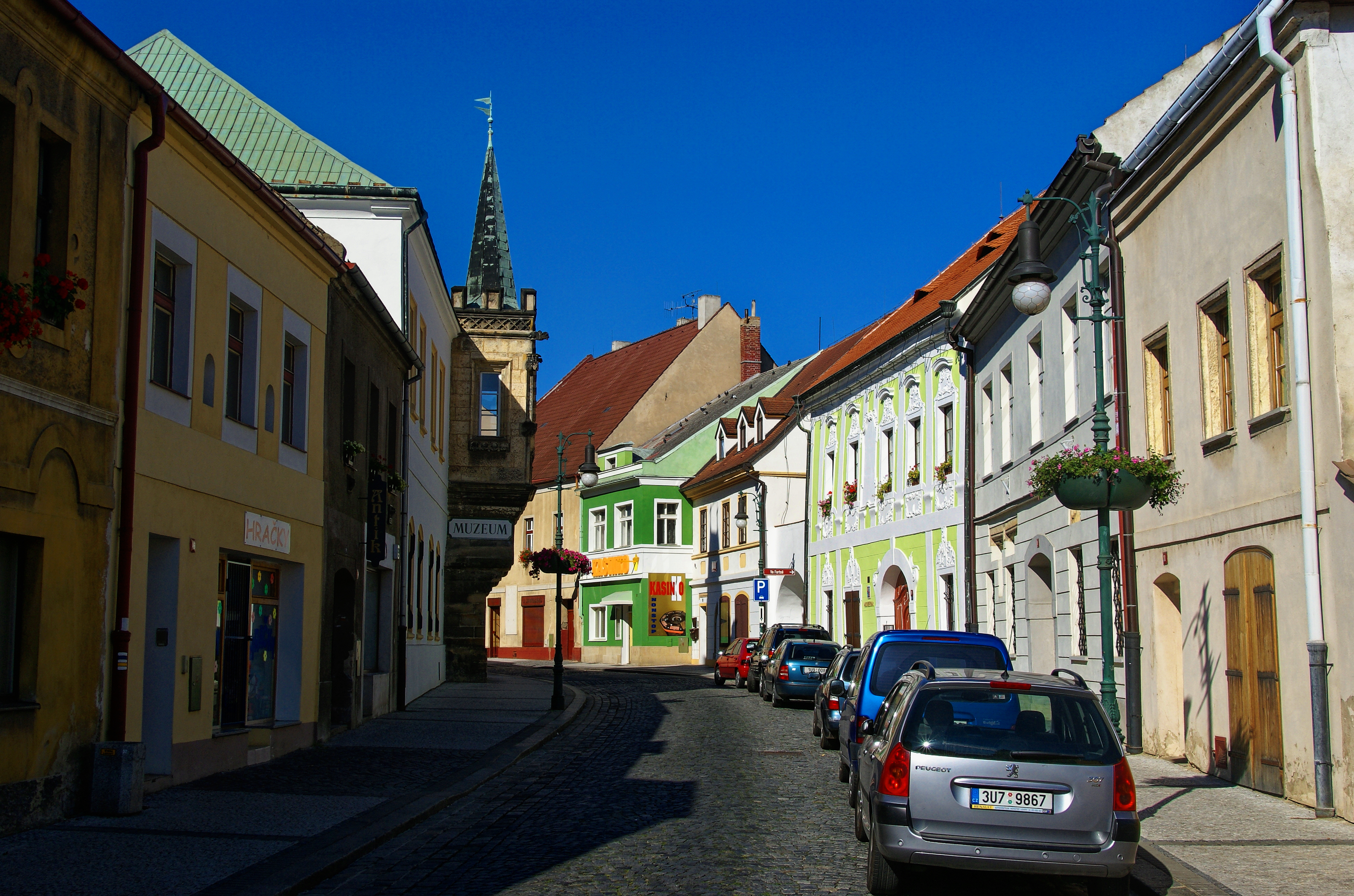
Regional museum in Pivovarská street

The most important architectural feature is the Church of Saint Nicholas, built in the late Gothic style in 1519–1538. One of its architects was Benedikt Rejt. It incorporates a tower from an earlier church which was otherwise destroyed along with most of the town by a major fire in 1517. Other significant churches in the town are the Church of Saint Peter from the 14th–15th centuries, the Church of the Mother of God from 1493 and the Church of the Fourteen Holy Helpers from 1716.

The historic centre of Louny is formed by the square Mírové náměstí and its surroundings. The town hall on the square is a Neo-Renaissance building from 1887. The most valuable building on the square is a Renaissance house, today the seat of the district archive.

Parts of the town ramparts remain, as does the Žatec Gate that dates from 1500.

== Notable people ==
- Jaroslav Vrchlický (1853–1912), poet
- Václav Hlavatý (1894–1969), mathematician
- Otakar Jaroš (1912–1943), military officer
- Božena Kacerovská (1880–1970), opera singer
- Zdeněk Sýkora (1920–2011), painter
- Milan Kymlicka (1936–2008), Czech-Canadian arranger, composer and conductor
- Jakub Michálek (born 1989), politician
- Karolína Plíšková (born 1992), tennis player
- Kristýna Plíšková (born 1992), tennis player

== Twin towns – sister cities ==
Louny is twinned with:

- Barendrecht, Netherlands
- Lučenec, Slovakia
- Moret-Loing-et-Orvanne, France
- Susaki, Japan
- Zschopau, Germany
