= Jeanne Jomelli =

Dutch soprano opera singer, concert singer and music educator

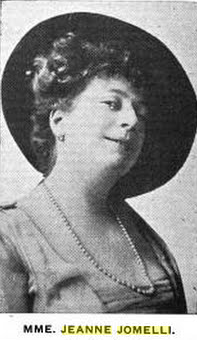
Jeanne Jomelli, from a 1917 publication

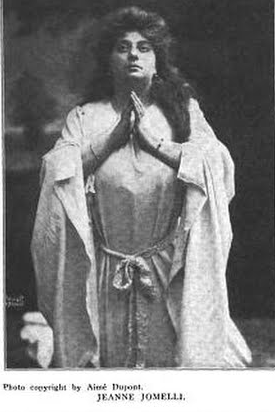
Jeanne Jomelli in costume, from a 1908 publication

Jeanne Jomelli (May 18, 1879 – August 29, 1932) was a Dutch soprano opera singer, concert singer, and music educator.

== Early life ==
Jeanne Jomelli was born in Amsterdam. She studied voice under Mathilde Marchesi in Paris.

== Career ==
Jomelli made her American debut at the Metropolitan Opera House in 1906. In 1909 an aria, "The Call of Râdha" by Harriet Ware, with lyrics by Sarojini Naidu, was dedicated to Jomelli. Jomelli herself set a Heinrich Heine poem, "Oft I wept while dreaming", to music in 1912. "Mme. Jomelli had a pure soprano voice of singularly clear, steady, musical quality, and she was an accomplished vocalist," recalled Herman Klein, who worked with her on improving her English diction.

She was in Belgium at the start of World War I and lost nineteen trunks of costumes and other possessions in the rush to leave ahead of German advances. Instead she toured western Canadian cities with composer Hallett Gilberté during the war, giving benefit concerts for wounded veterans. In 1917, she gave a concert in Los Angeles singing songs by Charles Wakefield Cadman, with Cadman himself accompanying her on piano.

For the 1917/1918 academic year, Jomelli was engaged to teach at Cornish School of Music in Seattle, Washington. However, she needed surgery for tonsillitis in September 1917, which brought long-term health complications, and she taught while seated thereafter.

Jomelli moved to Oakland, California, in 1918, and taught voice at the University of California, Berkeley. She stayed in the San Francisco Bay area for most of her remaining years, though she also spent significant time teaching in Honolulu, Hawaii, at the Punahou School.

== Personal life ==
Jeanne Jomelli was first married in 1901, to a French tapestry maker, Nicolas Hernance. They divorced amicably in 1913. Her second husband was her manager, W. Orrin Backus. She died in August 1932, aged 53 years, in San Francisco, California. Very soon after Jomelli's death, Orrin Backus remarried; when his new wife left him, in fear of his violent threats, he died in November 1932 by suicide.
