= Ida Matton =

Swedish sculptor (1863–1940)

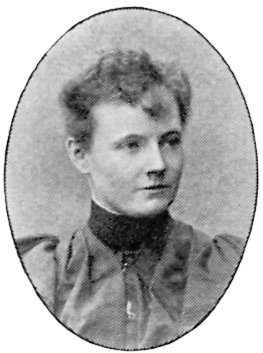
- Born: 24 February 1863; Gävle, Sweden
- Died: 7 July 1940 (aged 89); Gävle, Sweden
- Known for: Sculpture

Ida Elisabeth Matton (1863–1940), was a Swedish sculptor.

== Biography ==
Matton was born on 24 February 1863 in Gävle. She studied at Kungliga Tekniska högskolan in Stockholm She subsequently traveled to Paris to continue her studies. There she attended the Académie Colarossi and the Académie Julian.

In 1888 she exhibited at the Paris Salon. She continued exhibiting her work in Europe; in 1896 at the Salon des Artistes Français in Paris, in 1897 at the Art Exhibition in Stockholm, in 1900 at the Exposition Universelle, and in 1901 at the Art Exhibition in Gefle.

She also exhibited her work at the Palace of Fine Arts at the 1893 World's Columbian Exposition in Chicago, Illinois.

Ida Matton was also a landscape painter, she exhibited her works from Lapland in 1927. Another famous work by Matton is the sculpture Loki's Punishment, which dates from 1905 and was executed in marble and exhibited at the Paris Salon in 1909. It was cast in bronze in 1936. In 1923, the marble sculpture was placed in the remains of the Old Riddarholm Bridge, the so-called "Palmstedt's Cave", within the Stockholm City Hall Park. Another Loki's Punishment was donated by her brother Emil Matton in 1938, on her 75th birthday, to the future Gävleborg Museum. In 1963, the museum organized a memorial exhibition of Matton with around 60 of her works. She received several awards in France and Italy and was awarded the 1927 Litteris et Artibus for sculpture. Matton is represented at, among others, the Nationalmuseum in Stockholm and the County Museum of Gävleborg in Gävle.

In 1914 with the outbreak of WWI Matton returned to Sweden. She moved back to Paris after the war, and then returned home to Gävle in 1932.

Matton died on 7 July 1940 in Gävle. Her Sculpted Portrait of a Woman is in the collection of the Nationalmuseum in Stockholm.

== Gallery ==
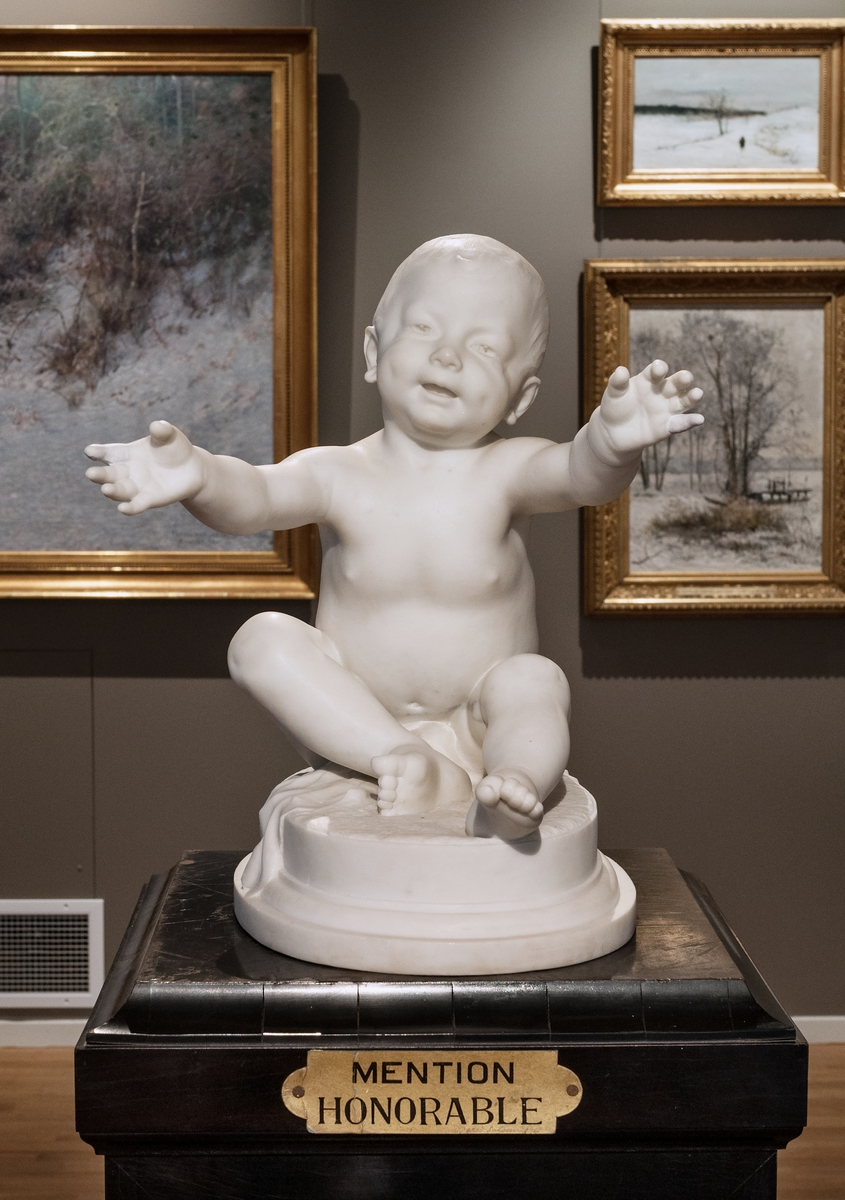
Bebé, County Museum Gävleborg

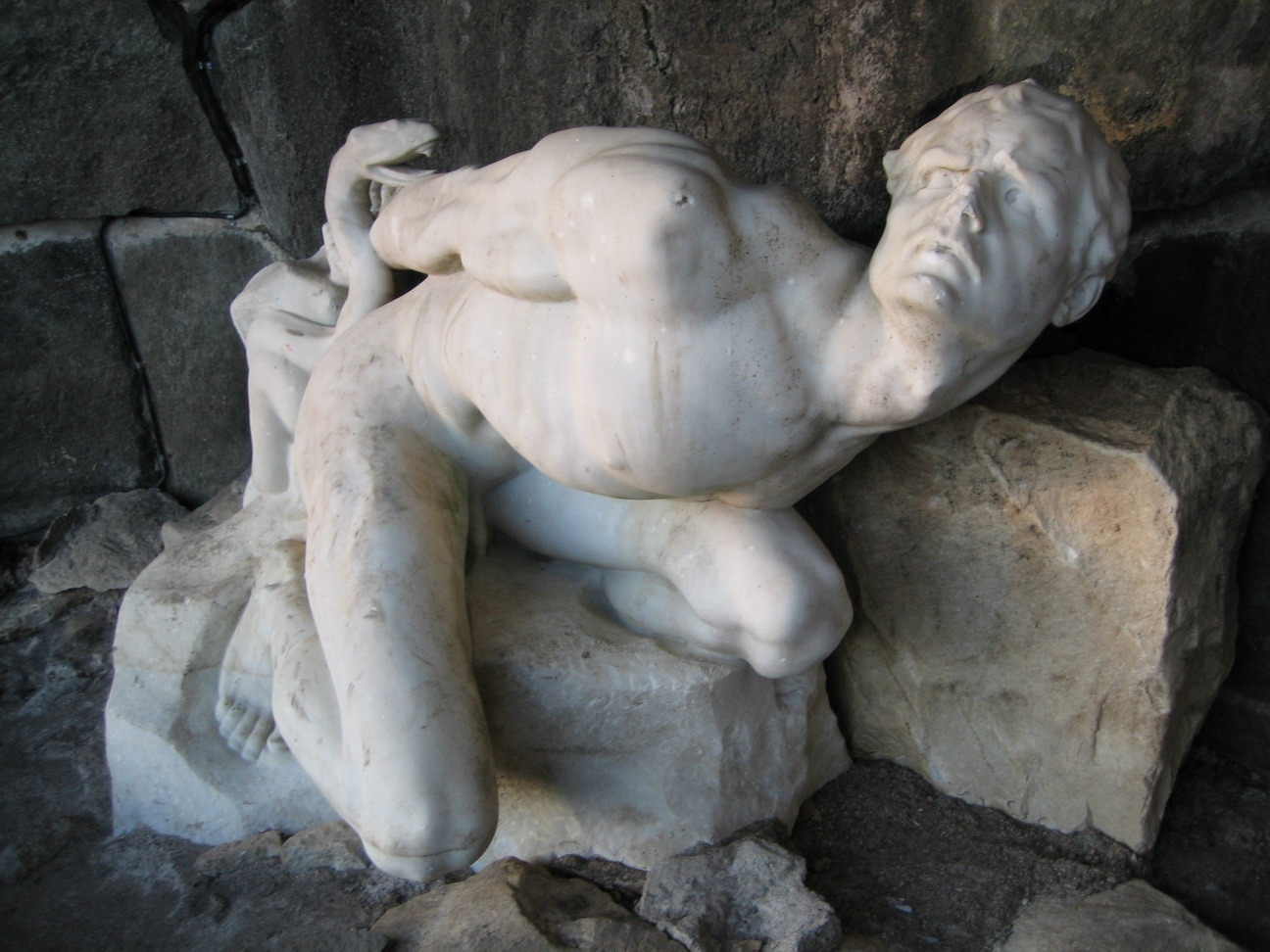
Loki's Punishment, 1923, Stockholm City Hall

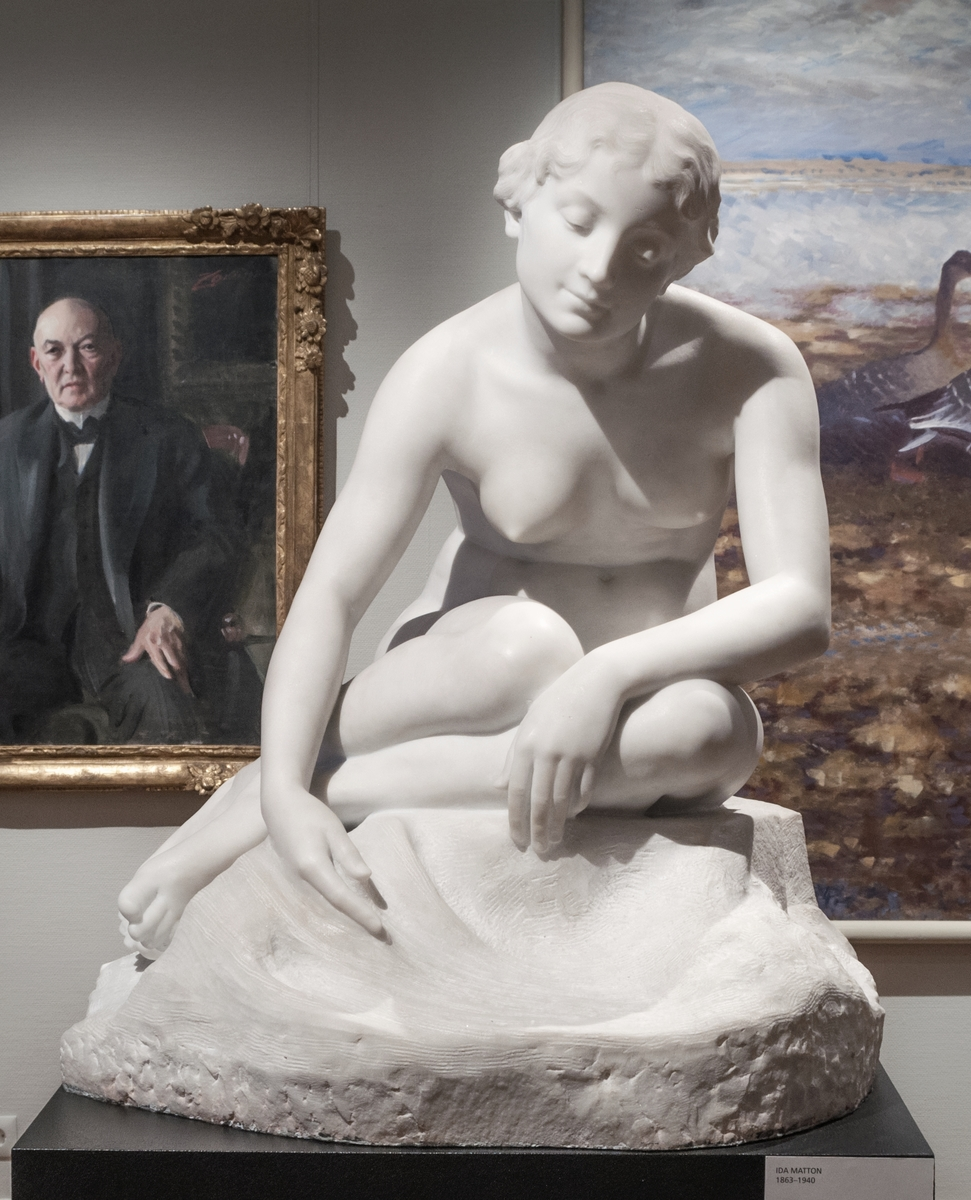
Dolce far niente, 1901, County Museum Gävleborg

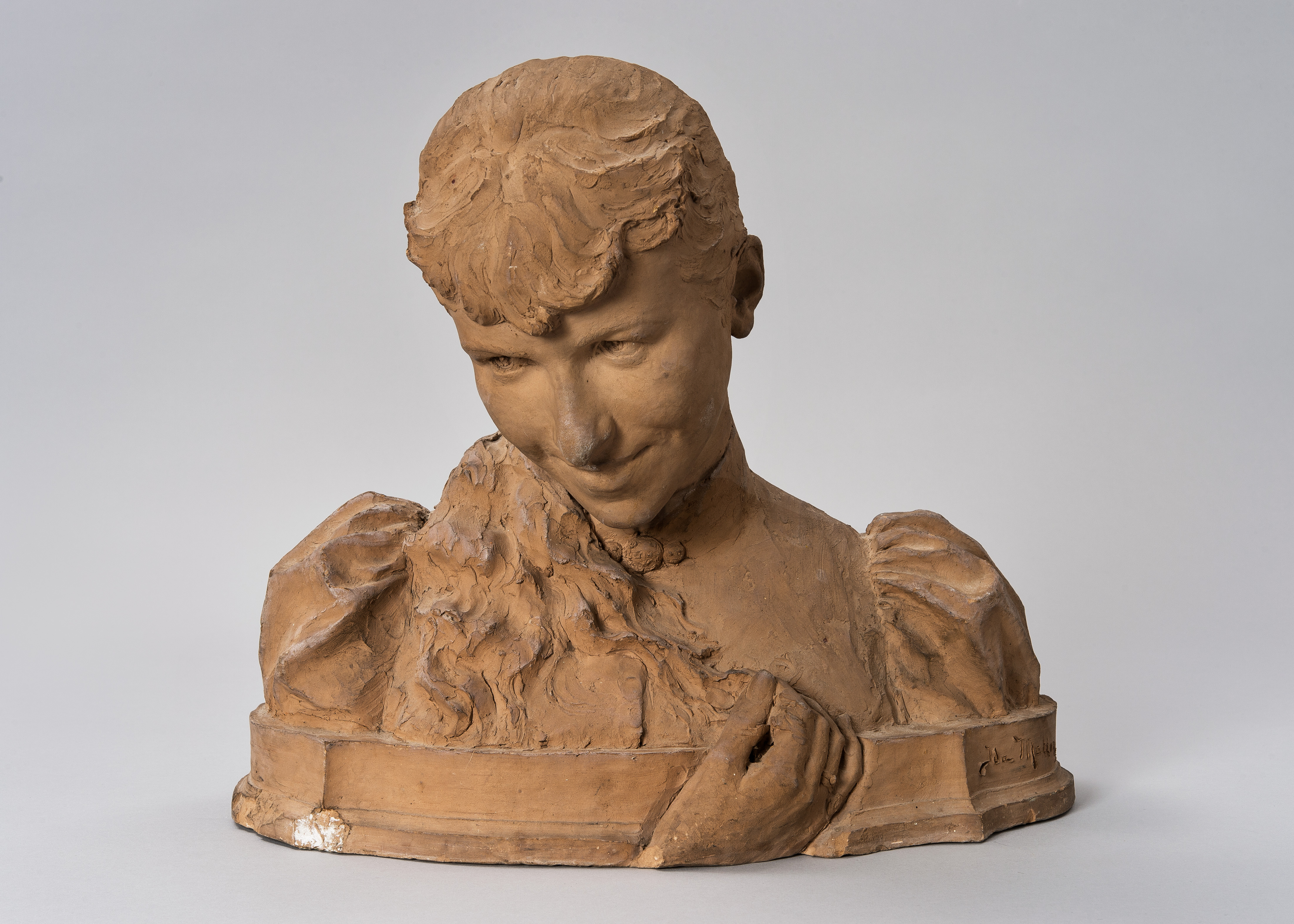
Sculpted Portrait of a Woman, 1891, Nationalmuseum

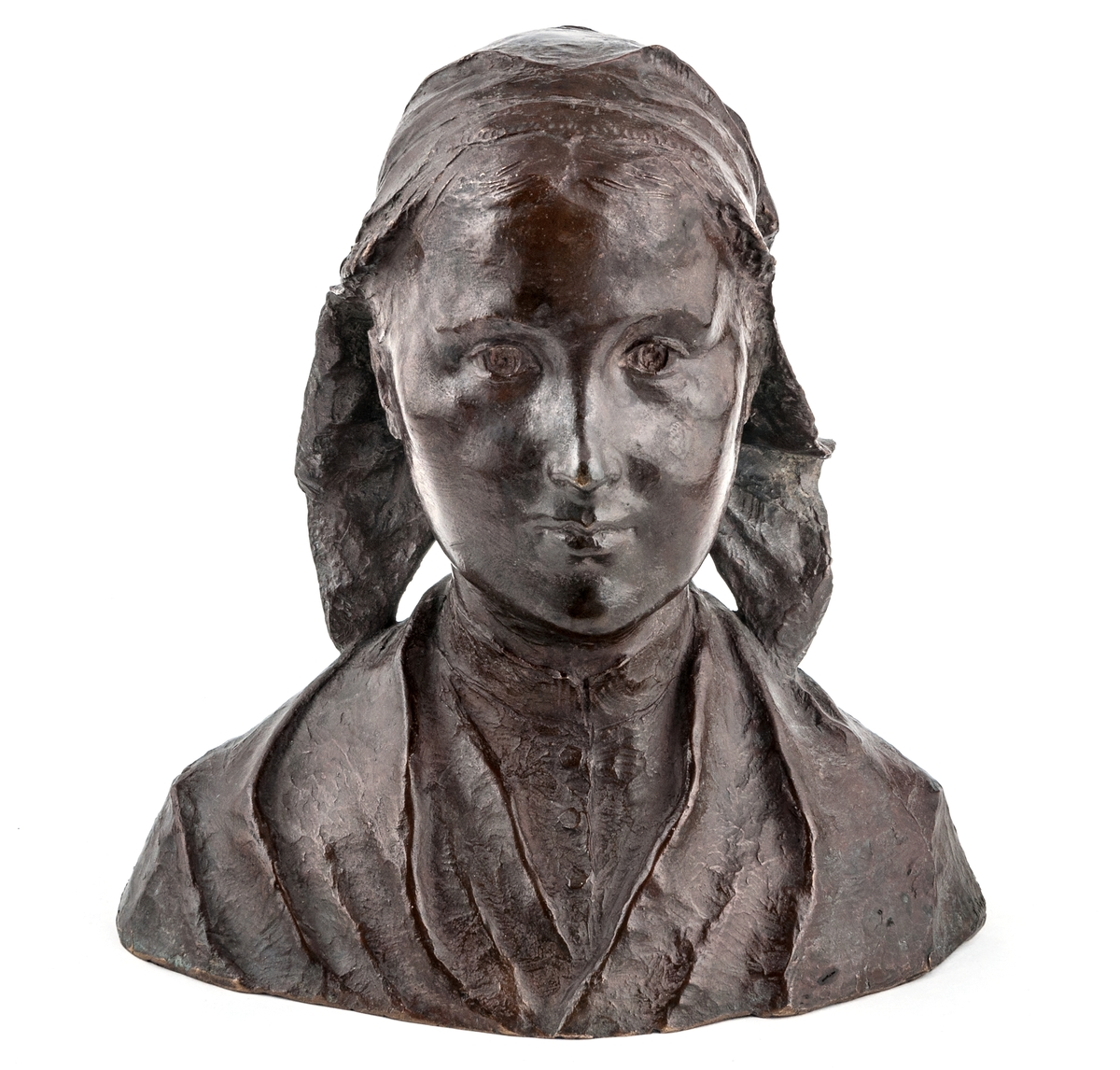
Brittany, 1896, County Museum Gävleborg

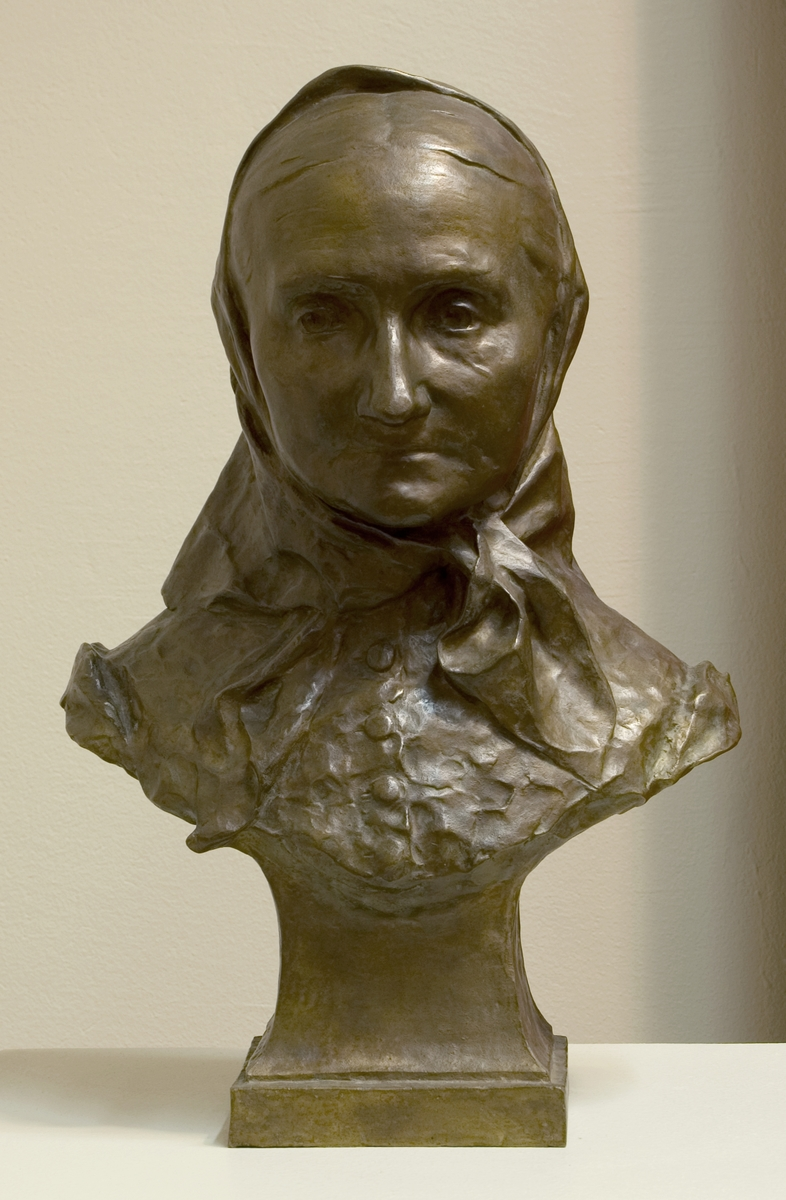
Mother, County Museum Gävleborg

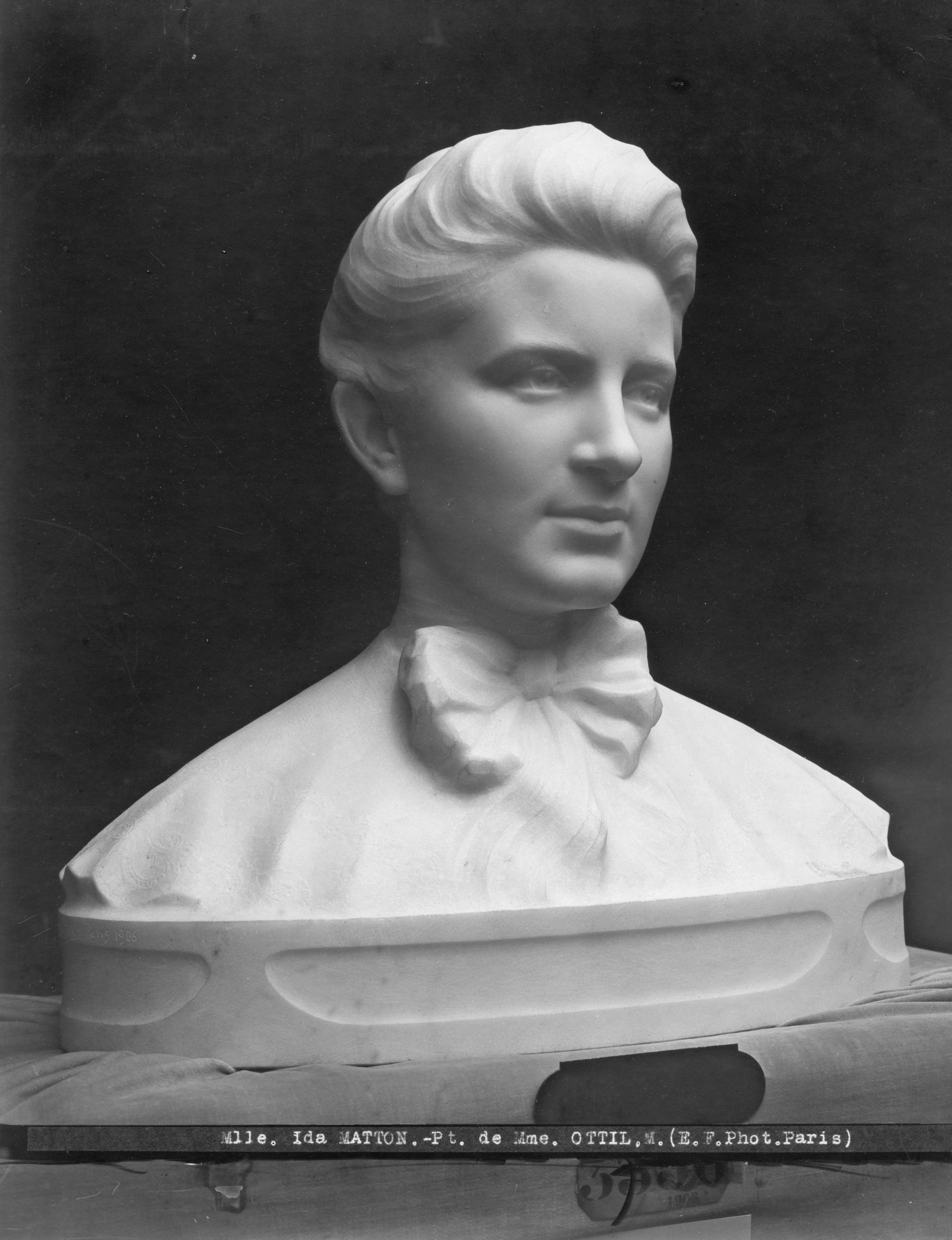
Bust of Ottil Matton, County Museum Gävleborg
