= Schozach-Bottwartal =

- Gemeindeverwaltungsverband
- Interactive map of Schozach-Bottwartal
- Location within Germany Location within Baden-Württemberg
- Coordinates: 49°03′N 9°15′E
- Country: Germany
- State: Baden-Württemberg
- Admin. region: Stuttgart
- District: Heilbronn
- Seat: Ilsfeld
- Subdivisions: 4 municipalities

Area
  - Total: 88.68 km^{2} (34.24 sq mi)

Population (2025-12-31)
  - Total: 29,930
  - Density: 337.5/km^{2} (874.1/sq mi)
- Time zone: UTC+01:00 (CET)
  - Summer (DST): UTC+02:00 (CEST)
- Website: www.gvv-sb.de

Schozach-Bottwartal is a Gemeindeverwaltungsverband in the district of Heilbronn in Baden-Württemberg, Germany. The seat of the Gemeindeverwaltungsverband is in Ilsfeld.

The Gemeindeverwaltungsverband Schozach-Bottwartal consists of the following municipalities:

1. Abstatt
2. Beilstein
3. Ilsfeld
4. Untergruppenbach
