= Ilsfeld =

- Municipality
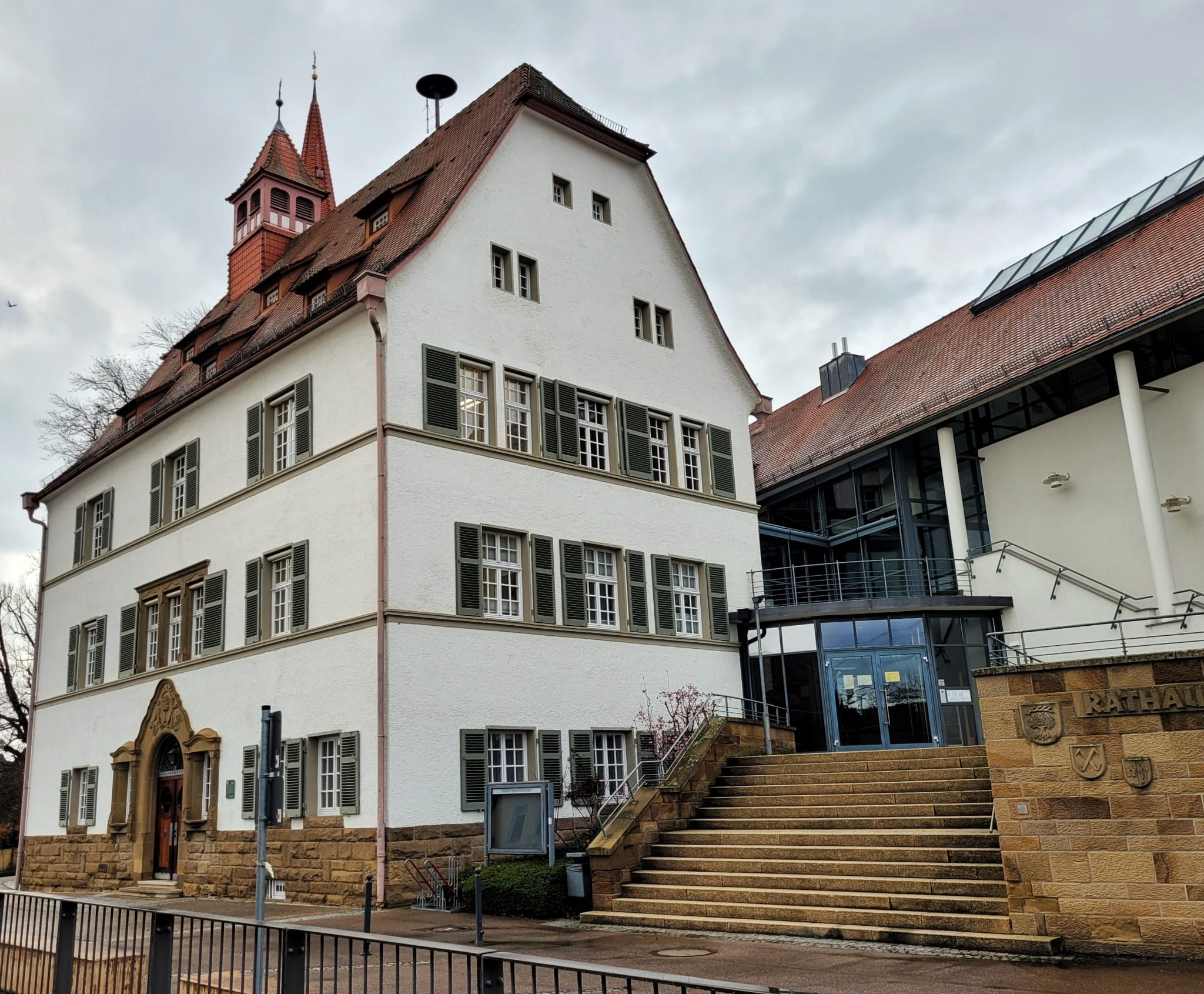
- Town hall

- Coat of arms

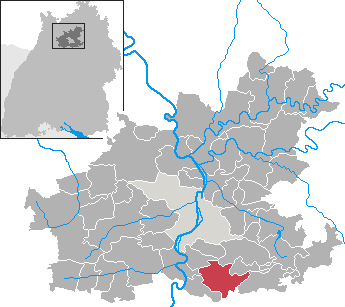
- Location of Ilsfeld within Heilbronn district
- Interactive map of Ilsfeld
- Location within Germany Location within Baden-Württemberg
- Coordinates: 49°3′N 9°15′E
- Country: Germany
- State: Baden-Württemberg
- Admin. region: Stuttgart
- District: Heilbronn
- Municipal assoc.: Schozach-Bottwartal
- Subdivisions: 6

Government
  - Mayor (2022–30): Bernd Bordon (SPD)

Area
  - Total: 26.51 km^{2} (10.24 sq mi)
- Elevation: 230 m (750 ft)

Population (2025-12-31)
  - Total: 9,806
  - Density: 369.9/km^{2} (958.0/sq mi)
- Time zone: UTC+01:00 (CET)
  - Summer (DST): UTC+02:00 (CEST)
- Postal codes: 74360
- Dialling codes: 07062
- Vehicle registration: HN
- Website: www.ilsfeld.de

Ilsfeld (German pronunciation: [ˈɪlsˌfɛlt]) is a municipality in the district of Heilbronn in Baden-Württemberg in Germany, on the outer edge of the Stuttgart Metropolitan Region. In addition to the village of Ilsfeld proper, it includes the formerly independent settlements of Auenstein and Schozach and some hamlets. Formerly predominantly agricultural, it has become more commercially oriented since an autobahn exit was built in the 1950s. The village of Ilsfeld was largely destroyed by a fire in 1904, and was rebuilt with public buildings in a rustic Württemberg style with Jugendstil elements.

== Geography ==
Ilsfeld is located in the south of the district of Heilbronn, in and around the valley of the Schozach near the point where the Gruppenbach flows into it. Parts of the town fall within two natural areas: Schwäbisch-Fränkische Waldberge (Swabian-Franconian Wooded Mountains) and Neckarbecken (Neckar Basin).

The town is bordered by (clockwise from the south): Großbottwar (in the district of Ludwigsburg), Neckarwestheim, Lauffen am Neckar, Talheim, Untergruppenbach, Abstatt and Beilstein (all in the district of Heilbronn). It is the seat of the Gemeindeverwaltungsverband (local government association) of Schozach-Bottwartal, whose other members are Abstatt, Beilstein and Untergruppenbach.

Ilsfeld proper, Auenstein and Schozach are sections of the town; the first also includes the hamlet of Wüstenhausen, the settlements of Landturm and Untere Mühle and the neighborhood of Engelsberghöfe, and Auenstein also includes two hamlets, Abstetterhof and Helfenberg. Ilsfeld proper also formerly included the no longer extant settlements of Beuren, Bustatt or Boestat, Gendach, Froßbach and Seetham, and Auenstein formerly included Finkenbach (now part of Helfenberg) and Kapfenhardt.

== History ==
=== Frankish court site ===
The territory of Ilsfeld has been settled almost without interruption since the Mesolithic and Neolithic. After the Franks expanded into the area, five ancient Alemannic settlements were subsumed in a royal court location that is the basis of the present-day town. At the former settlement of Gendach, on the Schozach near Ilsfeld, there was a small motte and bailey castle, no traces of which remain.

=== Border territory of Württemberg ===
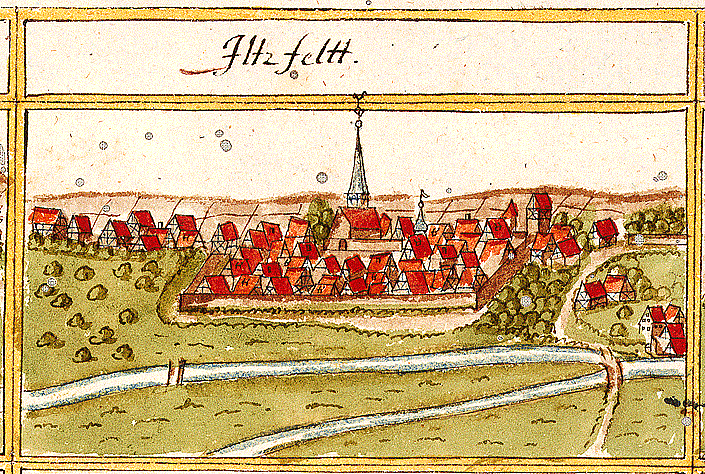
Depiction of Ilsfeld on Andreas Kieser's 1685 forestry map

In 1368 Ilsfeld became the property of Württemberg; by about 1460 it had become a fief of the Vogt or reeve of Lauffen am Neckar. It was a border territory; to the north, Talheim had become the property of the Teutonic Knights, and beyond that lay for example Flein, which belonged to the Imperial City of Heilbronn, Stettenfels Castle, property of the Electorate of the Palatinate, and the County of Löwenstein. In 1450, during Count Ulrich V's war against 30 Swabian Imperial Cities, Ilsfeld was attacked by Heilsbronn forces; the village was laid waste, with 40 people killed and 300 head of livestock removed.

In 1456 the Württembergischer Landgraben (Württemberg Ditch) was created as a border fortification running north of Ilsfeld, with a defensive tower, the Landturm, north of the hamlet of Wüstenhausen. In 1460 the Battle of Wüstenhausen took place there, with Duke Ulrich defeating the forces of Frederick the Victorious, Elector Palatine. The many battles in the 15th century are probably why Ilsfeld was surrounded by a high wall with ten towers.

Ilsfeld suffered greatly in the wars of the 16th and 17th centuries. In 1519, Duke William IV of Bavaria quartered his army there; during the Thirty Years' War there were outbreaks of plague in 1626 and 1634 and Imperial troops were quartered there in 1638/39; and in 1645 it was plundered by French, Hessian and Weimar troops. During the war the population shrank from about 1,200 to barely 100, and years after the war ended, many fields and vineyards were still abandoned. Despite a large number of settlers from Austria and Switzerland, it took approximately a century for the settlement to recover. During that time there were further quarterings of troops and required contributions. Between 1672 and 1675, Brandenburg troops were several times quartered in Ilsfeld. In 1693, during the War of the Palatine Succession, French troops used it as a base to attack Heilbronn.

=== Rural district of Württemberg ===
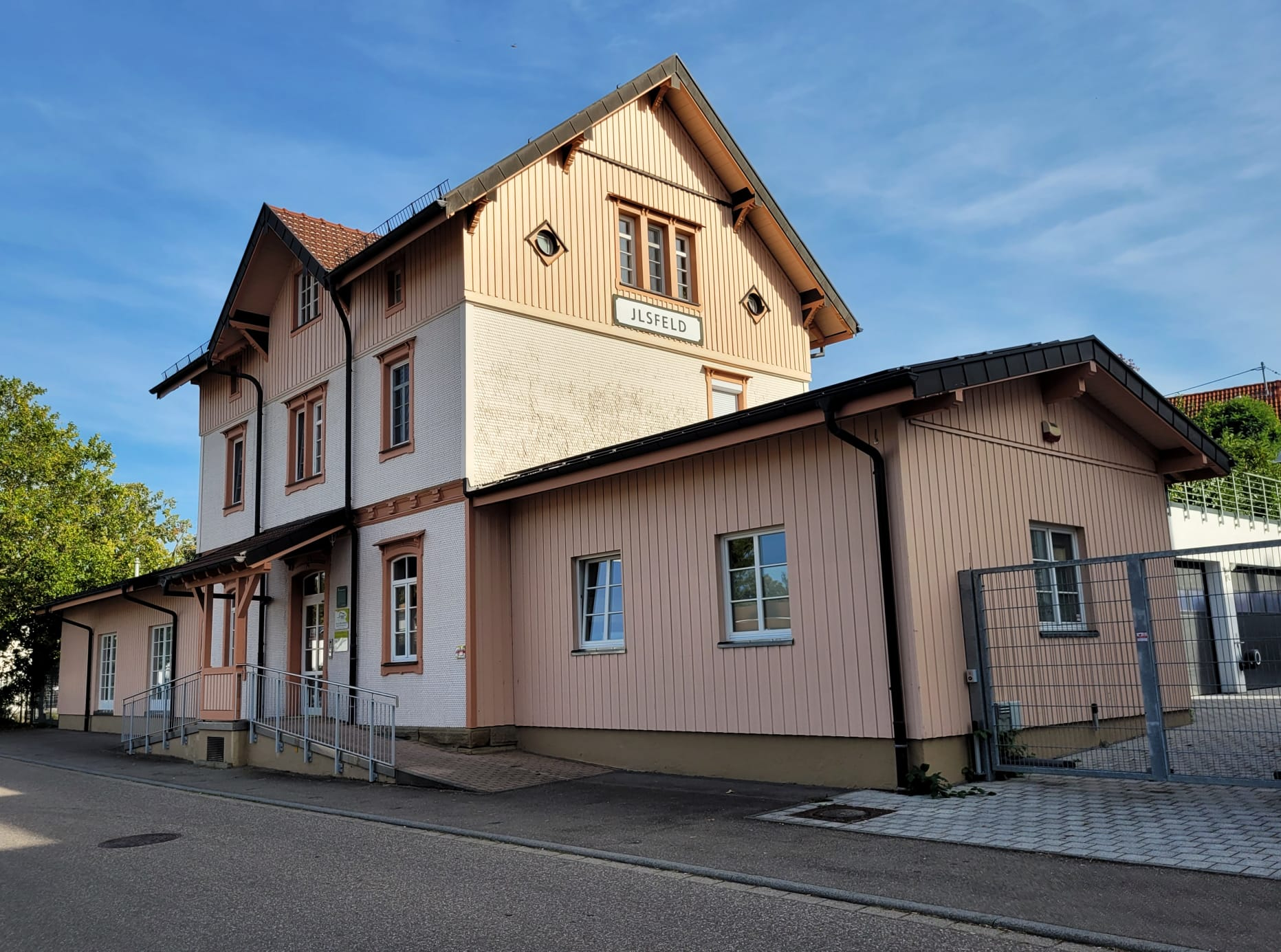
Former station, photographed in 2023

In the 18th century, there was again peace and modest growth in Ilsfeld. After the Napoleonic Wars, following which the entire surrounding area became Württemberg territory, and after a territorial reorganization of the Duchy, Ilsfeld belonged to the Oberamt of Bietigheim beginning in 1808, and then to the Oberamt of Besigheim beginning in 1810. The settlement slowly grew beyond its medieval borders, first west and east along the main street. By 1832, the town gates no longer existed. In 1844, for the first time, the number of inhabitants officially exceeded 2,000. However, poverty was ever-present until well into the 19th century. There were famines in 1816, 1831 and 1841, and between 1810 and 1890, 651 residents emigrated, mostly to America but also to Africa (the Cape Colony) and Russia (the Caucasus).

Between 1889 and 1891, a road was built connecting Ilsfeld to the administrative center of Besigheim, and in November 1899 a segment of the Bottwar Valley Railway was inaugurated; the following year, this was extended from Ilsfeld to Heilbronn South. The Royal Württemberg State Railways built the station at Ilsfeld as a unified station of Type IIIa. The railroad caused Ilsfeld to develop in the early 20th century from a purely rural settlement to a bedroom community for Heilbronn, where more than 200 residents were soon working, mostly in factories such as the Ackermann plying mill, the Knorr soup factory, the Bruckmann silverware factory and the Flammer soap factory. After an electricity generating plant was built in Pleidelsheim around 1907, Ilsfeld was electrified by 1914.

=== 1904 fire ===
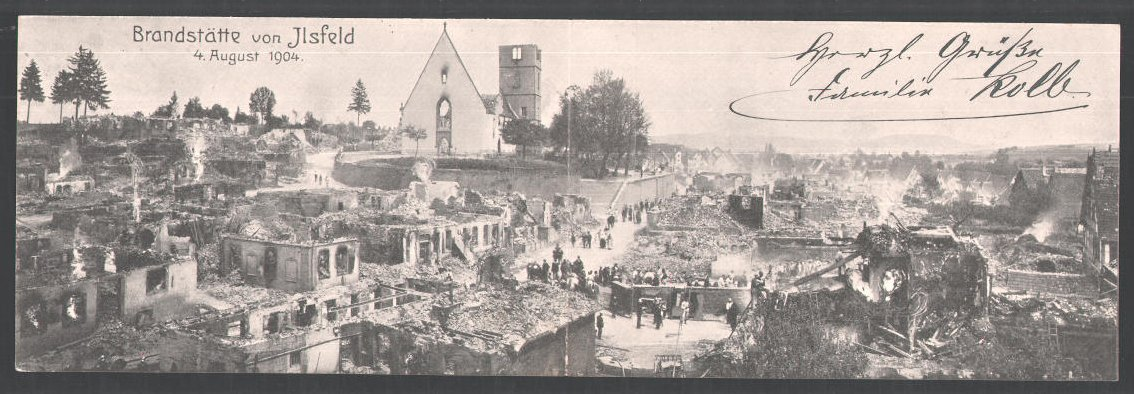
Aftermath of 1904 fire

On August 4, 1904, approximately 420 square decametres (10 acres) of the town burned; 130 buildings were destroyed, including the town hall, the school, the church and 77 barns. One person was killed and 706 left homeless. The losses were assessed at 1,392,696 Reichsmarks. The fire was caused by a portable stove that children were using to bake apples and that tipped over. Firefighting efforts were considerably hindered by the different hose couplings used by Württemberg firefighting units. The fire shocked the whole of Germany; during the following days King William II visited the town, as did more than 40,000 of the curious.

By August 8, the Württemberg Ministerial Division of Road and Water Construction had organized a rebuilding committee led by Oberbaurat Richard Leibbrand, which began by erecting a temporary barracks encampment to house the homeless over the winter. A new town plan was then drawn up: when the town was rebuilt, the main street (still the center of the town and called König-Wilhelm-Straße since 1906) was widened by 11 metres (36 ft) by not rebuilding on the slope leading up to the church and instead supporting the hillside with a retaining wall, the Planmauer, which was extended by about 100 metres (330 ft). The major public buildings (town hall, church, school, teacher's and minister's residences, and the Dorastift kindergarten) were designed by the architects Paul Schmohl and Georg Stähelin in a traditional Swabian style with Jugendstil elements. By 1906, rebuilding was largely complete.

Ilsfeld remained primarily rural in character until World War II; industry failed to gain a foothold, primarily because of a lack of infrastructure. In 1935 there were 335 agricultural concerns, mainly smallholdings, employing 40–60% of the residents, and 120 small businesses with a total of 220 employees. A planned post bus connection to Lauffen am Neckar, which would have enabled residents to work at the cement works, failed to materialize in 1929.

=== Third Reich ===
Hugo Heinrich, elected Schultheiß in 1916 (his title became Bürgermeister, mayor, in 1932) became a member of the Nazi Party in 1934 and remained in office throughout the Third Reich; he petitioned to retire for reasons of ill health in 1937 but was unable to obtain the necessary medical certification. From 1939 on, he was also mayor of Schozach under a joint arrangement.

Construction began in 1935 on the Reichsautobahn segment between Heilbronn and Stuttgart, now Bundesautobahn 81, which passes through the southeastern part of Ilsfeld. When the Oberamt of Besigheim was dissolved in 1938, unlike most other localities within it, Ilsfeld became part of the district of Heilbronn.

During the war, Ilsfeld was at first largely spared by air raids, although surrounding localities were heavily affected beginning in 1941. After Heilbronn was bombed on December 4, 1944, approximately 600 people fled to Ilsfeld, which was already full of refugees and expellees. In the final days of the war, on April 14 and 16, 1945, Ilsfeld itself became a bombing target; about 50 buildings were destroyed and several people were killed. The town was occupied by American troops on April 20. Refugees caused the number of inhabitants to swell from 1,999 in 1939 to 2,164 at the end of 1945.

=== Post-war ===
After Hugo Heinrich retired in 1947, two temporary mayors were appointed, followed in 1947/48 by Gottlob Frank, who had previously acted as the mayor's deputy. In 1948 Eugen Härle was elected to the position; he served until 1974, from 1954 to 1972, when it was annexed by Ilsfeld, once again also as mayor of Schozach.

The autobahn was not returned to service until 1950. At first Ilsfeld only had one-way access for military vehicles; in 1956 an exit was built, and in 1968–74, two rest stops. The railroad was closed in 1967; together with the proximity of the autobahn exit, this meant increasing traffic problems in the villages of Ilsfeld and Auenstein. Auenstein was helped with a bypass in the 1990s.

In 1950, what is now the town of Ilsfeld had 571 farms employing 1,151 people, and 217 commercial businesses employing 448. Since the 1950s, an influx of business and industry has caused considerable development in the area, with processing soon replacing agriculture as the primary source of employment. The business district of Ilsfeld proper extends from the center of the town east to the autobahn exit, and starting with the 1952 Kernersiedlung, large new residential developments have appeared to the east, north, and south. The other centers within the town have also experienced both residential and commercial development. In 1987, there were 58 farms employing 203 people, and 332 commercial businesses employing 2,029. Numerous foreigners migrated to the area to work beginning in the early 1960s; in 1987, of approximately 6,200 residents, about 550 were non-Germans.

In February 1970, a large section of the Planmauer collapsed; renovation lasted until 1974, and plans were made at the same time for renewal of the now aged village centre, which was carried out in the 1980s. This involved demolition and replacement of numerous old residential buildings that had survived the 1904 fire and restoration of buildings erected after the fire.

=== Annexations ===
Ilsfeld annexed Schozach on July 1, 1971. On December 31, 1973, Ilsfeld and Auenstein (including Abstetterhof and Helfenberg) were combined to form the new town of Ilsfeld.

== Governance ==
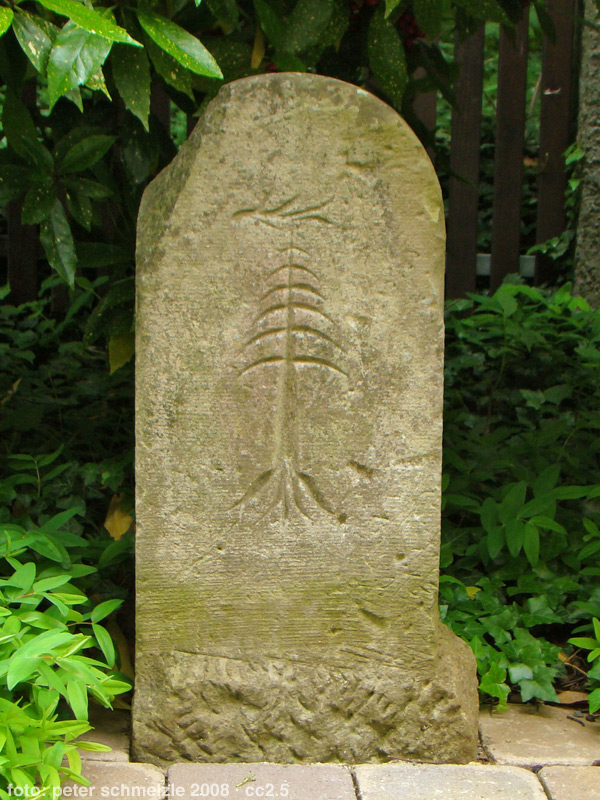
Historical boundary marker with Ilsfeld stag's antler and tree

=== Town council ===
In an election on June 7, 2009, the town council was reduced from 22 to 20 seats. The mayor is also a member and presides.

=== Coat of arms ===
The blazon of the coat of arms of Ilsfeld is: On a field of silver, a black stag's antler (the Württemberg heraldic emblem) over a rooted green tree. The town flag is green and white.

The tree is the ancient symbol of Ilsfeld, appearing on boundary markers since at least 1685. The stag's antler is the heraldic symbol of Württemberg. Official seals of Ilsfeld have combined the two since 1468 (the oldest known village seal and arms in Württemberg). The antler was originally to the right of the tree; the current arrangement was adopted in 1596. The colors are attested since the late 16th century. The arms were adopted by the unified town after the annexation of Auenstein, and were officially granted by the District of Heilbronn on January 24, 1978.

=== Twinning ===
- Ottery St Mary, United Kingdom (since 2003)
- Auenstein, Switzerland
- Moşna, Romania

== Annual market ==
The annual Ilsfelder Holzmarkt market was described as an ancient tradition in 1521. It takes place on the last weekend in August; in the 1970s it developed into a peddlers' market with a fun fair and events marquee.

== Transportation ==
Ilsfeld has an exit on Bundesautobahn 81 (Würzburg – Stuttgart).

Since March 1, 2008, with increased restrictions beginning January 1, 2012, Ilsfeld proper restricts traffic to non-polluting vehicles.

== Notable people ==
=== Honorary citizens ===
In 1906 the philologist Karl Vollmöller was one of several people the community council made honorary citizens for their help in rebuilding after the 1904 fire.

=== Other notable people with connection to Ilsfeld ===
- Adolf Würth, entrepreneur, born in Ilsfeld. Würth founded what today is known as Würth group. He is the father of Reinhold Würth, who frequently visited his grandparents in Ilsfeld as a child.
- Lothar Späth, politician (CDU), raised in Ilsfeld
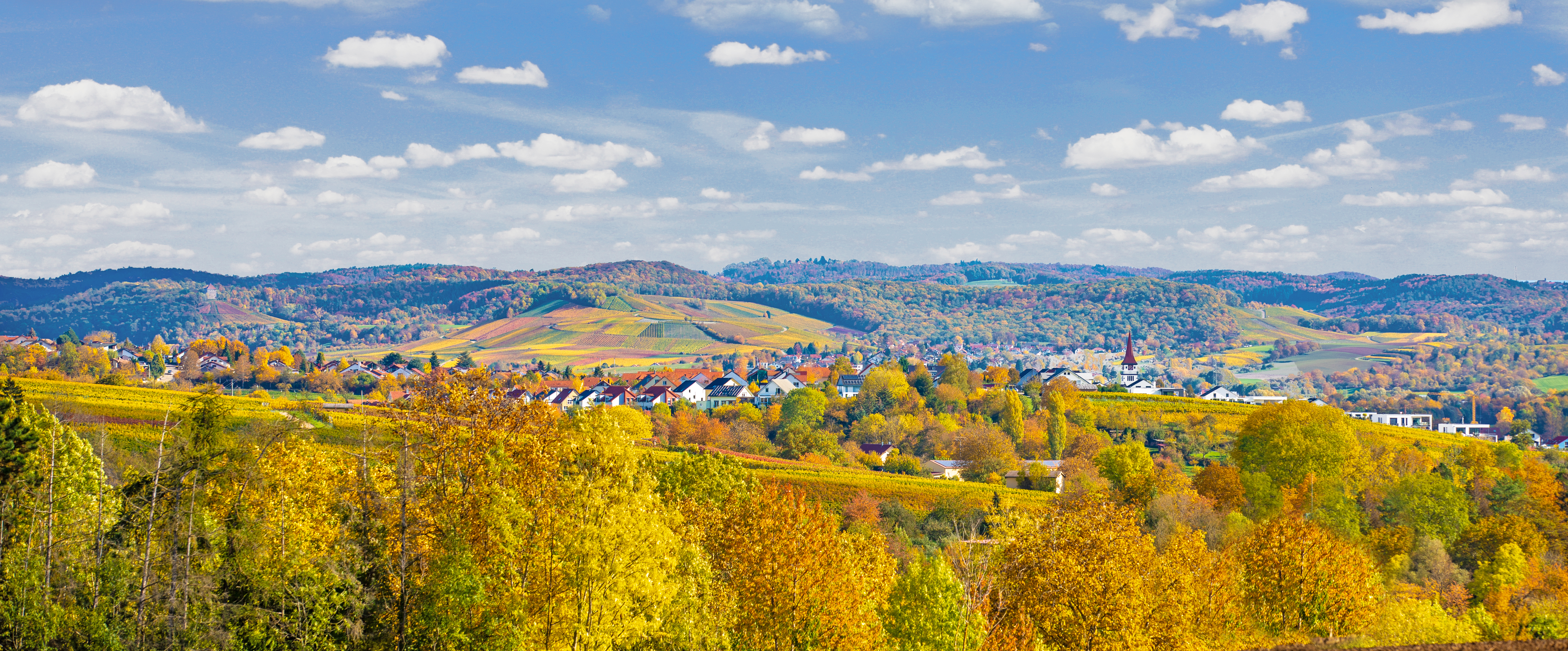
2020 panorama of Ilsfeld
