= Beilstein, Württemberg =

Beilstein
- Town
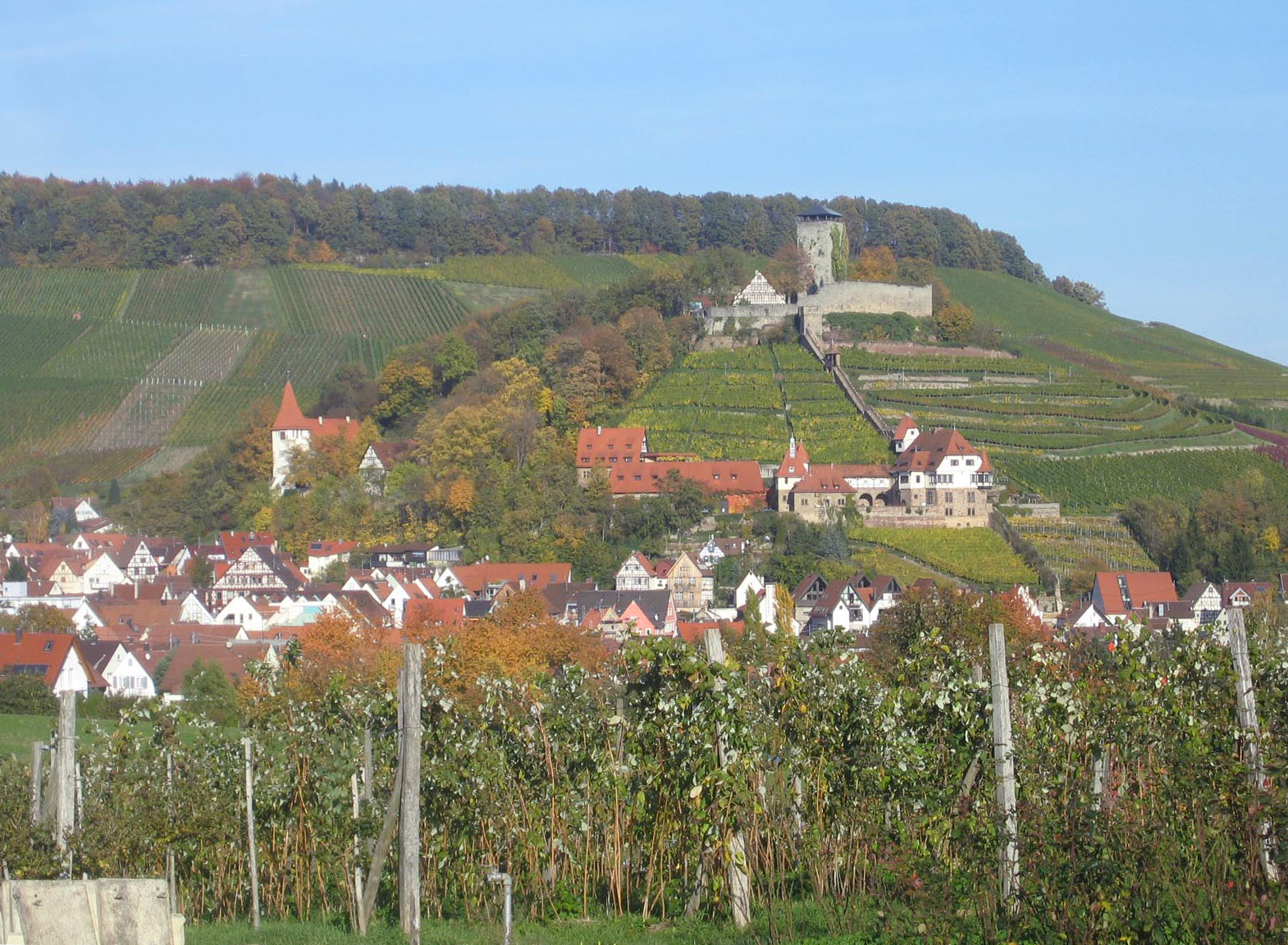
- Hohenbeilstein castle

- Coat of arms

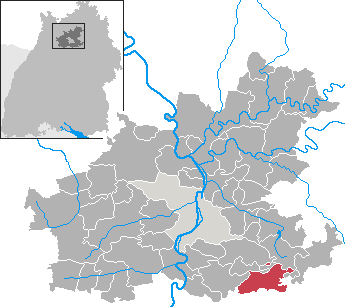
- Location of Beilstein within Heilbronn district
- Interactive map of Beilstein
- Location within Germany Location within Baden-Württemberg
- Coordinates: 49°2′N 9°19′E
- Country: Germany
- State: Baden-Württemberg
- Admin. region: Stuttgart
- District: Heilbronn
- Municipal assoc.: Schozach-Bottwartal
- Subdivisions: 12 quarters

Government
  - Mayor (2021–29): Barbara Schoenfeld

Area
  - Total: 25.24 km^{2} (9.75 sq mi)
- Elevation: 257 m (843 ft)

Population (2025-12-31)
  - Total: 6,326
  - Density: 250.6/km^{2} (649.1/sq mi)
- Time zone: UTC+01:00 (CET)
  - Summer (DST): UTC+02:00 (CEST)
- Postal codes: 71717, 71543
- Dialling codes: 07062
- Vehicle registration: HN
- Website: www.beilstein.de

Beilstein (German pronunciation: [ˈbaɪlʃtaɪn]) is a town in the district of Heilbronn in Baden-Württemberg in southern Germany. It is 14 kilometres (9 mi) southeast of Heilbronn. Beilstein is on the Württemberg wine route (Württemberger Weinstraße).

== Geography ==
Beilstein lies in the south of the district of Heilbronn. The town is crossed by the Söhlbach, a tributary of the Bottwar. The communal land of Beilstein includes big parts of the Löwenstein Mountains. Annasee Lake is nearby.

=== Neighbouring municipalities ===
Neighbouring towns and municipalities of Beilstein are (clockwise from the south): Oberstenfeld, Großbottwar (both in the district of Ludwigsburg), Ilsfeld, Abstatt, Lauffen am Neckar (exclave Etzlenswenden), Löwenstein (all in the district of Heilbronn) and Spiegelberg (Rems-Murr-Kreis). The village Farnersberg is an exclave between Untergruppenbach in the north and Lauffen's exclave Stadtwald Etzlenswenden in the south. Beilstein has combined with Abstatt, Ilsfeld and Untergruppenbach to form a joint association of administrations called Schozach-Bottwartal.

=== Town structure ===
Apart from the town itself Beilstein consists of the villages Hohenbeilstein and Schmidhausen. The hamlets Etzlenswenden, Farnersberg and Stocksberg also belong to Beilstein. The neighbouring hill Stocksberg is the highest one of the Löwenstein Mountains, however, it doesn't belong to the communal land of Beilstein. There are also the hamlets Söhlbach, Obere Öhlmühle, Steinberg and Untere Ölmühle. The hamlets Billensbach, Gagernberg, Jettenbach, Kaisersbach, Klingen and Maad belong to Schmidhausen.

== History ==
=== Foundation in Middle Ages ===
Beilstein developed during the Middle Ages adjacent to Hohenbeilstein Castle, which was built around 1080. After overlordship of the castle passed to the Margraves of Baden in 1234, the settlement was promoted to town status between 1250 and 1288 and is first mentioned as such in 1304. Since then it has changed overlordship several times. Ulrich IV and Eberhard II gave the town to emperor Charles IV, who returned it as a fief. Thereafter until the 18th century, the fief reverted to the next emperor or count before any assumption of office.

Beilstein was also an office and residential town of the Vogt. In the 14th century it was walled. The Reformation came to the town around 1534–35 and a Latin school was founded there in 1540.

=== Thirty Years' War ===
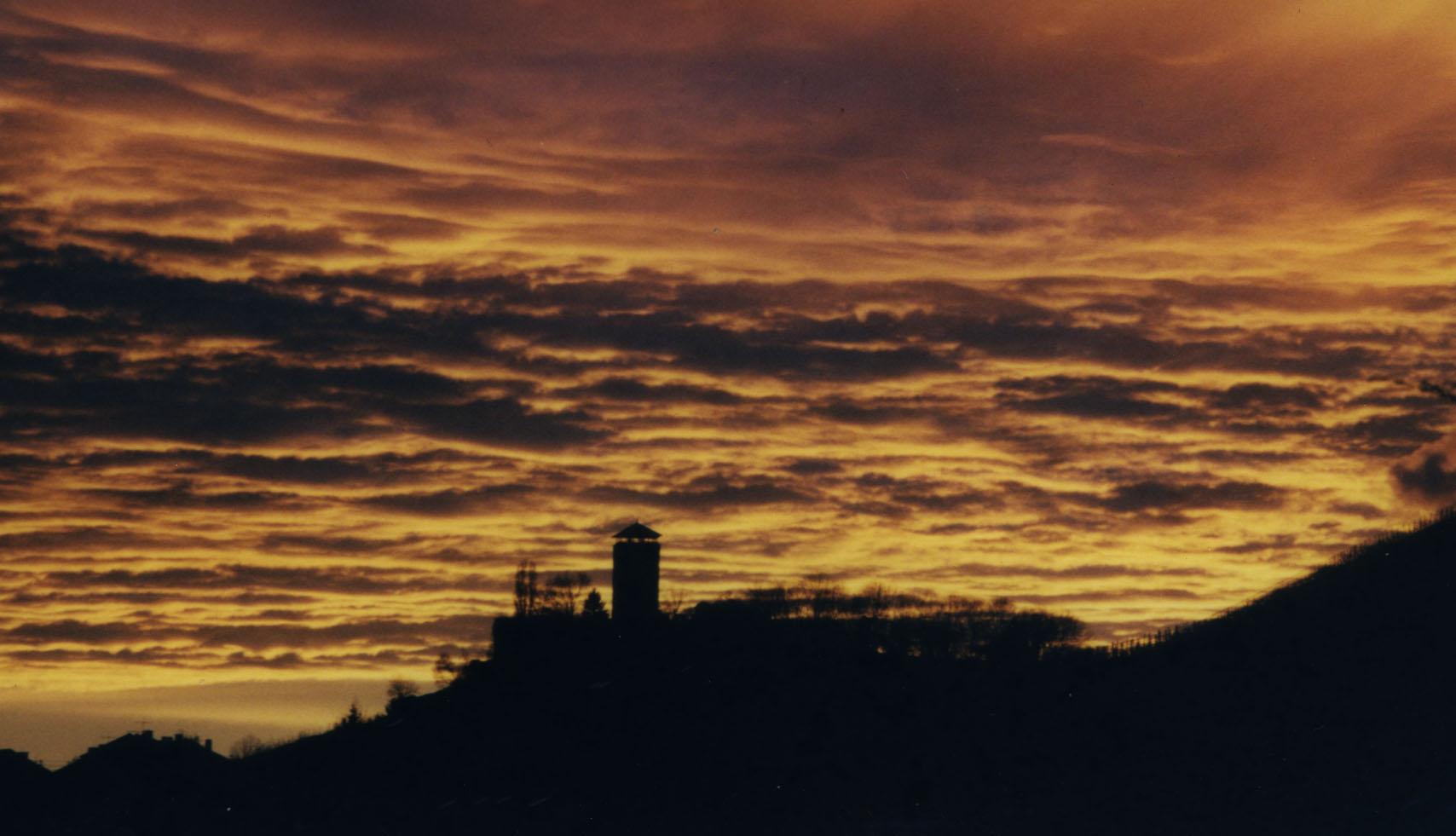
Hohenbeilstein Castle in the evening

Thirty Years' War held between Catholics and Protestants claimed many victims by acts of war, epidemics and famines. In 1622, the Battle of Wimpfen was fought near Beilstein.

First complaints occurred when soldiers were quartered with the town in 1623. Many horses were stolen. Bavarian soldiers occupied trade routes to Heilbronn and Schwäbisch Hall, so there was no possibility to buy grain when there was a huge crop failure. In 1628 there were further losses due to the invasion of Wallenstein's troops, demanding 65 bushels of grain in 1629.

The Battle of Nördlingen led to much disease. Eberhard III fled to Straßburg, so victorious imperial troops looted and burned down many towns and villages. Further rise in prices, hunger and epidemics resulted. Nursing of the sick, monthly requisitions, the building of a soldiers' hospital and quartering of soldiers impoverished the population. The number of Beilstein's inhabitants decreased so far that there were just 39 houses habitable in 1641.

Finally the Peace of Westphalia of 1648 ended a quarter-century of suffering. People were able to rebuild their villages, fields, and vineyards. The number of habitable houses increased from 39 in 1641 to 117 in 1655.

=== Nine Years' War ===
During Nine Years' War there were several invasions by French troops after 1688. Once the French were able to advance to Lauffen, where Württemberg's troops beat them and forced them back. During the second invasion the French destroyed Marbach and advanced to Großbottwar, Oberstenfeld, Beilstein and Auenstein. Beilstein was burned down almost completely: 105 houses, 30 barns, and the town hall were destroyed. During the next three decades the town was rebuilt according to plans of architect Matthias Weiß of 1693.

=== Beilstein in the 19th century ===
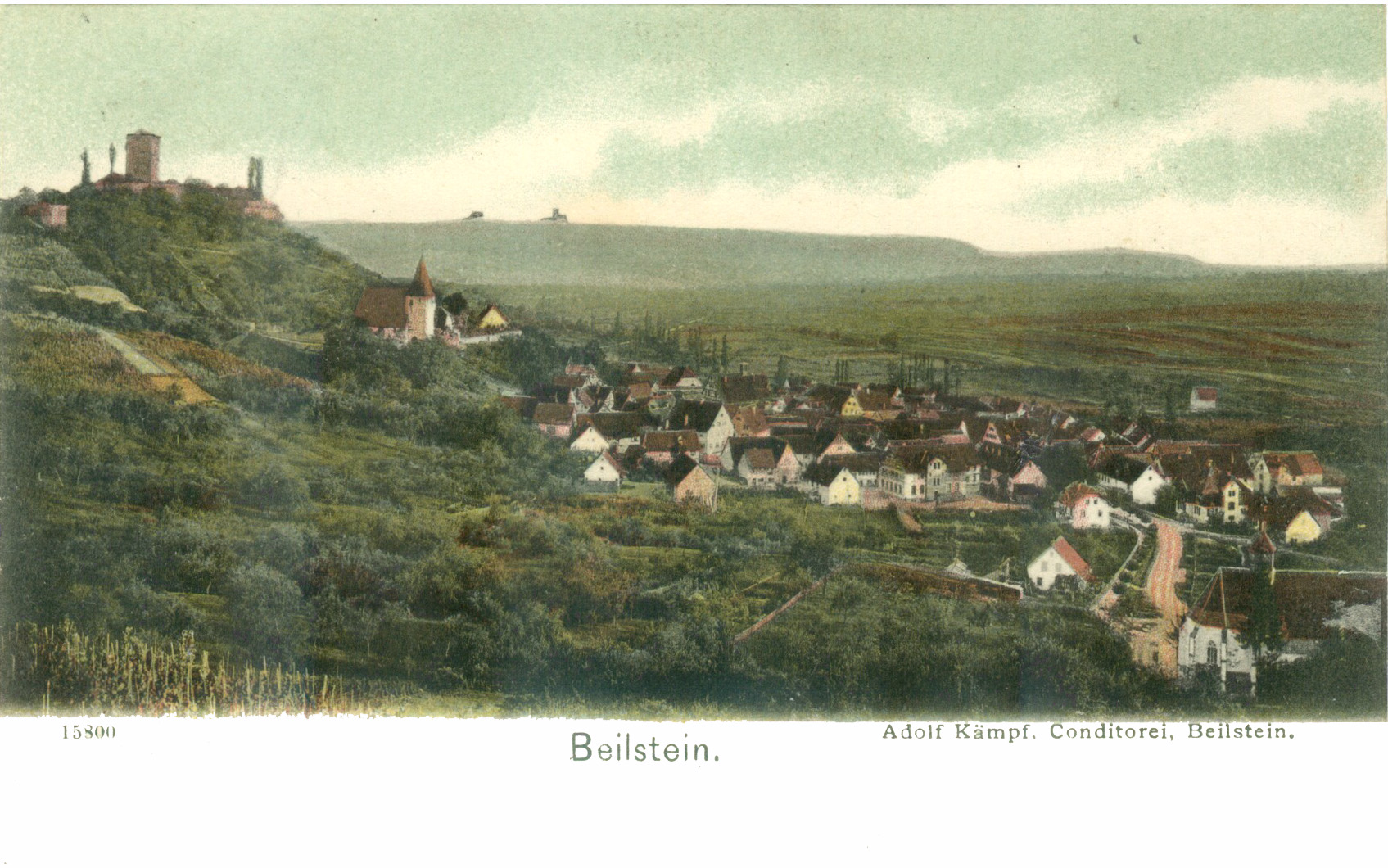
view from east around 1900

According to a reorganization of Württemberg's departments Beilstein was seat of Oberamt Beilstein between 1803 and 1806. However, four years later it was merged with the Oberamt Marbach. This became part of the district of Heilbronn in 1938. Around 1840 the town began to knock down its town gates and to expand. Further poverty led to a decrease of population. Many people moved to bigger towns or emigrated. Between 1851 and 1860 67 people emigrated.

The Bottwartalbahn opened gradually between 1894 and 1900 and led to a certain upswing to villages along the railroad. However, settlement of industry stayed backward. In 1907–08 a public water supply was installed. In 1911 a connection to the power station of Pleidelsheim and Beihingen took place.

=== Time of national socialism ===
As everywhere the Gleichschaltung took place in Beilstein 1933. Since no Jews lived in the town, no antisemitic actions occurred. From 1933 to 1937 different parts of the Wehrmacht were stationed here. On July 12, 1935, the first medical examination for military service took place. In August 1934 there was a decree to build air-raid shelters. After the outbreak of war in 1939 several prisoners of war were quartered in Beilstein.

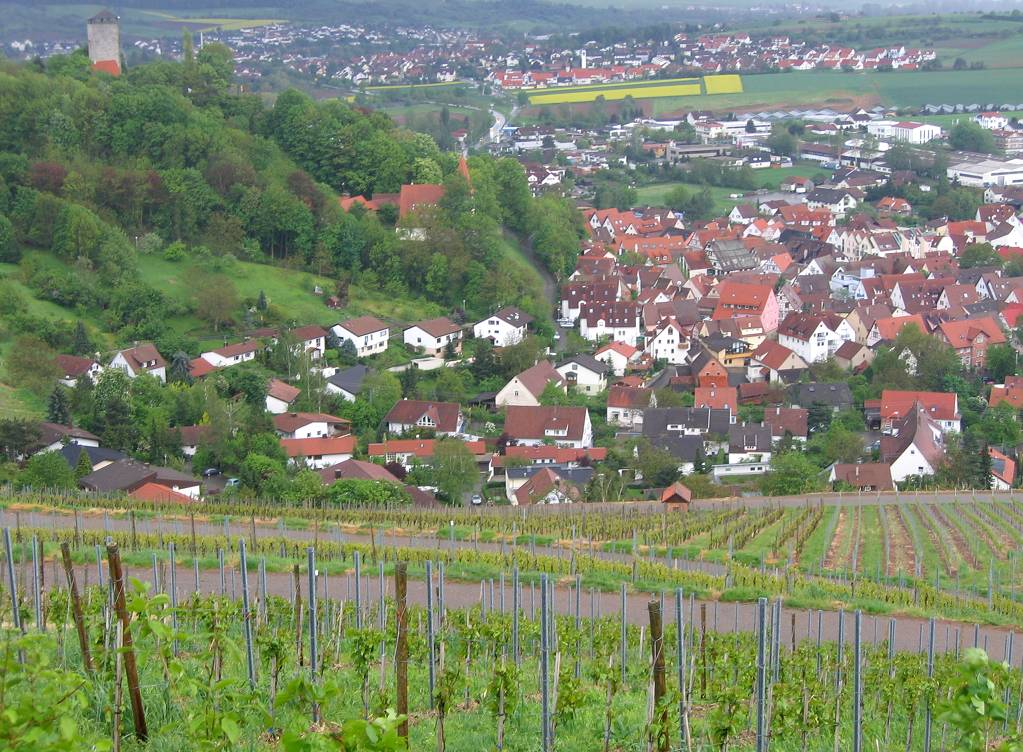
Beilstein and Hohenbeilstein Castle

Until 1944 Beilstein stayed nearly undamaged. There were just three attacks of fighter-bombers causing little damage of property. From February 1944 to April 1945 there were further six attacks causing three casualties and four damaged houses.

In March 1945 the front line came nearer, and army units entered the town, which became the target of a heavy air-raid in the afternoon of April 16, 1945. By this attack nearly 40% of the whole town was destroyed, so it was one of the most affected places of the region. The next night it was very difficult to extinguish all the fires. Primarily, the civilian population focused on saving their own houses, leaving the already strained fire brigade to focus on the rest of the town.

On April 16 there was still heavy resistance from the Germans. The Americans changed their plans and tried to take the town by encircling it. There were several casualties caused by these actions. The Germans had an advantage as they knew the area. In the morning of April 19, 1945, the first American tanks entered Beilstein, despite tank traps set up by the German forces. The Battle of Beilstein took the whole day; military action continued until 11 p.m.

=== Present ===
Repairing the damages of World War II took until 1955. Then new growth started in Beilstein. Between 1956 and 1971 new building sites containing around 280 houses were erected. On July 1, 1971, the municipality of Schmidhausen was incorporated into Beilstein.

After 1970 the population increased heavily as Beilstein became attractive to commuters driving to Heilbronn, Ludwigsburg and Stuttgart. Due to a state program of redevelopment, decisive actions were taken in 1982 to change the town's image.

== Politics ==
=== Local council ===
Elections May 2014:

- Freie Wählervereinigung Beilsteiner Bürgerinnen und Bürger, FW: 38,1 % – 7 Sitze (−1)
- CDU Bürgerliste Beilstein: 26,5 % – 5 Sitze (±0)
- SPD Bürgerliste: 14,2 % – 2 Sitze (±0)
- Initiative Beilstein: 12,0 % – 2 Sitze (+2)
- FDP: 9,2 % – 2 Sitze (−1)
- Total: 18 seats

The mayor is also a member of the district council and its chairman.

=== Mayors ===
- Since 2021: Barbara Schoenfeld
- 2012–2021: Patrick Holl
- 1987-2012: Günter Henzler

=== Arms and flag ===
Arms of Beilstein

Blazon: In red a hexagonal silver stone with three silver hatchets all around. The town colours are white and red.

Until the 17th century the seals of Beilstein showed just one hatchet being the Fleckenzeichen simultaneously. From 1579 to 1641 the empty surface around the hatchet was filled with roses. The canting arms have been used since 1583, but the colours changed several times. The district council of Beilstein confirmed the current form of arms on February 5, 1930.

=== Twin town ===
Since 1984 there is a relationship with Pontault-Combault in the French Département Seine-et-Marne.

== Culture and sights ==
=== Notable buildings ===
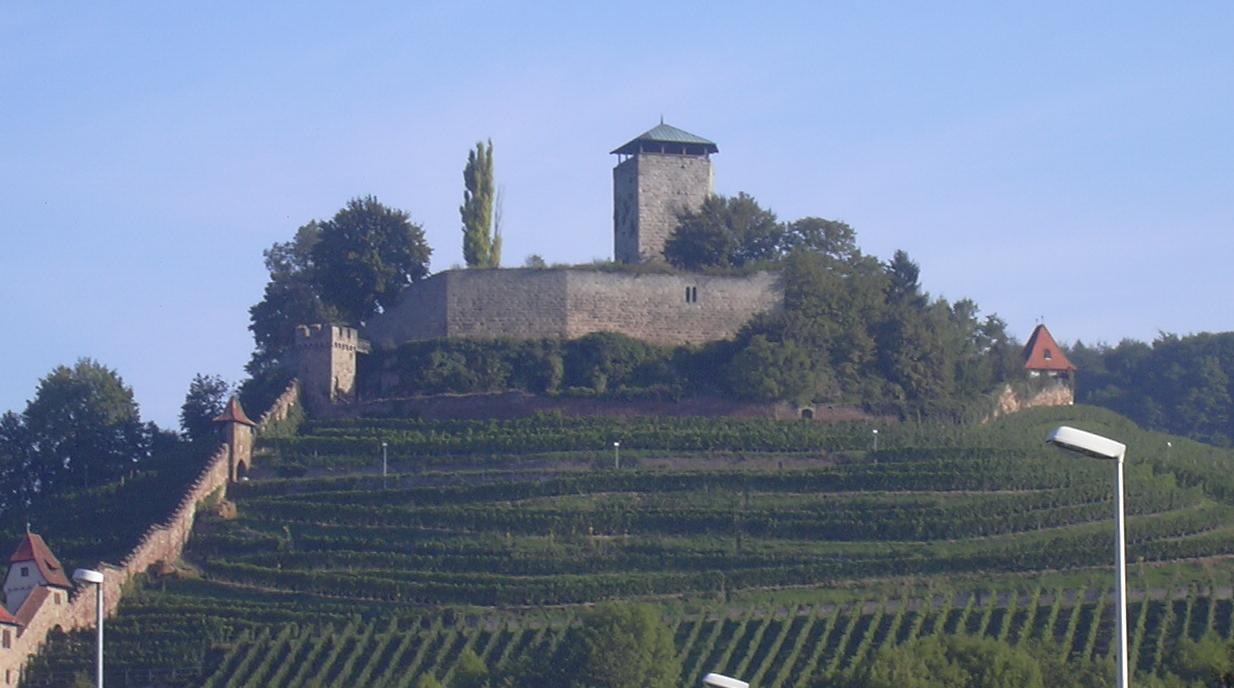
Hohenbeilstein Castle

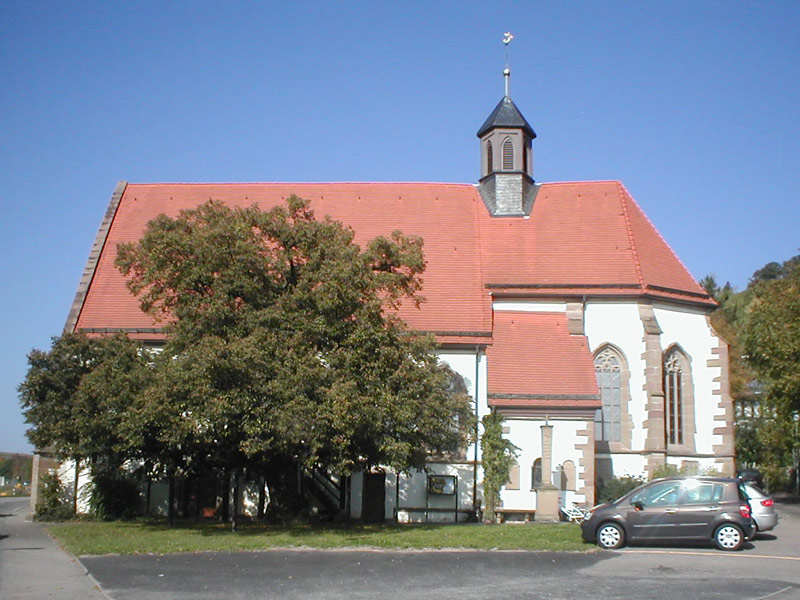
Anna-Kirche

Above Beilstein is Hohenbeilstein Castle, which was built in the 11th century but fell into ruin five centuries later. It was rebuilt in the 19th century and contains both a restaurant and a falconry today.

Halfway between castle and town is the Unteres Schloss (Lower Castle). It was built in 1907 by Robert Vollmoeller. The Unteres Schloss is the conference venue of the Evangelical-Lutheran Church in Württemberg since 1960.

The Church of the Magdalene was built in the Romanesque period. In 1805 its use as a church ended, and thereafter it served as a military hospital, ammunition dump, and a gym. Later it decayed. In 1850 the choir was torn down. In 1955 it was rebuilt as a youth hostel.

The town hall is a baroque timber building. After its destruction in 1693 it was rebuilt from 1703 to 1710. Even other timber buildings show the reconstruction of the town, e. g. the neighbouring Alte Schmiede (old smithy). Also a new Alte Kelter (old wine-press) was built in 1698 instead of an older one.

The Sankt-Anna-Kirche was presumably built in 1470 in place of an older church. It has been Beilstein's municipal church since 1800. It was completely redeveloped from 1988 to 1990.

Since 2004 a historical round tour invites to discover Beilstein and its environs. Within the other villages and hamlets there are further notable buildings.

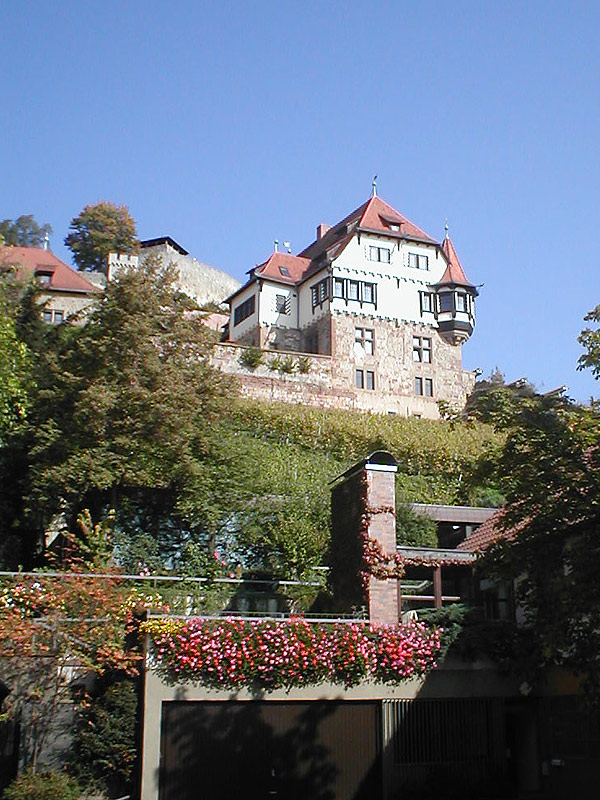
Unteres Schloss (lower castle)

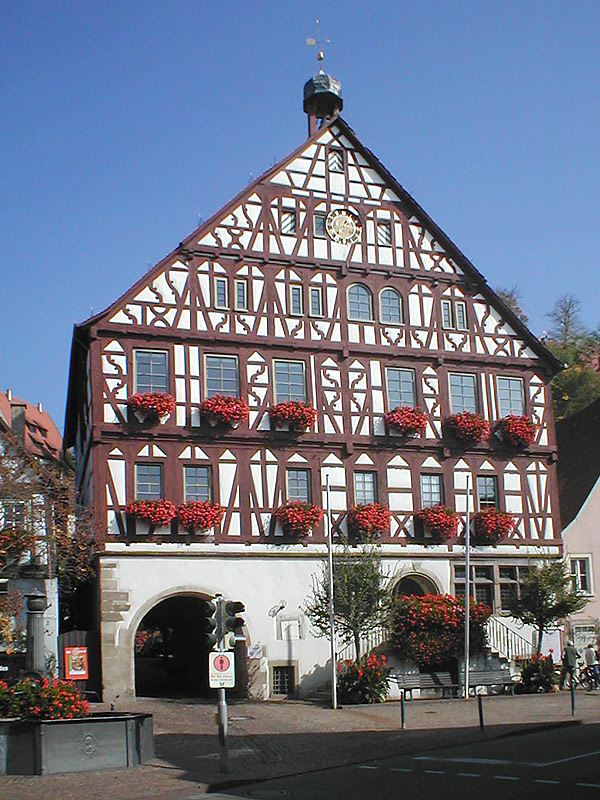
town hall

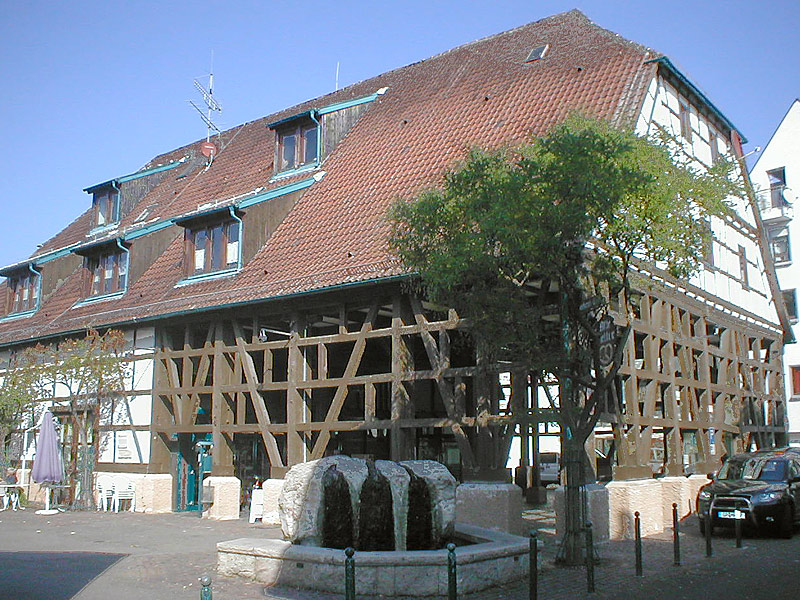
Alte Kelter (old wine-press)

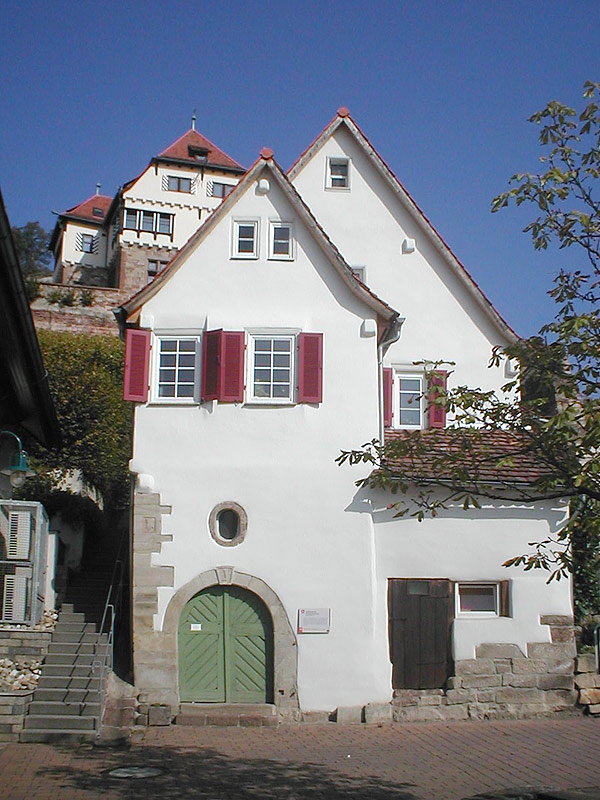
Handwerkerhaus

=== Sports and leisure ===
The DLRG Oberes Bottwartal offers education in swimming and lifesaving inside the mineral pool bath Oberes Bottwartal. The sports club TGV Eintracht Beilstein offers handball, football, swimming and other sports.

=== Regular events ===
In the Weinbergfest underneath Hohenbeilstein Castle taking place every last weekend in July there are shown Beilstein's sparklings and wines. Further celebrations are the Stadtfest and the Andreasmarkt. The Bottwartal-Marathon passes Beilstein.

== Economy and infrastructure ==
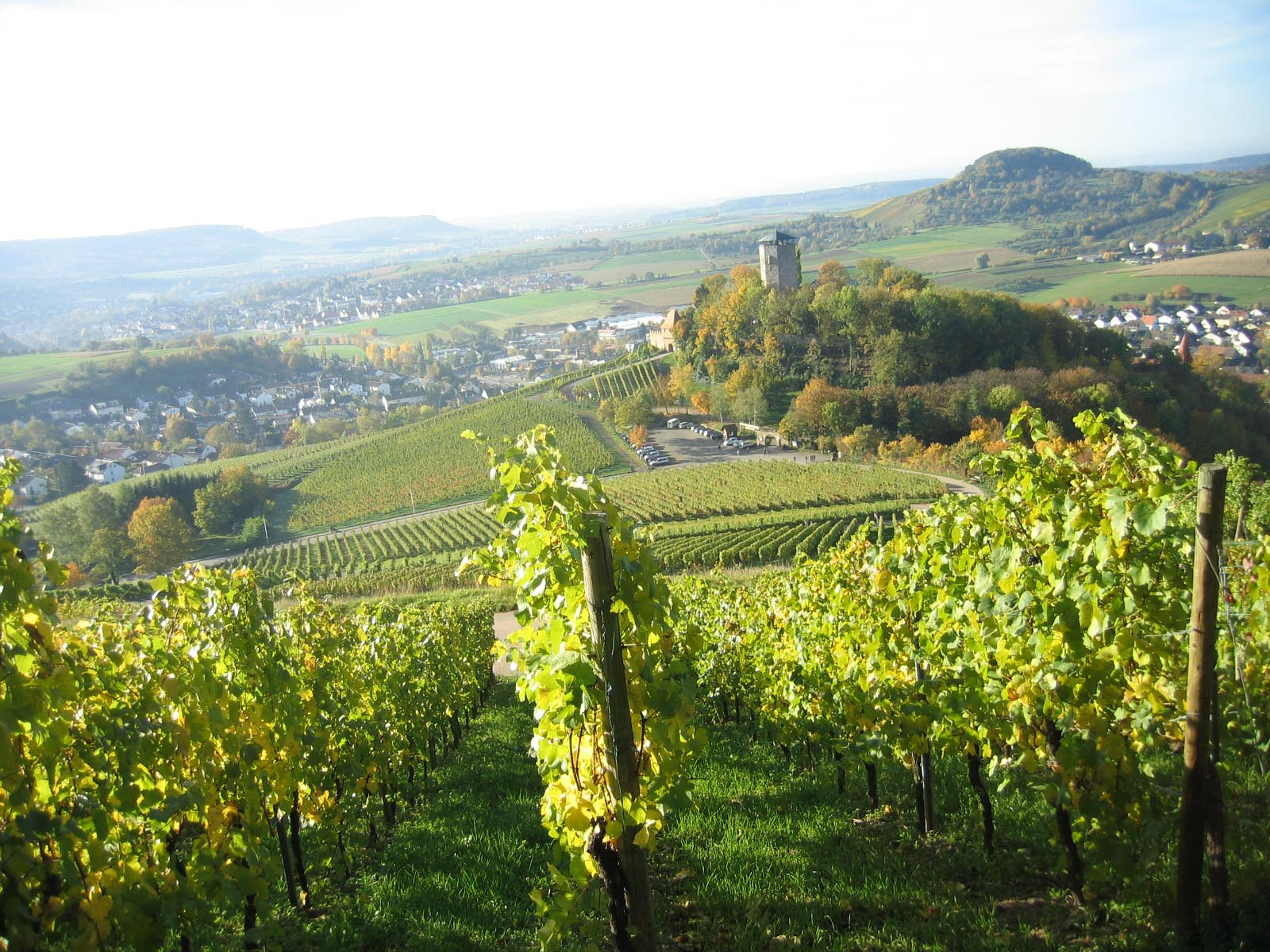
view to Beilstein and Hohenbeilstein

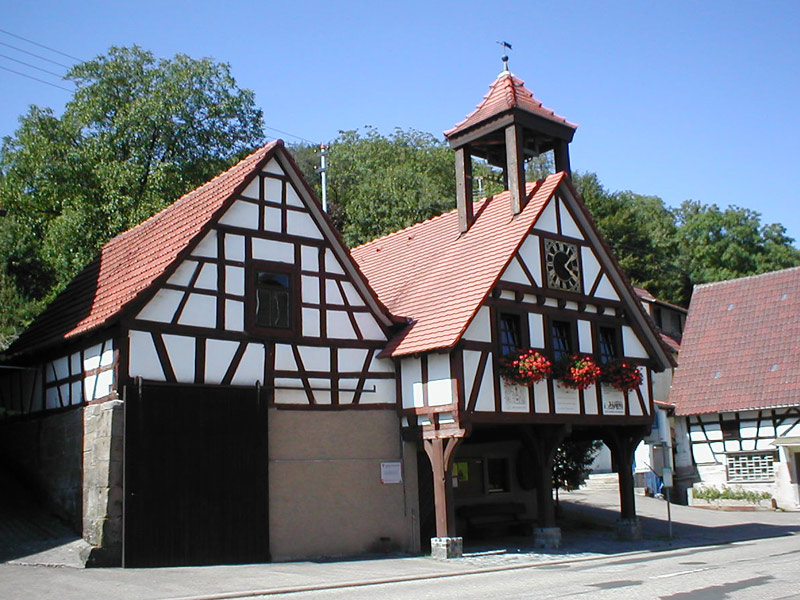
Kelterle in Etzlenswenden

=== Wine-growing ===
Beilstein is known nationwide for its wine. Especially Riesling, Trollinger and Lemberger grow here. By the Rebflurbereinigung all vineyards have been reorganized from 1966 to 1980. The yards belong to the wine region of Württemberg. Until recently wine-growing has been the main source of income.

=== Traffic ===
Beilstein is a station of the Bottwartalbahn running from Marbach am Neckar to Heilbronn. This rail road was laid up in 1968. Today public transport is ensured by buses of VVS and H3NV.

=== Media ===
For happenings in Beilstein, the newspaper Heilbronner Stimme is published daily. Otherwise, there is a newspaper named Marbacher Zeitung/Bottwartalbote (part of the Stuttgarter Nachrichten). Every Friday the town's office paper is published.

=== Public institutions ===
- The spa of Beilstein contains a 25-metre pool, children's area and sauna. It is open from September until May.
- The spa Oberes Bottwartal runs in cooperation with Oberstenfeld and is open from May until September. There are more than 1,000 parking spaces at its disposal.

=== Education ===
There are many local schools such as; a primary school and Hauptschule including Werkrealschule called Langhansschule named after the Bergfried of Hohenbeilstein Castle. There's also the Herzog-Christoph-Gymnasium. Beilstein also contains its own folk high school.

== Notable residents ==
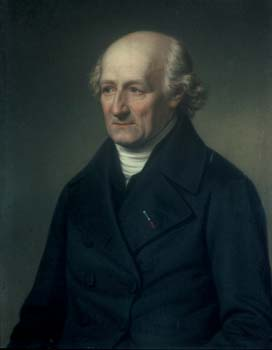
Friedrich Immanuel Niethammer

- Paul Hocheisen (1870–1944), military surgeon and SA general
- Franz Joseph Damian Junghanns (1800–1875), leader in the Baden Revolution of 1848
- Immanuel Niethammer (1766–1848), Bavarian Supreme Court and Oberkirchen Council
- Hans Purrmann (1880–1966), painter, lived in Beilstein from 1914 to 1916
- Valentin Vannius (1495–15670, Reformation pastor, First Reformed Abbot of Maulbronn Monastery, Author, Pastor of Cannstatt. Wrote several works published by the Duke of Württemberg.

== Literature and sources ==
Bibliography

- Otto Rohn und Dietmar Rupp (Hrsg.): Beilstein in Geschichte und Gegenwart. Stadt Beilstein, Beilstein 1983
