= Untergruppenbach =

- Municipality
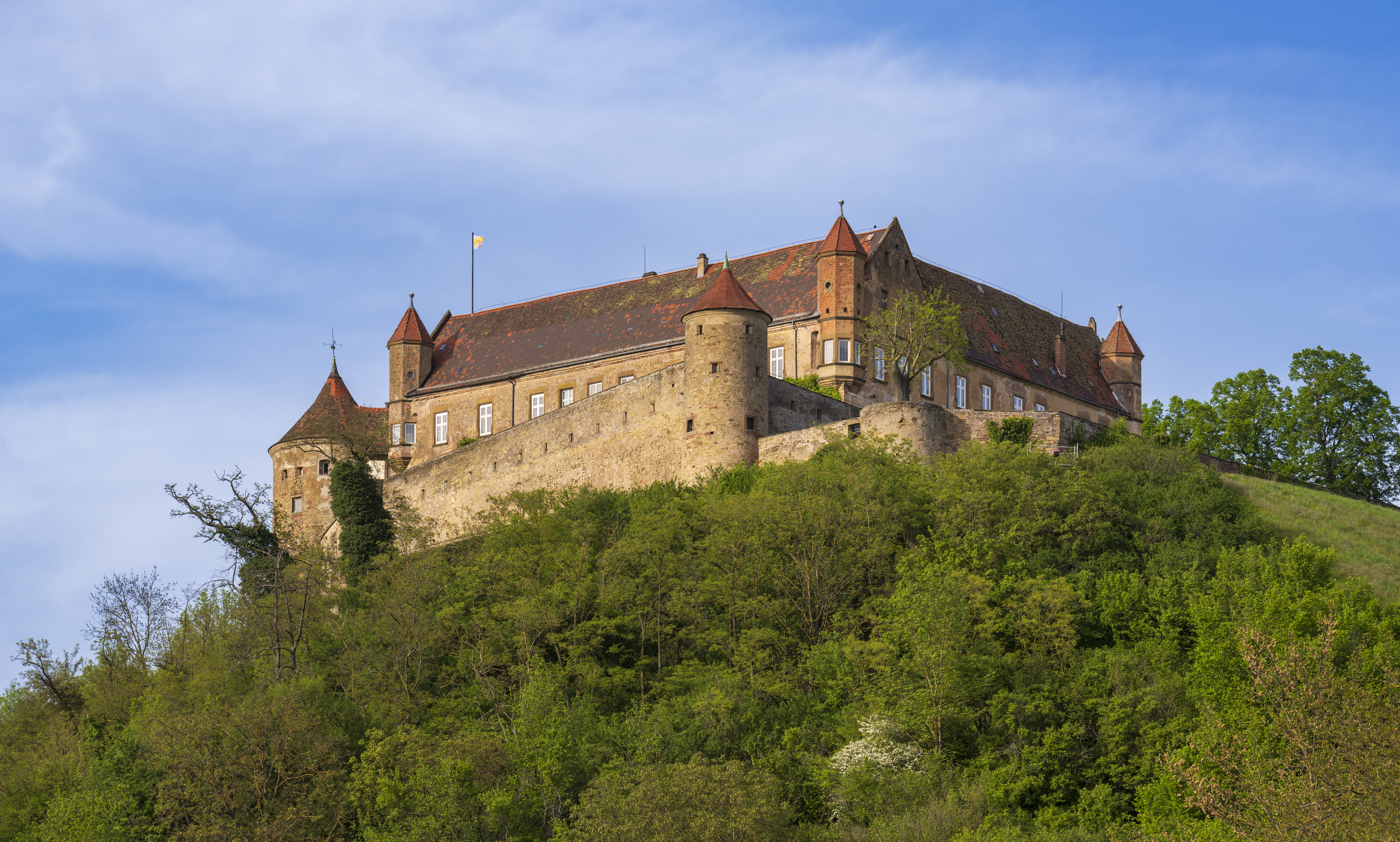
- Stettenfels castle

- Coat of arms

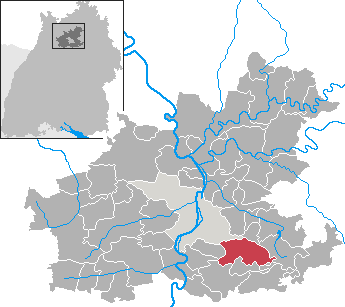
- Location of Untergruppenbach within Heilbronn district
- Interactive map of Untergruppenbach
- Location within Germany Location within Baden-Württemberg
- Coordinates: 49°5′N 9°16′E
- Country: Germany
- State: Baden-Württemberg
- Admin. region: Stuttgart
- District: Heilbronn
- Municipal assoc.: Schozach-Bottwartal
- Subdivisions: 6

Government
  - Mayor (2018–26): Andreas Vierling

Area
  - Total: 27.27 km^{2} (10.53 sq mi)
- Elevation: 276 m (906 ft)

Population (2025-12-31)
  - Total: 8,798
  - Density: 322.6/km^{2} (835.6/sq mi)
- Time zone: UTC+01:00 (CET)
  - Summer (DST): UTC+02:00 (CEST)
- Postal codes: 74199
- Dialling codes: 07131
- Vehicle registration: HN
- Website: www.untergruppenbach.de

Untergruppenbach (German: [ʊntɐˈɡʁʊpm̩bax]) is a municipality near Heilbronn, a city in the northern half of the German state of Baden-Württemberg.

There are a total of 7,600 inhabitants living in six villages that form the municipality of Untergruppenbach. Approximately 5,100 live in Untergruppenbach, Donnbronn and Obergruppenbach. An additional 2,500 live in Unterheinriet, Oberheinriet and Vorhof.

Untergruppenbach's name roughly means "below the 'Groppe' (a sort of small fish) stream", referring to a small stream that cuts across the valley in which Untergruppenbach and Obergruppenbach are located. The village is distinguished by Burg Stettenfels, a 16th-century castle/manor that stands out above the valley, from its lofty position atop a hill.

== History ==
Untergruppenbach is first mentioned in the Monastery of Hirsau, where reference is made to a village settled by the Franconians in the 6th century. It was later named after a small fish, the Groppe or Koppe, which is mentioned as being present in a stream near the settlement. After some 700 years of independent rule, the village was sold to Ludwig II, Duke of Bavaria, from whence the orb in the village's coat of arms probably originates.

In 1356 Burg Stettenfels is first mentioned. After a series of wars, in 1504 the castle came into the possession of the Dukes of Württemberg. Some years later it was sold to Wolff Philipp of Huernheim, who restored it. In 1551 the famous renaissance merchant-banker Fugger family, of Augsburg, came to own the castle. It is under Count Fugger that the castle received its current appearance.

Although the area was unaffected by the Thirty Years' War, during which it was an area under Catholic rule, the plague year of 1635 seriously affected the population, with a significant death toll. In the following decades there were tensions between the inhabitants of the village, who were predominantly Protestant, and the village lords, who were Catholic. When Count Xavier Fugger attempted to build a Catholic church and a Capuchin monastery in 1735 the Duke of Wurttemberg intervened and sent troops to destroy the buildings. The tensions continued and apparently reached a breaking point in 1737, when there was a conflict between the villagers and the castle lord, which ended with violence and the death of two men, with several wounded. The Count fled with his son, and in the proceedings that followed they eventually sold their title to the castle to Duke Karl Eugen, and the village came under the jurisdiction of the Duchy of Wurttemberg.

From the 17th century up to World War II the population of the municipality hardly changed, maintaining an average of 1,300. Only during the twentieth century did an immigration wave cause notable changes. The structure of the village has changed significantly. Up until the end of the 19th century the inhabitants were mainly farm workers or involved in craft making. In the late 1800s, with better roads, some of the inhabitants began to work in the quarries and factories of the nearby city of Heilbronn, at one point one of the leading paper manufacturers in Germany.

In 1971 the villages of Heinriet were added to the municipality of Untergruppenbach.

== Untergruppenbach today ==
Although the majority of Untergruppenbach's contemporary residents work in the district of Heilbronn, many are still employed within the municipality or in nearby villages. Viticulture plays a major part in contemporary Untergruppenbach, with the hill upon which Burg Stettenfels stands itself serving as a sloping vineyard. In terms of education, the municipality of Untergruppenbach counts a Hauptschule, two primary schools, two kindergartens, and a Volkshochschule amongst its educational institutions. There are four doctors and two dentists in the municipality, as well as a pharmacy.

Amongst the groups represented in the local politics one can find the CDU (Christian Democratic Union), the SPD (German Socialist Party), the Green Party, and the UWG (Independent Voter Community). In the last municipal elections voter turnout was of 58.06%, with the town turning out mainly in favor of the CDU and the independents. The current mayor of Untergruppenbach is Joachim Weller.

The municipality shares a strong sense of community, with a large number of leisure and sports associations, as well as a volunteer fire brigade. The municipality has a number of churches, amongst them the 100-year-old Johanneskirche. Protestants and Catholics make up the bulk of the community. The village youth in Untergruppenbach can partake in their own Jugendhaus, or Youth House, a property located in the center of town where they can go to meet and spend time together. For local amusement, Untergruppenbach has a fine municipal swimming pool with heated facilities, as well as the TSV sports center, where any number of physical activities can be practiced, amongst them tennis and soccer. Hikers can find particular enjoyment in the surrounding Swabian-Frankish forest, and activities can be scheduled at the Lutz Siegel Hut, which is located within the forest at a short distance from Burg Stettenfels. The castle has a biergarten located on its foreground, open-air during the summer and enclosed in the colder months.

Access to the city of Heilbronn can be achieved easily by autobahn or regular roads. There is regular bus service to and from the city. Nearby villages include Flein, Abstatt, Ilsfeld, Beilstein, Löwenstein, Talheim, Brackenheim and Auenstein.

== Personalities ==
- Theodor Dipper (1903–1969), Protestant pastor and dean (born in Unterheinriet)
- Friedrich Spieser (1902–1987), politician and publisher, longtime owner and inhabitant of Stettenfels Castle
- Thomas Ring (1892–1983), painter, poet, astrologer, lived at Stettenfels Castle from 1962 to 1983
