= Abstatt =

- Municipality
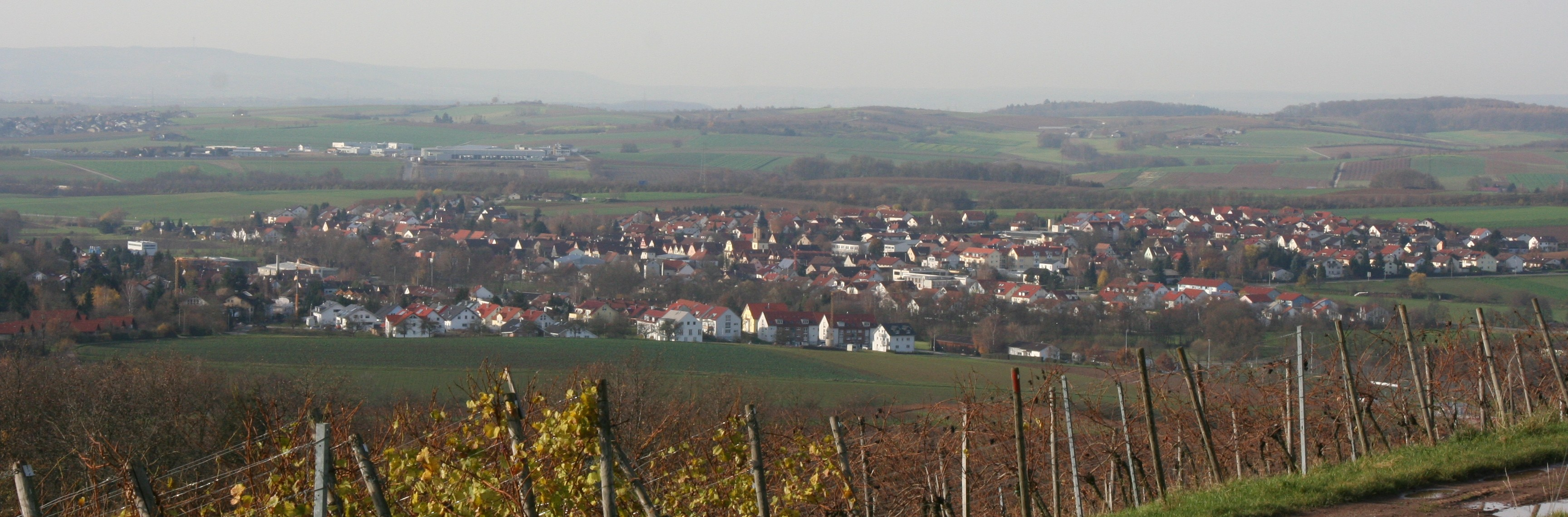

- Coat of arms

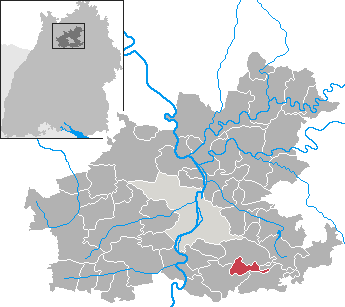
- Location of Abstatt within Heilbronn district
- Interactive map of Abstatt
- Location within Germany Location within Baden-Württemberg
- Coordinates: 49°4′N 9°18′E
- Country: Germany
- State: Baden-Württemberg
- Admin. region: Stuttgart
- District: Heilbronn
- Municipal assoc.: Schozach-Bottwartal
- Subdivisions: 3

Government
  - Mayor (2019–27): Klaus Zenth

Area
  - Total: 9.66 km^{2} (3.73 sq mi)
- Elevation: 241 m (791 ft)

Population (2025-12-31)
  - Total: 5,000
  - Density: 520/km^{2} (1,300/sq mi)
- Time zone: UTC+01:00 (CET)
  - Summer (DST): UTC+02:00 (CEST)
- Postal codes: 74232
- Dialling codes: 07062
- Vehicle registration: HN
- Website: www.abstatt.de

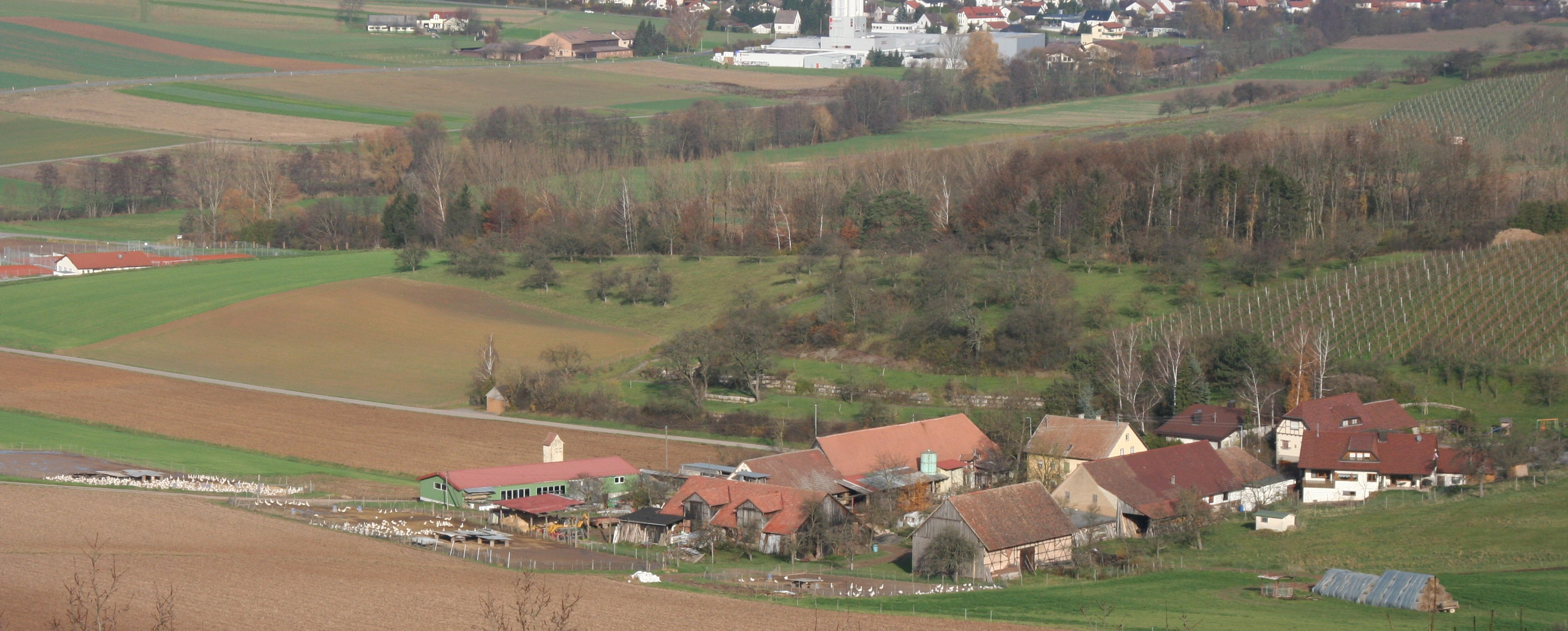
Vohenlohe

Abstatt (German: [ˈapʃtat]) is a municipality in the district of Heilbronn in Baden-Württemberg in southern Germany.

== Geography ==
Abstatt is situated in the south of the district of Heilbronn at the Schozach river. Heilbronn is about 10 kilometres (6 mi) to the northwest.

=== Neighbouring municipalities ===
Neighbouring towns and villages of Abstatt are (clockwise from the west): Ilsfeld, Untergruppenbach, Lauffen am Neckar (exclave town forest Etzlenswenden) and Beilstein, which all belong to the district of Heilbronn. Abstatt has combined with Beilstein, Ilsfeld and Untergruppenbach to form a joint association of administrations called Schozach-Bottwartal.

=== Municipal structure ===
There are no further villages belonging to Abstatt, but there are two hamlets called Happenbach and Vohenlohe.

== History ==
Abstatt was first mentioned documentary in 1293. In 1510 Abstatt came to Württemberg. The villages Happenbach and Vohenlohe were even administrated by Abstatt since the 18th century. In 1938 the municipality came to the district of Heilbronn which was founded this year.

Until the World War II the municipality was characterized agri-culturally, later it developed into a residential area nearby Heilbronn.

== Politics ==
=== District council ===
Following the municipal election of 13 June 2004, the district council of Abstatt has 14 seats. The election result is as follows:

party	amount	+/-	seats	+/-
CDU	46.9%	(+5.3)	7	(=)
FW Abstatt	28.7%	(−9.8)	4	(−2)
SPD	24.4%	(+4.5)	3	(=)

The mayor is also a member of the district council and its chairman.

=== Arms and flag ===
Arms of Abstatt

Blazon: Within a split sign in front in red a golden abbot stick, in the background in gold a red lion. The municipal flag is red and white.

A seal of Abstatt from 1628 belonging to the Löwenstein County, contains the arms of Löwenstein: a lion. In 1907 the municipality asked for a new arms suggestion from the archive direction of Württemberg. Then the direction suggested the today's seal. Since it first was rejected as the conventional seal the direction made a second suggestion. However, the municipality decided to take the previous suggestion. The flag was given by the district of Heilbronn on September 5, 1980.

=== Twin municipality ===
There's a relationship with Léhon in the French Département Côtes-d'Armor.

== Culture and sights ==
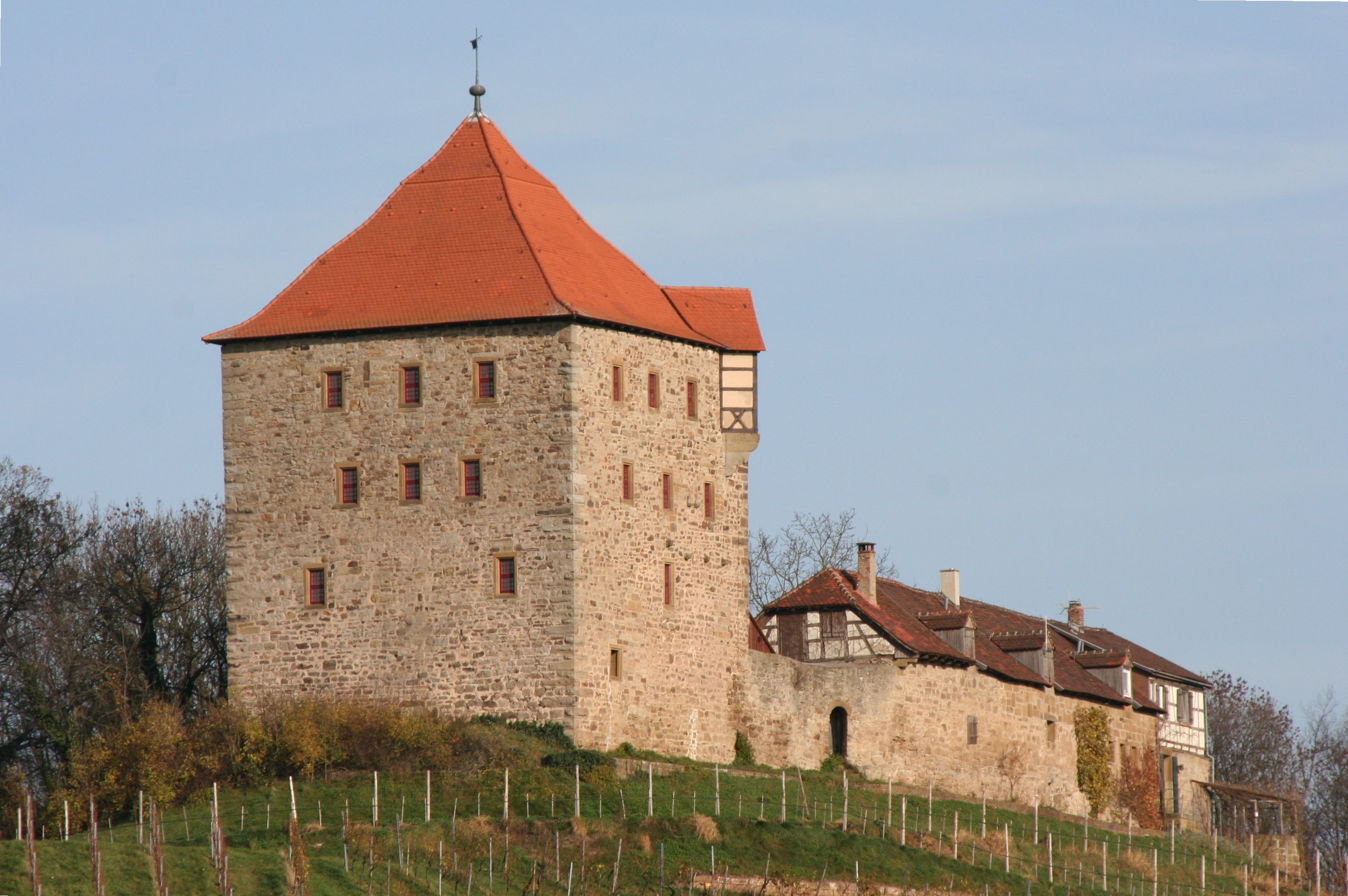
Wildeck Castle

=== Museums ===
Abstatt has a native museum at its disposal.

=== Notable buildings ===
- The Wildeck Castle near Vohenlohe was built in the 12th century and contains a wine-growing school today.
- The Protestant parish church St. Stephan was built in 1766 in rococo style upon the remnants of an older Gothic construction.
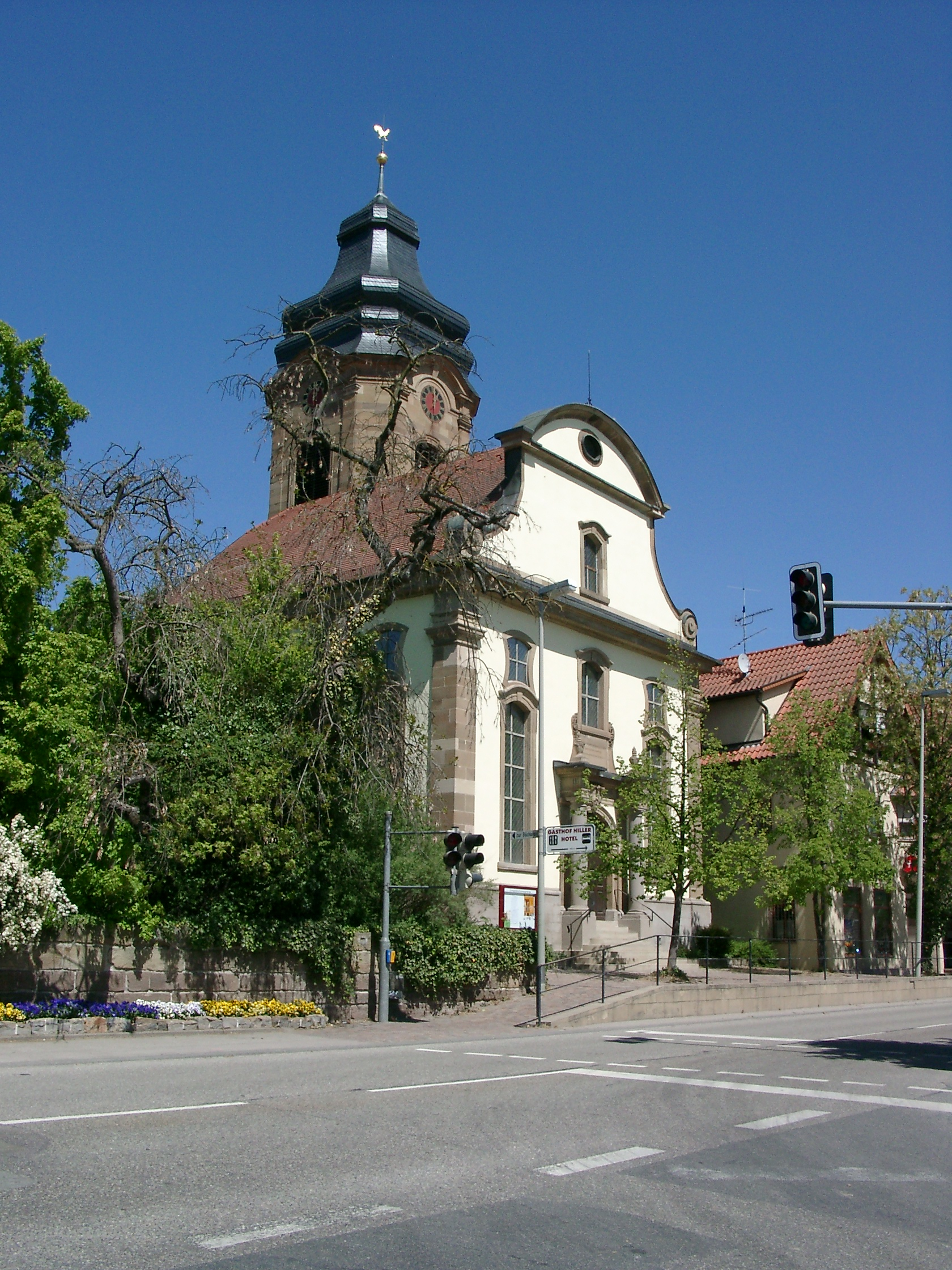
Protestant church

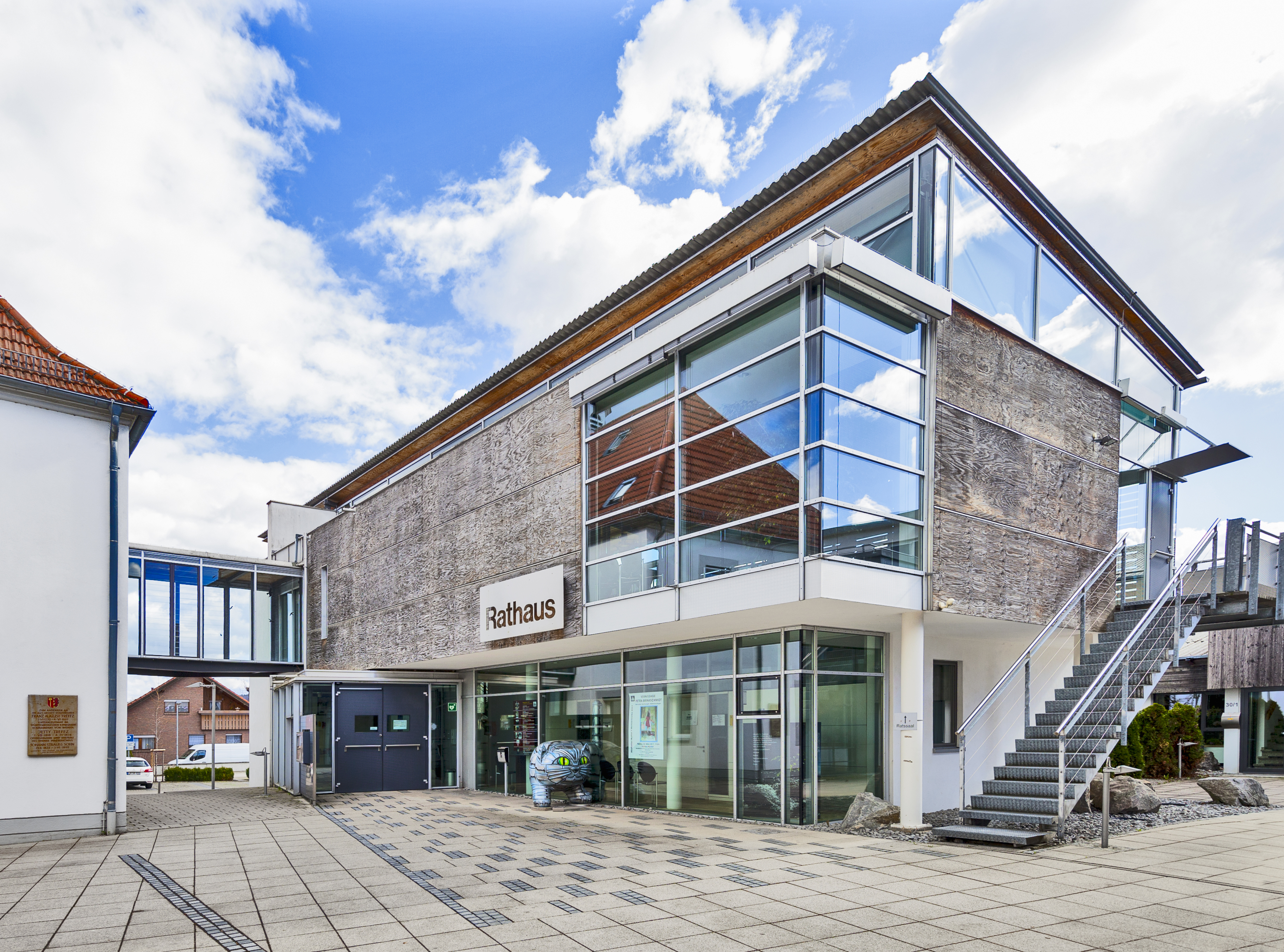
town hall
- In Happenbach there's the renovated historical school house containing the today's citizen's forum. An old baking house reminds on this old rural infrastructure. Besides there's a village square with a fountain.
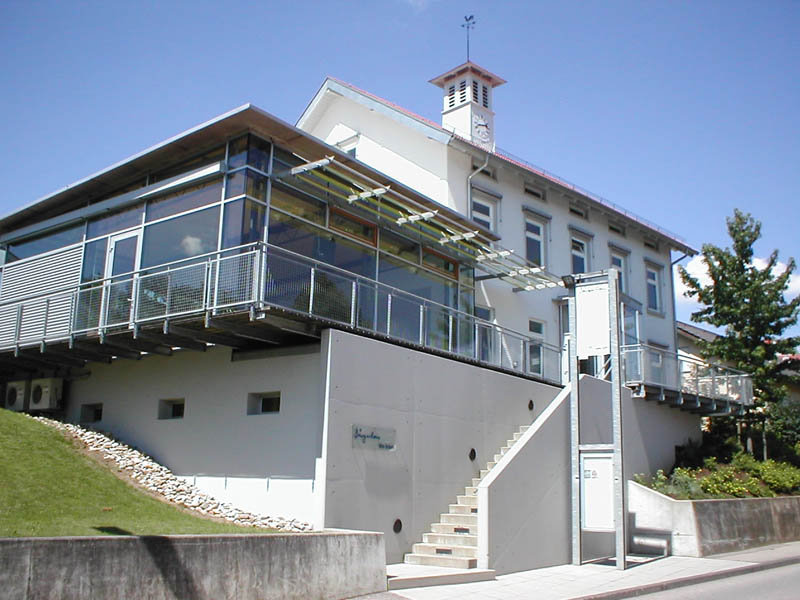
citizen's forum, old school house

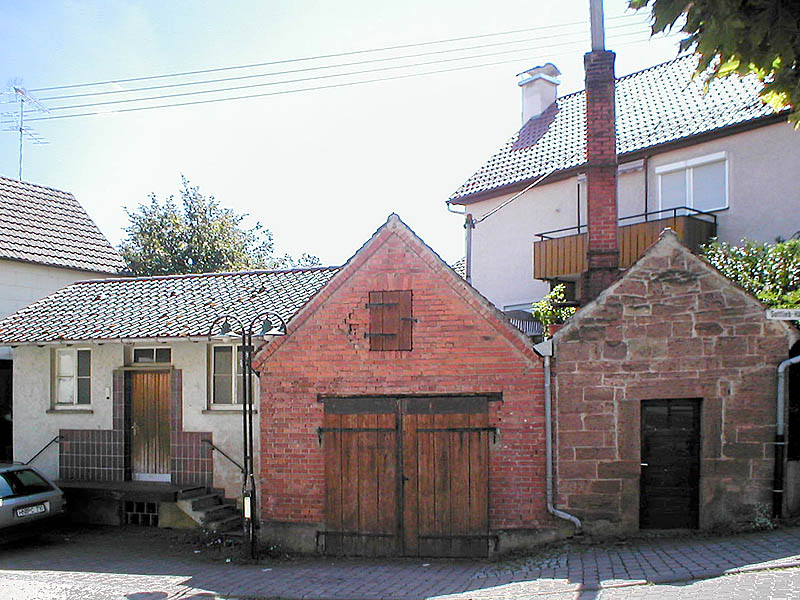
baking house

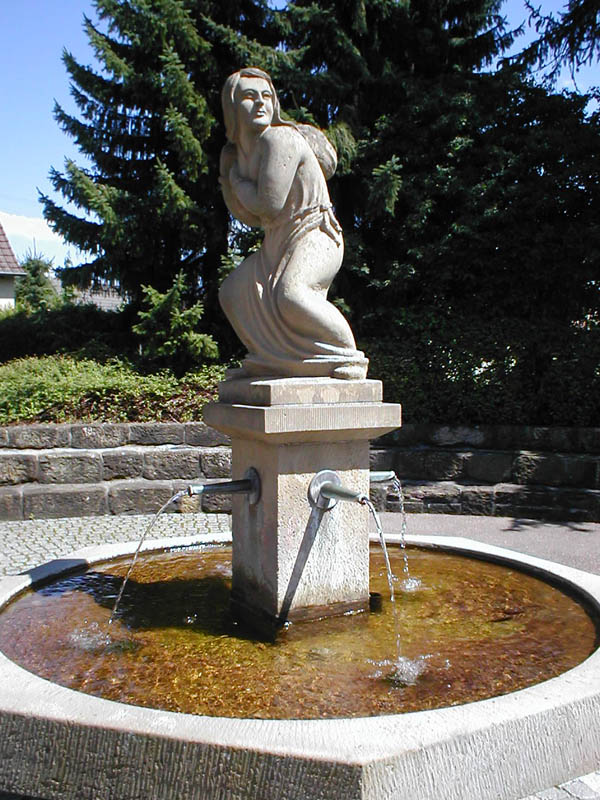
fountain at the village square

== Economy and infrastructure ==
=== Wine ===
Abstatt is a wine-growing village whose area belongs to the Schozach valley in the wine-growing area Württemberg. There's a varietal named after a part of the municipality called Happenbach.

=== Transport ===
Abstatt is situated on the A 81 between the exits for Ilsfeld and Heilbronn/Untergruppenbach.

=== Local businesses ===
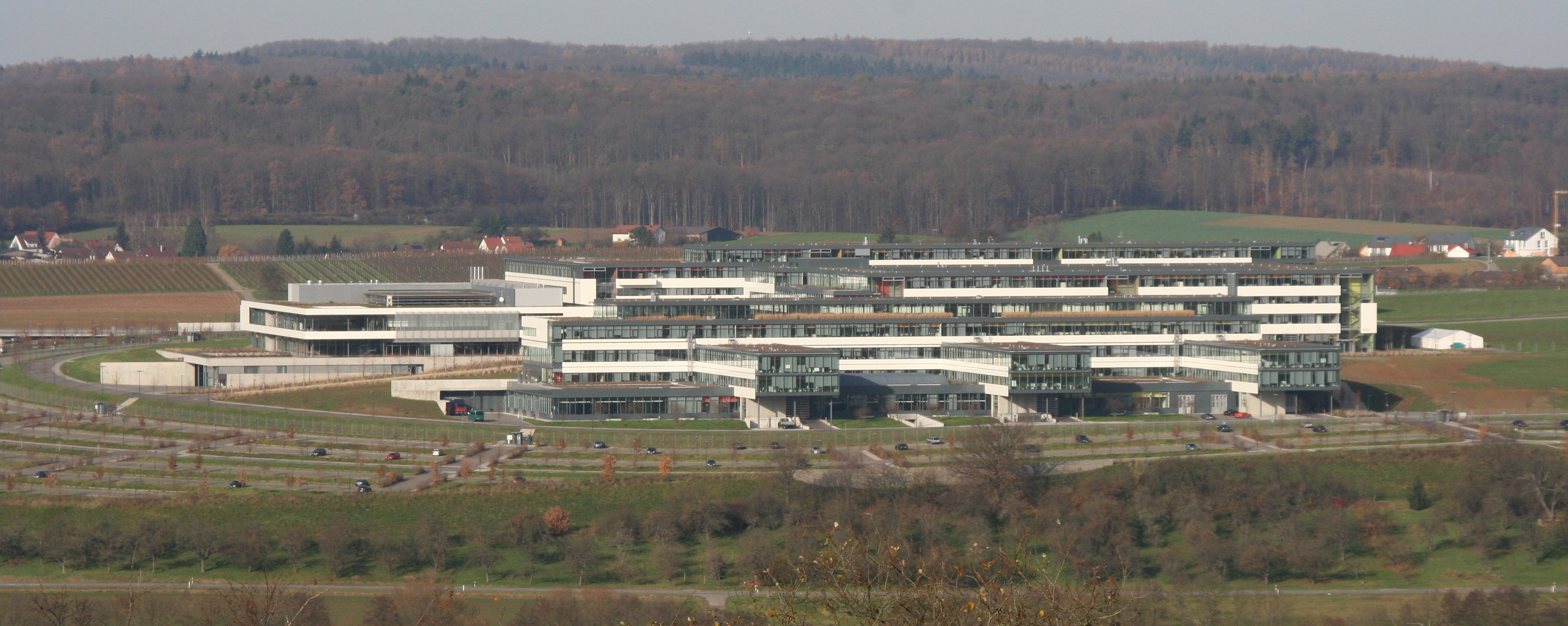
Bosch area in Abstatt

Since 2004 the Robert Bosch GmbH is represented by a development area employing 5,800 people (October 2019). There's also the subsidiary company Bosch Engineering GmbH. Abstatt is the main site of the SAP system house Steeb Anwendungssysteme GmbH belonging to SAP AG. Steeb cares about the middle classes in SAP.

The international record label Massacre Records is also in Abstatt.

=== Media ===
The Heilbronner Stimme informs about happenings in Abstatt within its edition SO, South-East.

=== Public institutions ===
Around the Wildeck Castle the Staatliche Lehr- und Versuchsanstalt für Wein- und Obstbau Weinsberg carries on ecological viticulture.

=== Education ===
Abstatt has a primary school including the municipal library at its disposal.

== Personalities ==
=== Born in Abstatt ===
- Josef Bick (1880–1952), philologist, general director of the Austrian national library and prisoner of the KZ Dachau

=== Connected with Abstatt ===
- Alexander Bertsch (born 1940), author; lives in Abstatt
- Wolfgang Bebbel (born 1943), politician; 1980–1996 member of the district council of Abstatt
- Ingo Rust (born 1978), politician; voted to be the youngest member ever of the district council in 1999
