= Schmohl & Stähelin =

German architectural firm

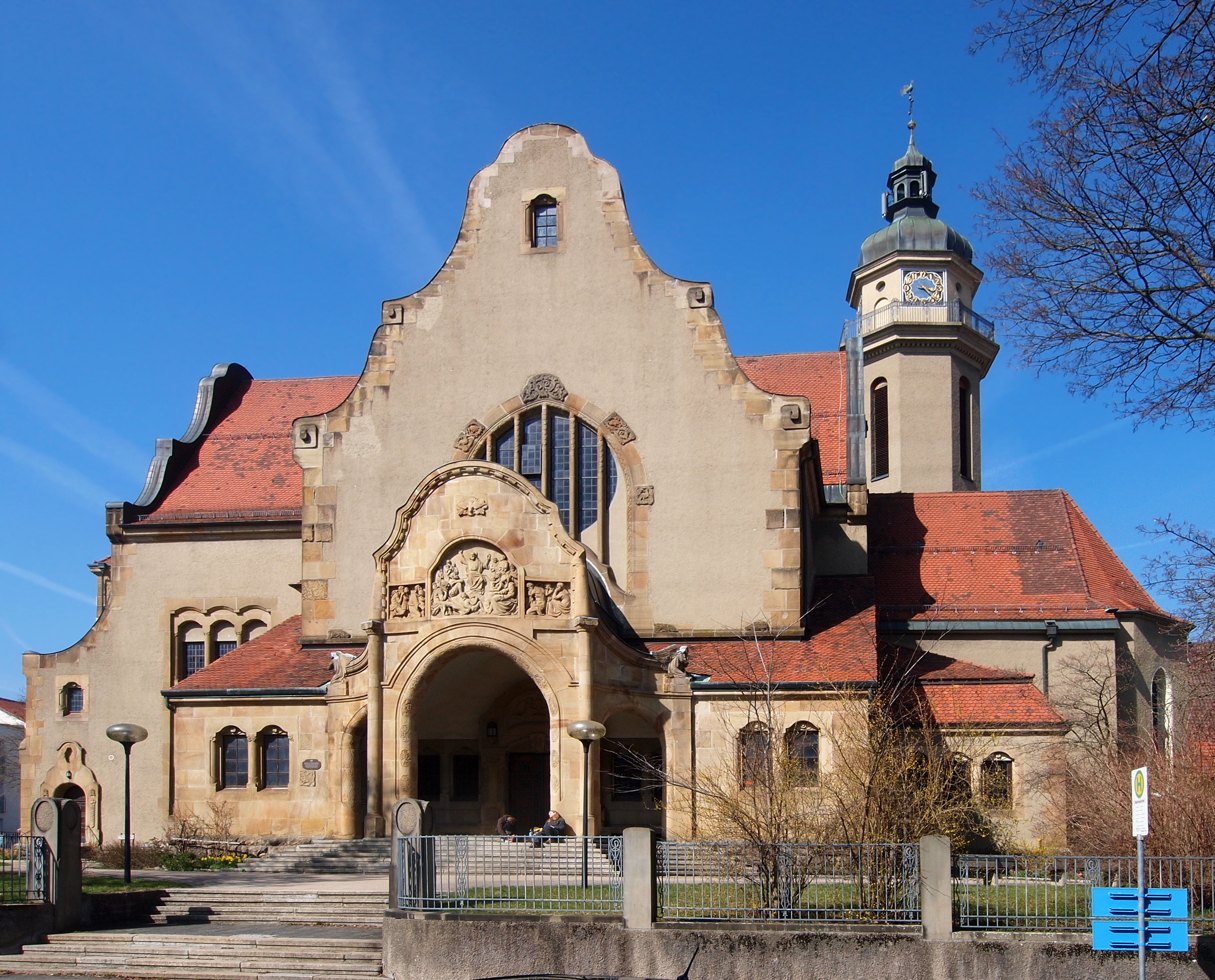
St. Martin's Church in Ebingen, Germany, by Schmohl & Stähelin

Schmohl & Stähelin was an architecture firm based in Stuttgart, Baden-Württemberg, Germany, extant from 1895 until about 1940. Its principals were Paul Schmohl (1870–1946) and Georg Stähelin (1872–1941 or 1950), who were responsible for the popularity of the Heimatstil and Heimatschutzstil (“homeland style” and “homeland security style”) of architecture in Baden-Württemberg during the first two decades of the twentieth century.

== Early life and training ==
Paul Schmohl was born in Bad Cannstatt in 1870, the son of the Ludwigsburg-born master builder Johannes Schmohl. His future partner Georg Stähelin was born in Singapore two years later, and studied architecture with Danish-German architect Skjold Neckelmann. The two met in college during the early 1890s at the Technische Hochschule Stuttgart, now the University of Stuttgart, while the university was undergoing a rapid expansion, with Schmohl graduating in 1894. The following year, the two formed the partnership Schmohl & Stähelin, which lasted into the 1930s.

== Early careers ==
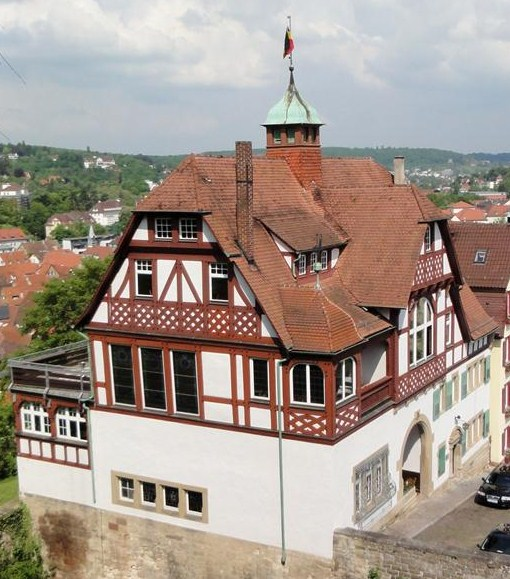
The Roigelhaus in Tübingen, designed by Schmohl & Stähelin and built in 1904

Schmohl & Stähelin enjoyed some early success as they were commissioned to design the picturesque "Gewerbedorf" and "Schuckerthaus" for the Stuttgarter Gewerbeaußtellung (Stuttgart Decorative Exhibition) of 1896. This was followed by a number of residential commissions in central Stuttgart and the liminal districts beyond over roughly the next fifteen years. The two quickly developed an interest in historicism and native German regional architecture. Between 1900 and 1907 they constructed several villas as well as the “Bürgerhalle” in the Upper Herdweg district of northern Stuttgart in a kind of Heimatschutzstil or a Baroque-revival style, as well as houses nearby in the Hauptmannsreute and the Feuerbacher Heide districts. Schmohl & Stähelin were influenced greatly by the architect Theodor Fischer, one of their colleagues at the Technische Hochschule Stuttgart between 1901 and 1908.

Early on the pair were influenced somewhat by the new style of Jugendstil, the German strands of Art Nouveau, popular around 1900 but quickly discarded amongst most German architects by 1905. Their completed residential commissions in the style include the Villa Schliz in Heilbronn (1901) and the Villa Franck in Murrhardt (1905–07), a castle-like mansion built on a hillside for a Ludwigsburg-based chicory manufacturer Robert Franck with a baroque exterior. The latter includes a monumental staircase and forty-two rooms that employ Jugendstil décor and were technologically advanced for the time. In Murrhardt as well, they remodeled the Protestant parish church of St. Bartholomew, built in 1905–06, incorporating the late Gothic choir and tower into a new design that uses both Heimatstil and Jugendstil elements. They employed a similar strategy in their contemporaneous remodeling of the evangelical parish church of St. Martin in Ebingen, choosing Jugendstil for the new sections of the building which they connected to the choir and sacristy, dating from 1473, and the lower part of the tower, originally built in 1670–72.

== Expansion of practice ==
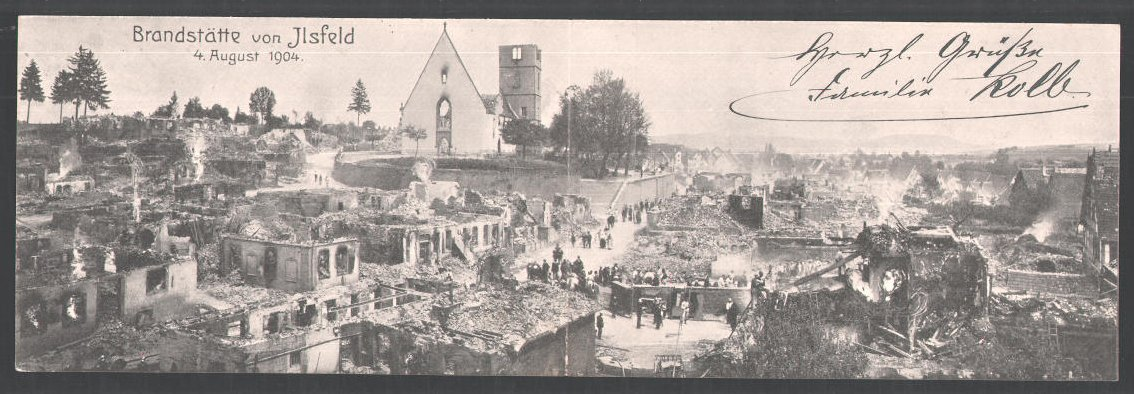
Aftermath of the fire in Ilsfeld of 4 August 1904. Schmohl & Stähelin were awarded part of the commission to rebuild this district.

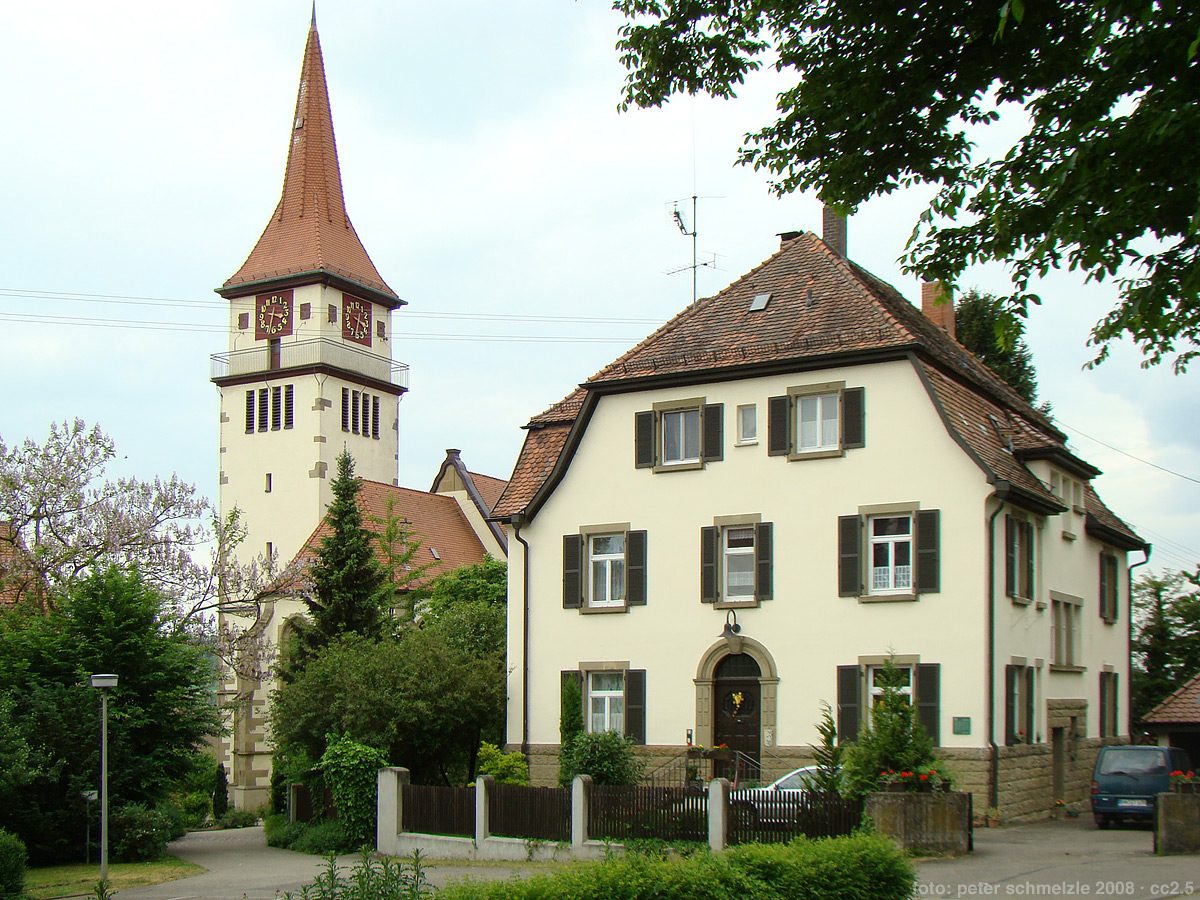
St. Bartholomew's Church in Ilsfeld was one of the structures rebuilt to Schmohl & Stähelin's designs between 1904 and 1906.

During the decade immediately preceding the outbreak of the First World War in 1914 Schmohl & Stähelin's practice expanded considerably beyond Stuttgart. In 1904, the firm entered the competition to rebuild the district of Ilsfeld in Heilbronn, which had recently been destroyed in a large fire that August, and were rewarded with much of the commission for reconstructing the public buildings. These included the town hall, church, school, teacher's and minister's residences, and the Dorastift kindergarten.

As the rebuilding of Ilsfeld suggests, Schmohl & Stähelin designed a great variety of structures during this period. They were adept in producing designs for several educational structures, including the former Royal High School called the Stadtbad and two other secondary schools in Schmohl's hometown of Ludwigsburg, all constructed between 1907 and 1909. In 1913 they completed a new mechanical engineering school in Esslingen using monumental neoclassical forms. Between 1913 and 1914 they completed the Konzerthaus (concert hall) in Heidenheim, funded by the local industrialist Friedrich Voith. They also completed two significant factories in Stuttgart: first, a massive five-story structure for producing surgical and orthopedic instruments for Wilhelm Julius Teufel between 1907 and 1911; and second, the Bühler leather furniture factory, finished in 1910.

The pair placed third in the 1908 architectural competition for the new Stuttgart Opera House with their design called "Beethoven", which was described as using "a strict, two-dimensional neo-classicism." The commission was entrusted to the Munich-based theatre architect Max Littmann, who had won the winner of the competition, but Schmohl & Stähelin were involved in the construction management "in order to spare the justified sensitivities of the country team in what is currently the largest new construction project in the country."

== Institutional service ==
Schmohl in particular was rewarded in institutional circles for this early success. In 1900 he was appointed a professor of structural engineering at the Königlich Württembergische Baugewerkeschule (Royal Württemberg Applied Building School), which he held until 1904, before returning solely to private practice. He changed course again in 1906 when he became the school's managing director, eventually renamed the Württembergische Baugewerkeschule in 1918 and then in 1924 the Staatliche Höhere Bauschule (State Superior Building School), which he directed until his retirement in 1935. In this post, he oversaw the redesign of the entire curriculum and brought it in line with contemporary educational practices.

In an innovative move, Schmohl had pushed the local government in Stuttgart to create the "Beratungsstelle für das Baugewerbe” (Advice Center for the Construction Industry), which it finally did in 1905. This was the first institution of its kind in Germany, and was soon emulated by other state and local authorities. It provided consulting services to municipal officials, builders, and craftsmen on virtually all matters relating to construction. Schmohl served as the organization's first chair from its inception until 1924.

== Historic preservation and publications ==
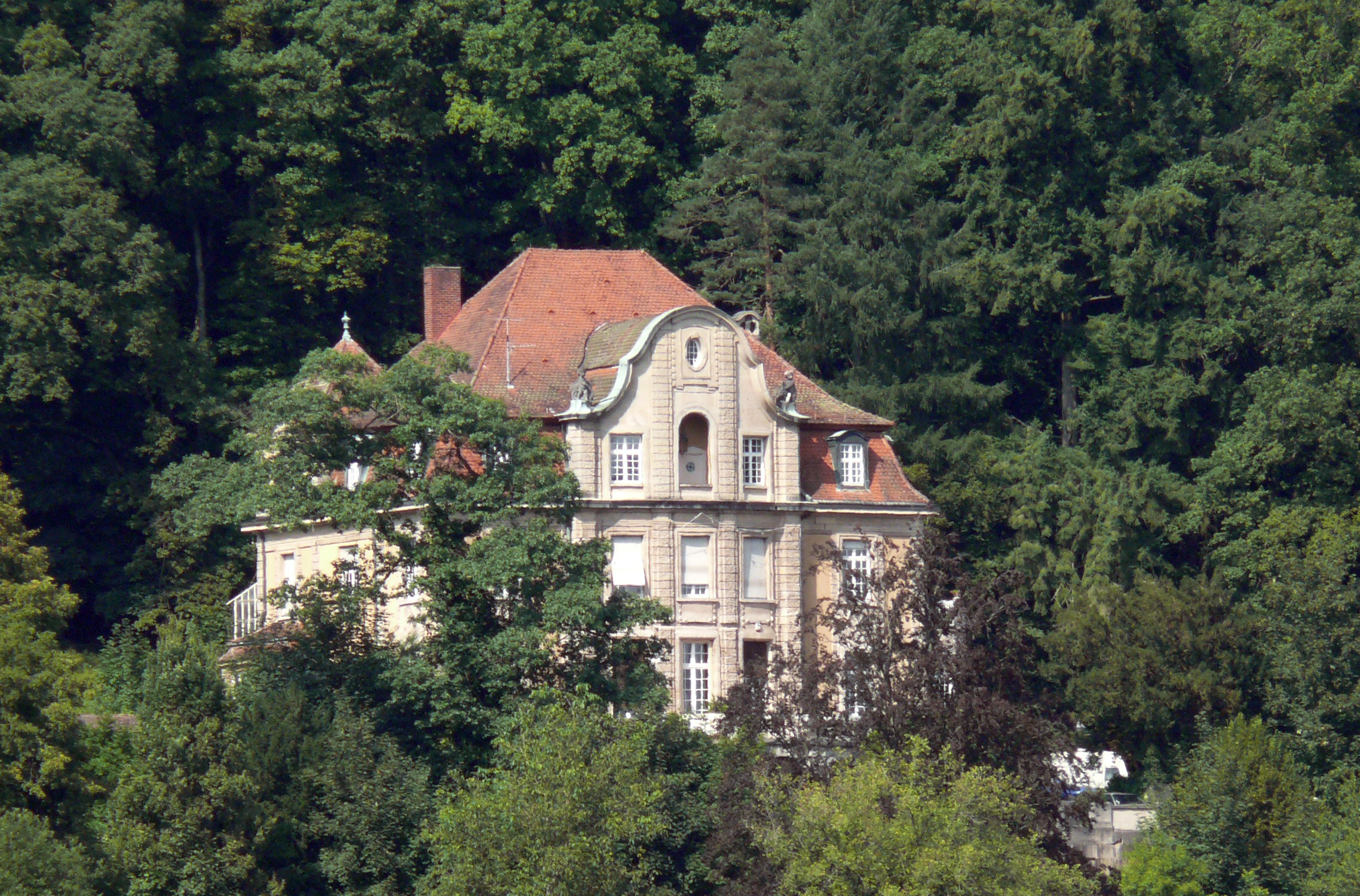
The Villa Franck in Murrhardt, built by Schmohl & Stähelin from 1904 to 1907

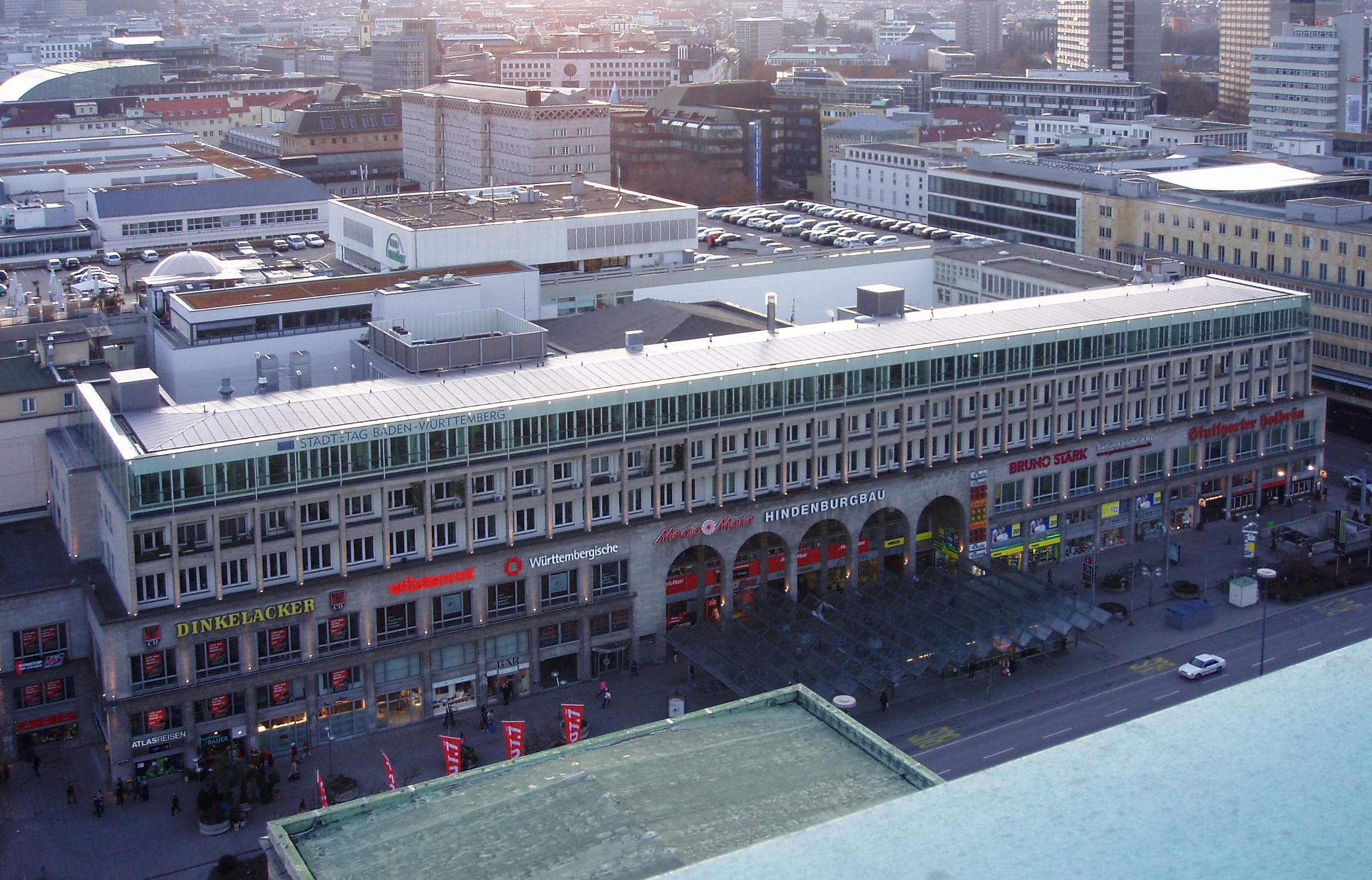
The Hindenburgbau in Stuttgart, photographed from the tower of the central train station

In 1909 Schmohl was one of the founders of the "Württembergische Bund für Heimatschutz,” the regional chapter of the Bünd für Heimatschutz, a national network of cultural figures interested in regional studies, history, art, and landscape protection, and likewise served as its first chairman until 1914. But even before then, as the above sections suggest, the pair had been interested in historic preservation and historicism. In 1904, following the advice of Theodor Fischer, they had constructed an addition to the Roigelhaus, the historic home of the Königsgesellschaft (Royal Society), on the Burgsteige in central Tübingen, south of Stuttgart. The regionalist structure uses a steep roof with half-timbered gables; an asymmetrical plan with picturesque massing and an arched portal, all of which is reminiscent of the historic architecture of the Schlossküferei. In 1909, they remodeled the Tübingen fruit market into a trade school, exposing the plastered half-timbering and interior beams; at the same time, they designed the extension to the Tübingen town hall (Rathaus) with a new wing that matched the architecture of the historic structure.

Schmohl exerted considerable influence on the expansion of building activity in the Stuttgart basin, primarily through the demand for a general development plan for the preservation of green spaces and landscaping of the mountainous terrain, among other projects. One source cites him in 1912 criticizing recent development of such hilly areas, arguing “that the streets were cut into the mountains without any deeper feeling.”

Schmohl & Stähelin became heavily involved in the publication of works chronicling the historical built environment in Stuttgart and Baden-Württemberg (and elsewhere). These include:

- Volkstümliche Kunst aus Schwaben [Folk Art in Swabia], (1908; 2nd edition, 1913).
- Charakterbauten des Auslandes. Frankreich [Representative Foreign Buildings: France] (1911).
- “Die bauliche Entwicklung Stuttgarts,” in Mitteilungen des Bundes für Heimatschutz in Württemberg und Hohenzollern 4, no. 2 (1912).
- Die Architektonische Auslese: Württemburgische Fürstensitze (Stuttgart: Wilhelm Meyer-Ilschen, 1913).
- Die Architektonische Auslese: Wiener Barock, einführung von Walter von Semetkowski (Stuttgart: Wilhelm Meyer-Ilschen, 1913).

== Interwar period ==
In the 1920s and 1930s, Schmohl & Stähelin became known more for their commercial architecture rather than institutional and residential designs. They were some of the primary designers involved in the conversion of the old train station in Stuttgart for the companies Bahnhofsbau AG and Industriehof AG when the new station, having been in the works since 1912, was finally finished to designs of Paul Bonatz and put into service in 1927. They were instrumental in transforming the old station's reception hall into the UFA-Palast, a cinema, later renamed the Metropol.

Opposite the new station, Schmohl & Stähelin partnered with Albert Eitel and Richard Bielenberg on the design for the Hindenburg building, constructed between 1926 and 1928, which contained offices, shops, and a theater. The very long prismatic structure borrows heavily from the New Objectivity (International Style) but retains a neoclassical austerity with a set of nine-meter-high arches in the center and the cladding in limestone tiles.

== List of works ==
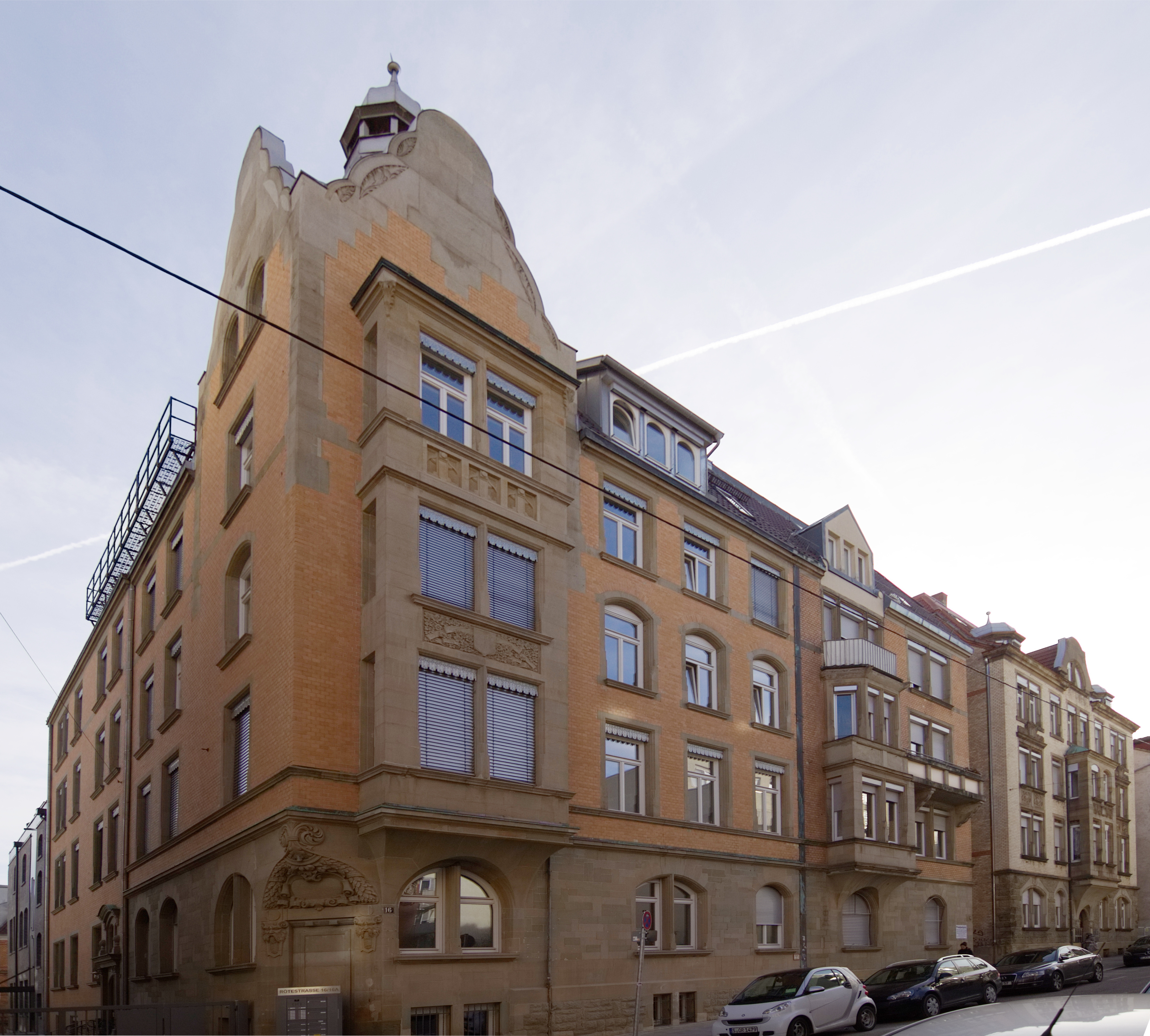
Apartment buildings at Rötestraße 12–16 in Stuttgart, 1901–02

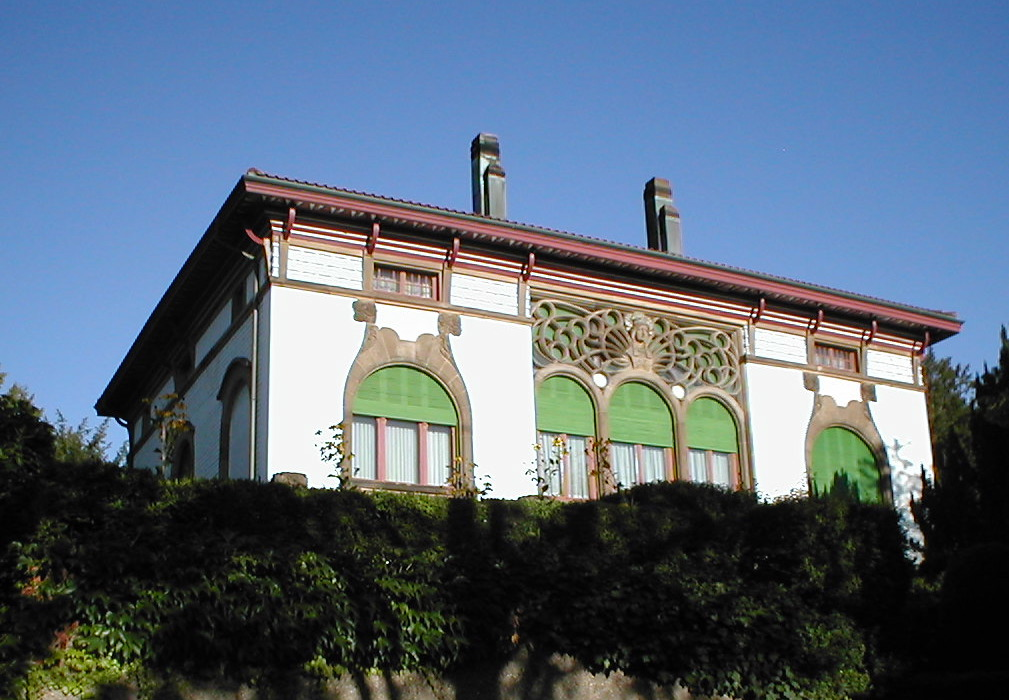
Villa Schliz in Heilbronn, built in 1901

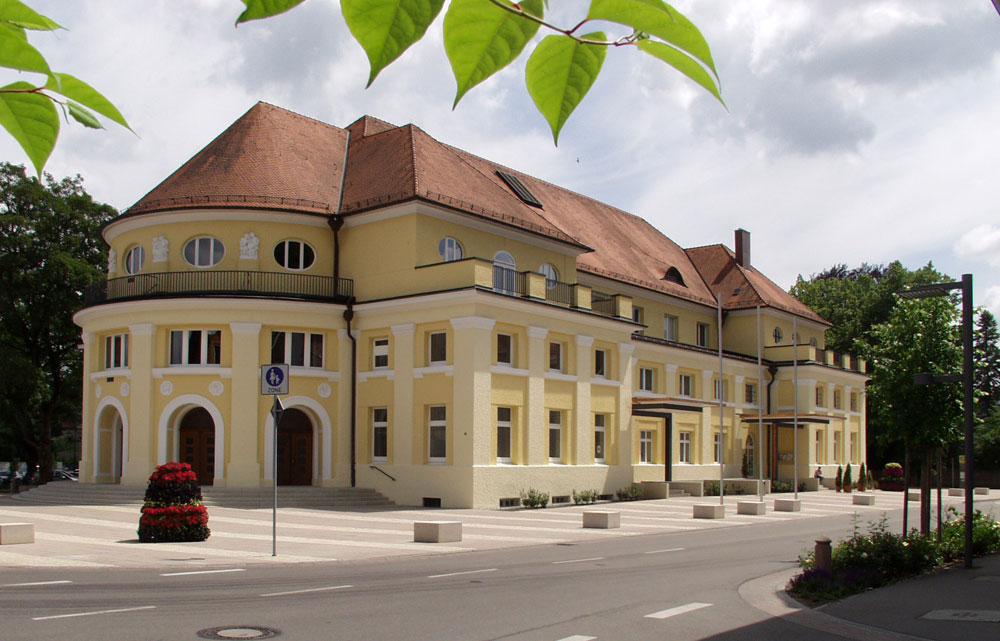
Concert Hall in Heidenheim, 1914

- 1890: Villa at Gänsheidestrasse 35, Stuttgart
- 1900: Building of the Teufel company, Neckarstrasse, Stuttgart
- 1901: Villa Schliz in Heilbronn, Alexanderstraße 53
- 1901–02: “Röteburg” in Stuttgart, Rötestraße 12–16
- 1902: Citizens' Hall in Stuttgart
- 1902: Villa Java in Stuttgart, Stafflenbergstrasse 34
- 1902: Houses at Herdweg 96–98, Stuttgart-Relenberg
- 1902: Apartment building at Alexanderstraße 118, Stuttgart
- 1902: Group of apartment buildings at Paulusstrasse 4–10, Stuttgart
- 1903: Villa, Valentin-Becker-Straße 29, Bad Brückenau
- 1904: Roigelhaus for the Royal Society Roigel, Tübingen
- 1904–07: Villa Hohenstein (Villa Franck), Hohenstein 1, Murrhardt
- 1904–06: Reconstruction of the public buildings in Ilsfeld after the city fire of 1904
- 1905–06: Reconstruction of the Bartholomäuskirche in Ilsfeld
- 1905–06: Partial new construction of the Protestant Martinskirche in Ebingen
- 1906–07: Villa in Stuttgart-Relenberg, Herdweg 10
- 1906: Villa Malabar in Stuttgart, Stafflenbergstrasse 36
- 1908: Stadtbad in Ludwigsburg
- 1908–09: Villa Schöttle in Stuttgart-Sonnenberg, Falkenstrasse 8
- 1910: Bühler leather furniture factory, Rosenbergstrasse, Stuttgart
- 1910–11: Villa Gut Berneck, Schramberg (for the entrepreneur Arthur Junghans)
- 1911: Schiller-Mörike-Gymnasium, Ludwigsburg
- 1911: Emil Kienlin villa, Mörikestrasse 4, Esslingen am Neckar
- 1913–1914: Heidenheim concert hall
- 1922: Villa in Stuttgart, Feuerbacher Heide 49
- 1922: Villa in Stuttgart, Salzmannweg 11
- 1924: Villa Mayser, Eduard-Pfeiffer-Strasse 20, Stuttgart
- 1922–1923: Houses at Ganghoferstraße 24 and 28, Stuttgart-Lenzhaide
- 1925–26: Ufa-Palast cinema (later Metropol), Bolzstrasse 10, Stuttgart
- 1928: Hindenburgbau office and commercial building (with Germany's largest concert café at the time) opposite Stuttgart Central Station
- before 1933: Lutheran Church in Stuttgart-Feuerbach
