= Annasee =

Lake in Beilstein, Germany

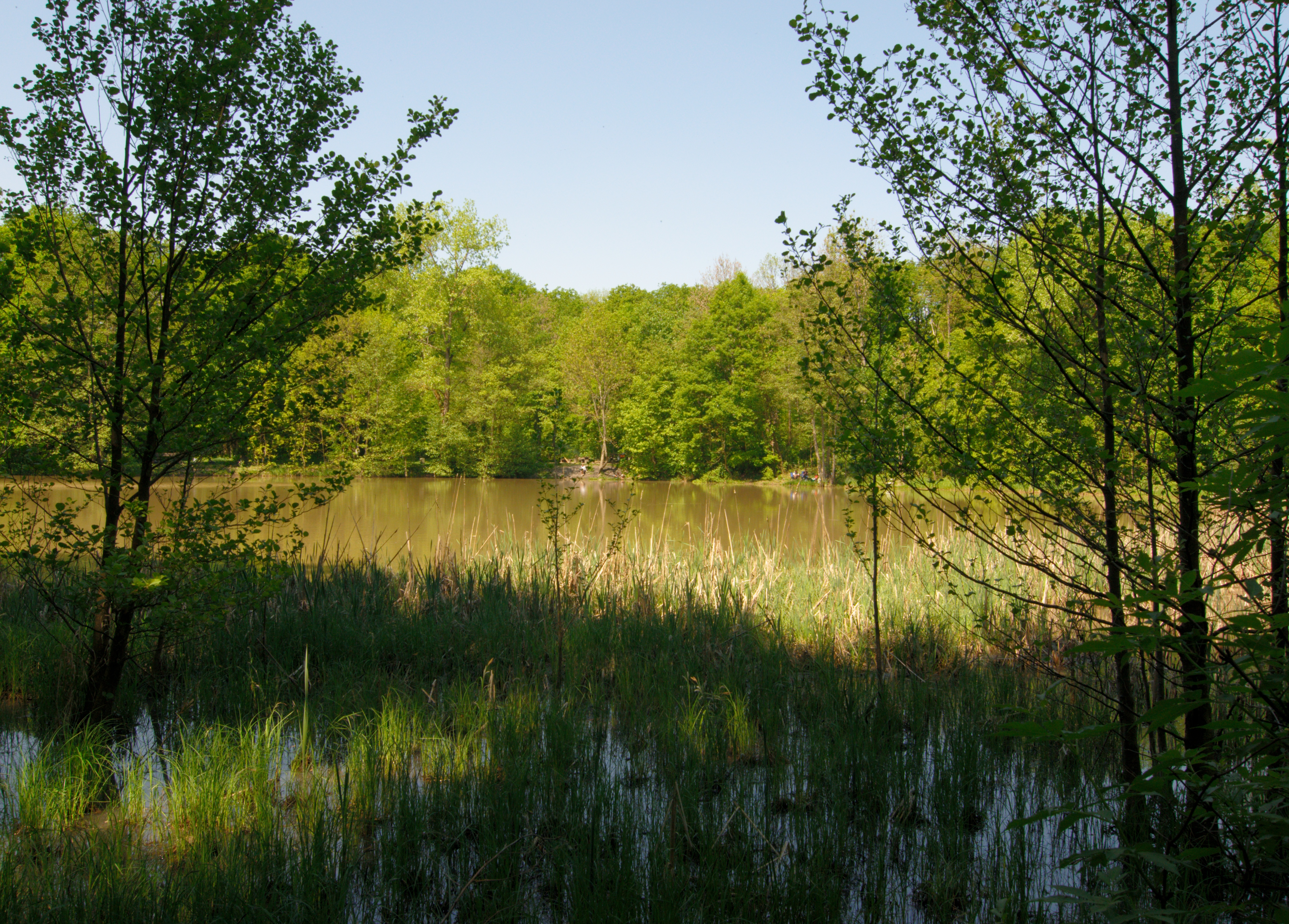
- The Annasee seen from its eastern shore

- Location within Baden-Württemberg
- Location: Beilstein, Landkreis Heilbronn, Baden-Württemberg
- Coordinates: 49°3′45″N 9°20′2.45″E
- Basin countries: Germany

Annasee (Lake Anna) is a lake in Beilstein, Landkreis Heilbronn, Baden-Württemberg, Germany. The lake was also known as Tannensee in the 19th century, although the exact reasons for this are unknown. Geographically, Annasee is located approximately three kilometers northeast of the city of Beilstein. It is also located within the Swabian-Franconian Forest and in the valley of the Schozach River. The lake was designated a protected landscape area on the landscape conservation map in 1951.
