= Heilbronn (Bundestag electoral district) =

Federal electoral district of Germany

267 Heilbronn
- Electoral district for the Bundestag
- Heilbronn in 2025
- State: Baden-Württemberg
- Population: 362,000 (2019)
- Electorate: 240,951 (2021)
- Major settlements: Heilbronn; Neckarsulm; Eppingen
- Area: 904.9 km^{2}

Current electoral district
- Created: 1949
- Party: CDU
- Member: Alexander Throm
- Elected: 2017, 2021, 2025

Heilbronn is an electoral constituency (German: Wahlkreis) represented in the Bundestag. It elects one member via first-past-the-post voting. Under the current constituency numbering system, it is designated as constituency 267. It is located in northern Baden-Württemberg, comprising the city of Heilbronn and the northern part of the Landkreis Heilbronn district.

Heilbronn was created for the inaugural 1949 federal election. Since 2017, it has been represented by Alexander Throm of the Christian Democratic Union (CDU).

== Geography ==
Heilbronn is located in northern Baden-Württemberg. As of the 2021 federal election, it comprises the independent city of Heilbronn and the municipalities of Bad Friedrichshall, Bad Rappenau, Bad Wimpfen, Eberstadt, Ellhofen, Eppingen, Erlenbach, Gemmingen, Gundelsheim, Hardthausen am Kocher, Ittlingen, Jagsthausen, Kirchardt, Langenbrettach, Lehrensteinsfeld, Löwenstein, Massenbachhausen, Möckmühl, Neckarsulm, Neudenau, Neuenstadt am Kocher, Obersulm, Oedheim, Offenau, Roigheim, Schwaigern, Siegelsbach, Untereisesheim, Weinsberg, Widdern, and Wüstenrot from the Landkreis Heilbronn district.

== History ==
Heilbronn was created in 1949. In the 1949 election, it was Württemberg-Baden Landesbezirk Württemberg constituency 4 in the numbering system. In the 1953 through 1961 elections, it was number 166. In the 1965 through 1976 elections, it was number 168. In the 1980 through 1998 elections, it was number 171. In the 2002 and 2005 elections, it was number 268. Since the 2009 election, it has been number 267.

Originally, the constituency comprised the independent city of Heilbronn and the district of Landkreis Heilbronn. In the 1976 election, it comprised the city of Heilbronn and the southern part of the Landkreis Heilbronn district. It acquired its current borders in the 1980 election.

Election	No.	Name	Borders
1949	4	Heilbronn	Heilbronn city; Landkreis Heilbronn district
1953	166	Heilbronn	Heilbronn city; Landkreis Heilbronn district
1957	166	Heilbronn	Heilbronn city; Landkreis Heilbronn district
1961	166	Heilbronn	Heilbronn city; Landkreis Heilbronn district
1965	168	Heilbronn	Heilbronn city; Landkreis Heilbronn district (only southern parts)
1969	168	Heilbronn	Heilbronn city; Landkreis Heilbronn district (only southern parts)
1972	168	Heilbronn	Heilbronn city; Landkreis Heilbronn district (only southern parts)
1976	168	Heilbronn	Heilbronn city; Landkreis Heilbronn district (only northern parts)
1980	171	Heilbronn	Heilbronn city; Landkreis Heilbronn district (only Bad Friedrichshall, Bad Rappenau, Bad Wimpfen, Eberstadt, Ellhofen, Eppingen, Erlenbach, Gemmingen, Gundelsheim, Hardthausen am Kocher, Ittlingen, Jagsthausen, Kirchardt, Langenbrettach, Lehrensteinsfeld, Löwenstein, Massenbachhausen, Möckmühl, Neckarsulm, Neudenau, Neuenstadt am Kocher, Obersulm, Oedheim, Offenau, Roigheim, Schwaigern, Siegelsbach, Untereisesheim, Weinsberg, Widdern, and Wüstenrot municipalities)
1983	171	Heilbronn	Heilbronn city; Landkreis Heilbronn district (only Bad Friedrichshall, Bad Rappenau, Bad Wimpfen, Eberstadt, Ellhofen, Eppingen, Erlenbach, Gemmingen, Gundelsheim, Hardthausen am Kocher, Ittlingen, Jagsthausen, Kirchardt, Langenbrettach, Lehrensteinsfeld, Löwenstein, Massenbachhausen, Möckmühl, Neckarsulm, Neudenau, Neuenstadt am Kocher, Obersulm, Oedheim, Offenau, Roigheim, Schwaigern, Siegelsbach, Untereisesheim, Weinsberg, Widdern, and Wüstenrot municipalities)
1987	171	Heilbronn	Heilbronn city; Landkreis Heilbronn district (only Bad Friedrichshall, Bad Rappenau, Bad Wimpfen, Eberstadt, Ellhofen, Eppingen, Erlenbach, Gemmingen, Gundelsheim, Hardthausen am Kocher, Ittlingen, Jagsthausen, Kirchardt, Langenbrettach, Lehrensteinsfeld, Löwenstein, Massenbachhausen, Möckmühl, Neckarsulm, Neudenau, Neuenstadt am Kocher, Obersulm, Oedheim, Offenau, Roigheim, Schwaigern, Siegelsbach, Untereisesheim, Weinsberg, Widdern, and Wüstenrot municipalities)
1990	171	Heilbronn	Heilbronn city; Landkreis Heilbronn district (only Bad Friedrichshall, Bad Rappenau, Bad Wimpfen, Eberstadt, Ellhofen, Eppingen, Erlenbach, Gemmingen, Gundelsheim, Hardthausen am Kocher, Ittlingen, Jagsthausen, Kirchardt, Langenbrettach, Lehrensteinsfeld, Löwenstein, Massenbachhausen, Möckmühl, Neckarsulm, Neudenau, Neuenstadt am Kocher, Obersulm, Oedheim, Offenau, Roigheim, Schwaigern, Siegelsbach, Untereisesheim, Weinsberg, Widdern, and Wüstenrot municipalities)
1994	171	Heilbronn	Heilbronn city; Landkreis Heilbronn district (only Bad Friedrichshall, Bad Rappenau, Bad Wimpfen, Eberstadt, Ellhofen, Eppingen, Erlenbach, Gemmingen, Gundelsheim, Hardthausen am Kocher, Ittlingen, Jagsthausen, Kirchardt, Langenbrettach, Lehrensteinsfeld, Löwenstein, Massenbachhausen, Möckmühl, Neckarsulm, Neudenau, Neuenstadt am Kocher, Obersulm, Oedheim, Offenau, Roigheim, Schwaigern, Siegelsbach, Untereisesheim, Weinsberg, Widdern, and Wüstenrot municipalities)
1998	171	Heilbronn	Heilbronn city; Landkreis Heilbronn district (only Bad Friedrichshall, Bad Rappenau, Bad Wimpfen, Eberstadt, Ellhofen, Eppingen, Erlenbach, Gemmingen, Gundelsheim, Hardthausen am Kocher, Ittlingen, Jagsthausen, Kirchardt, Langenbrettach, Lehrensteinsfeld, Löwenstein, Massenbachhausen, Möckmühl, Neckarsulm, Neudenau, Neuenstadt am Kocher, Obersulm, Oedheim, Offenau, Roigheim, Schwaigern, Siegelsbach, Untereisesheim, Weinsberg, Widdern, and Wüstenrot municipalities)
2002	268	Heilbronn	Heilbronn city; Landkreis Heilbronn district (only Bad Friedrichshall, Bad Rappenau, Bad Wimpfen, Eberstadt, Ellhofen, Eppingen, Erlenbach, Gemmingen, Gundelsheim, Hardthausen am Kocher, Ittlingen, Jagsthausen, Kirchardt, Langenbrettach, Lehrensteinsfeld, Löwenstein, Massenbachhausen, Möckmühl, Neckarsulm, Neudenau, Neuenstadt am Kocher, Obersulm, Oedheim, Offenau, Roigheim, Schwaigern, Siegelsbach, Untereisesheim, Weinsberg, Widdern, and Wüstenrot municipalities)
2005	268	Heilbronn	Heilbronn city; Landkreis Heilbronn district (only Bad Friedrichshall, Bad Rappenau, Bad Wimpfen, Eberstadt, Ellhofen, Eppingen, Erlenbach, Gemmingen, Gundelsheim, Hardthausen am Kocher, Ittlingen, Jagsthausen, Kirchardt, Langenbrettach, Lehrensteinsfeld, Löwenstein, Massenbachhausen, Möckmühl, Neckarsulm, Neudenau, Neuenstadt am Kocher, Obersulm, Oedheim, Offenau, Roigheim, Schwaigern, Siegelsbach, Untereisesheim, Weinsberg, Widdern, and Wüstenrot municipalities)
2009	267	Heilbronn	Heilbronn city; Landkreis Heilbronn district (only Bad Friedrichshall, Bad Rappenau, Bad Wimpfen, Eberstadt, Ellhofen, Eppingen, Erlenbach, Gemmingen, Gundelsheim, Hardthausen am Kocher, Ittlingen, Jagsthausen, Kirchardt, Langenbrettach, Lehrensteinsfeld, Löwenstein, Massenbachhausen, Möckmühl, Neckarsulm, Neudenau, Neuenstadt am Kocher, Obersulm, Oedheim, Offenau, Roigheim, Schwaigern, Siegelsbach, Untereisesheim, Weinsberg, Widdern, and Wüstenrot municipalities)
2013	267	Heilbronn	Heilbronn city; Landkreis Heilbronn district (only Bad Friedrichshall, Bad Rappenau, Bad Wimpfen, Eberstadt, Ellhofen, Eppingen, Erlenbach, Gemmingen, Gundelsheim, Hardthausen am Kocher, Ittlingen, Jagsthausen, Kirchardt, Langenbrettach, Lehrensteinsfeld, Löwenstein, Massenbachhausen, Möckmühl, Neckarsulm, Neudenau, Neuenstadt am Kocher, Obersulm, Oedheim, Offenau, Roigheim, Schwaigern, Siegelsbach, Untereisesheim, Weinsberg, Widdern, and Wüstenrot municipalities)
2017	267	Heilbronn	Heilbronn city; Landkreis Heilbronn district (only Bad Friedrichshall, Bad Rappenau, Bad Wimpfen, Eberstadt, Ellhofen, Eppingen, Erlenbach, Gemmingen, Gundelsheim, Hardthausen am Kocher, Ittlingen, Jagsthausen, Kirchardt, Langenbrettach, Lehrensteinsfeld, Löwenstein, Massenbachhausen, Möckmühl, Neckarsulm, Neudenau, Neuenstadt am Kocher, Obersulm, Oedheim, Offenau, Roigheim, Schwaigern, Siegelsbach, Untereisesheim, Weinsberg, Widdern, and Wüstenrot municipalities)
2021	267	Heilbronn	Heilbronn city; Landkreis Heilbronn district (only Bad Friedrichshall, Bad Rappenau, Bad Wimpfen, Eberstadt, Ellhofen, Eppingen, Erlenbach, Gemmingen, Gundelsheim, Hardthausen am Kocher, Ittlingen, Jagsthausen, Kirchardt, Langenbrettach, Lehrensteinsfeld, Löwenstein, Massenbachhausen, Möckmühl, Neckarsulm, Neudenau, Neuenstadt am Kocher, Obersulm, Oedheim, Offenau, Roigheim, Schwaigern, Siegelsbach, Untereisesheim, Weinsberg, Widdern, and Wüstenrot municipalities)
2025	267	Heilbronn	Heilbronn city; Landkreis Heilbronn district (only Bad Friedrichshall, Bad Rappenau, Bad Wimpfen, Eberstadt, Ellhofen, Eppingen, Erlenbach, Gemmingen, Gundelsheim, Hardthausen am Kocher, Ittlingen, Jagsthausen, Kirchardt, Langenbrettach, Lehrensteinsfeld, Löwenstein, Massenbachhausen, Möckmühl, Neckarsulm, Neudenau, Neuenstadt am Kocher, Obersulm, Oedheim, Offenau, Roigheim, Schwaigern, Siegelsbach, Untereisesheim, Weinsberg, Widdern, and Wüstenrot municipalities)

== Members ==
The constituency was first represented by Georg Kohl of the Free Democratic Party (FDP) from 1949 until his death in 1952. He was succeeded by fellow FDP member Adolf Mauk in a by-election. Mauk was re-elected in 1953 federal election. Karl Simpfendörfer of the Christian Democratic Union (CDU) won the constituency in 1957. Helmut Bazille of the Social Democratic Party (SPD) was elected in 1961 and served until 1969, when he was succeeded by fellow SPD member Erhard Eppler from 1969 to 1976. Egon Susset of the CDU was then representative from 1976 to 1998, followed by Thomas Strobl from 1998 to 2017. Alexander Throm was elected in 2017 and re-elected in 2021.

Election	Member	Party	%
1949	Georg Kohl	FDP	28.2
1952	Adolf Mauk	FDP	60.3
1953	Adolf Mauk	FDP	32.6
1957	Karl Simpfendörfer	CDU	35.2
1961	Helmut Bazille	SPD	38.5
1965	Helmut Bazille	SPD	38.1
1969	Erhard Eppler	SPD	46.9
1972	Erhard Eppler	SPD	50.5
1976	Egon Susset	CDU	47.8
1980	Egon Susset	CDU	46.3
1983	Egon Susset	CDU	52.4
1987	Egon Susset	CDU	46.8
1990	Egon Susset	CDU	46.9
1994	Egon Susset	CDU	45.1
1998	Thomas Strobl	CDU	43.8
2002	Thomas Strobl	CDU	49.2
2005	Thomas Strobl	CDU	50.3
2009	Thomas Strobl	CDU	44.2
2013	Thomas Strobl	CDU	51.4
2017	Alexander Throm	CDU	35.3
2021	Alexander Throm	CDU	27.8
2025	Alexander Throm	CDU	35.0

== Election results ==
=== 2025 election ===
Federal election (2025): Heilbronn
Notes:	Blue background denotes the winner of the electorate vote. Pink background denotes a candidate elected from their party list. Yellow background denotes an electorate win by a list member, or other incumbent. A ✓ or ✗ denotes status of any incumbent, win or lose respectively.						
Party	Candidate	Votes	%	±%	Party votes	%	±%
CDU	✓ Alexander Throm	67,516	35.0	▲7.2	56,936	29.4	▲5.5
AfD	Jürgen Kögel	48,360	25.1	▲12.3	49,239	25.5	▲12.3
SPD	Jens Schäfer	29,914	15.5	▼8.8	27,713	14.3	▼8.3
Greens	Jonathan Ebert	16,637	8.6	▼4.1	18,307	9.5	▼3.5
Left	Andreas Mössinger	11,484	6.0	▲3.6	11.923	6.2	▲3.3
FW	Jacqueline Plath	4,328	2.2	▼0.3	2,649	1.4	▼0.4
FDP	Michael Link	9,853	5.1	▼8.6	12,027	6.2	▼10.0
dieBasis	Alexander Staengle	1,915	1.0	▼0.9	1,003	0.5	▼1.1
Tierschutzpartei					1,977	1.0	▼0.1
PARTEI				▼1.7	927	0.5	▼0.6
Team Todenhöfer							▼0.6
Pirates							▼0.2
Volt	Patrick Fischer	1,99	1.0		1,239	0.6	▲0.3
ÖDP					370	0.2	▼0.1
Bündnis C					359	0.2	▼0.1
BD					304	0.2	
Humanists				▼0.3			▼0.2
Gesundheitsforschung							▼0.1
Bürgerbewegung							▼0.5
BSW					8,391	4.3	
MLPD	Peter Rügner	313	0.2	0.0	86	0.0	0.0
Informal votes		1,705			1,256		
Total valid votes		193,001			193,450		
Turnout		194,706	81.6	▲5.7			
CDU hold	Majority			▲7.2			

=== 2021 election ===
Federal election (2021): Heilbronn
Notes:	Blue background denotes the winner of the electorate vote. Pink background denotes a candidate elected from their party list. Yellow background denotes an electorate win by a list member, or other incumbent. A ✓ or ✗ denotes status of any incumbent, win or lose respectively.						
Party	Candidate	Votes	%	±%	Party votes	%	±%
CDU	✓ Alexander Throm	50,299	27.8	▼7.5	43,325	23.9	▼8.1
SPD	Josip Juratovic	43,887	24.3	▲1.1	40,961	22.6	▲4.9
FDP	Michael Georg Link	24,748	13.7	▲4.1	29,386	16.2	▲3.2
AfD	Franziska Gminder	23,093	12.8	▼2.8	23,828	13.2	▼3.3
Greens	Isabell Steidel	23,018	12.7	▲4.6	23,476	13.0	▲2.6
FW	Uwe Basler	4,595	2.5	▲1.5	3,278	1.8	▲1.1
Left	Konrad Wanner	4,237	2.3	▼2.3	5,137	2.8	▼2.9
dieBasis	Dirk Piper	3,354	1.9		2,857	1.6	
Tierschutzpartei					2,076	1.1	▲0.5
PARTEI	Milena Götz	2,988	1.7	▲0.5	2,041	1.1	▲0.3
Team Todenhöfer					1,145	0.6	
Pirates					605	0.3	▼0.1
Volt					529	0.3	
ÖDP					527	0.3	▼0.1
Bündnis C					437	0.2	
NPD					314	0.2	▼0.3
Humanists	Markus Schneider	497	0.3		272	0.1	
Gesundheitsforschung					250	0.1	
Bürgerbewegung					217	0.1	
DiB					140	0.1	0.0
MLPD	Peter Rügner	225	0.1	0.0	106	0.1	0.0
Bündnis 21					73	0.0	
LKR					46	0.0	
DKP					28	0.0	0.0
Informal votes		1,863			1,749		
Total valid votes		180,941			181,055		
Turnout		182,804	75.9	▼0.7			
CDU hold	Majority	6,412	3.5	▼8.6			

=== 2017 election ===
Federal election (2017): Heilbronn
Notes:	Blue background denotes the winner of the electorate vote. Pink background denotes a candidate elected from their party list. Yellow background denotes an electorate win by a list member, or other incumbent. A ✓ or ✗ denotes status of any incumbent, win or lose respectively.						
Party	Candidate	Votes	%	±%	Party votes	%	±%
CDU	Alexander Throm	64,591	35.3	▼16.1	58,755	32.1	▼13.7
SPD	Josip Juratovic	42,455	23.2	▼3.9	32,489	17.7	▼4.4
AfD	Jürgen Kögel	28,575	15.6		30,089	16.4	▲11.0
FDP	Michael Georg Link	17,566	9.6	▲6.0	23,872	13.0	▲6.7
Greens	Thomas Fick	14,920	8.1	▲0.7	19,016	10.4	▲1.8
Left	Konrad Wanner	8,448	4.6	▲0.2	10,520	5.7	▲1.0
PARTEI	Niclas Keicher	2,167	1.2		1,530	0.8	
FW	Alfred Burkhardt	1,896	1.0		1,281	0.7	▲0.2
Tierschutzpartei					1,236	0.7	▼0.1
NPD					835	0.5	▼1.1
ÖDP	Bernhard Keil	1,210	0.7	▼0.2	758	0.4	0.0
Pirates					728	0.4	▼1.8
DM					470	0.3	
Tierschutzallianz					442	0.2	
Independent	Werner Marquardt	405	0.2				
Independent	Eduard Martin	327	0.2				
Menschliche Welt					271	0.1	
V-Partei³					226	0.1	
DiB					222	0.1	
BGE					200	0.1	
MLPD	Rita Renner	302	0.2	▼0.1	181	0.1	0.0
DIE RECHTE	Sascha Krolzig	248	0.1		141	0.1	
DKP					24	0.0	
Informal votes		2,595			2,419		
Total valid votes		183,110			183,286		
Turnout		185,705	76.6	▲4.7			
CDU hold	Majority	22,136	12.1	▼12.2			

=== 2013 election ===
Federal election (2013): Heilbronn
Notes:	Blue background denotes the winner of the electorate vote. Pink background denotes a candidate elected from their party list. Yellow background denotes an electorate win by a list member, or other incumbent. A ✓ or ✗ denotes status of any incumbent, win or lose respectively.						
Party	Candidate	Votes	%	±%	Party votes	%	±%
CDU	✓ Thomas Strobl	87,777	51.4	▲7.1	78,544	45.8	▲10.9
SPD	Josip Juratovic	46,231	27.1	▲2.0	37,933	22.1	▲0.9
Greens	Ulrich Schneider	12,771	7.5	▼1.3	14,662	8.5	▼1.6
Left	Heinz Deininger	7,554	4.4	▼2.0	8,138	4.7	▼2.6
FDP	Michael Georg Link	6,178	3.6	▼8.4	10,927	6.4	▼12.8
AfD					9,271	5.4	
Pirates	Remy Patzelt	4,599	2.7		3,789	2.2	▲0.3
NPD	Matthias Brodbeck	3,905	2.3	▲0.1	2,672	1.6	0.0
Tierschutzpartei					1,250	0.7	0.0
FW					771	0.4	
ÖDP	Guido Klamt	1,469	0.9	▼0.1	731	0.4	▼0.2
REP					715	0.4	▼0.7
RENTNER					544	0.3	
PBC					432	0.3	▼0.3
BIG					322	0.2	
Volksabstimmung					308	0.2	0.0
PRO					261	0.2	
Party of Reason					166	0.1	
MLPD	Peter Rügner	403	0.2	0.0	126	0.1	0.0
BüSo					28	0.0	0.0
Informal votes		2,885			2,182		
Total valid votes		170,887			171,590		
Turnout		173,772	71.9	▲1.8			
CDU hold	Majority	41,546	24.3	▲5.1			

=== 2009 election ===
Federal election (2009): Heilbronn
Notes:	Blue background denotes the winner of the electorate vote. Pink background denotes a candidate elected from their party list. Yellow background denotes an electorate win by a list member, or other incumbent. A ✓ or ✗ denotes status of any incumbent, win or lose respectively.						
Party	Candidate	Votes	%	±%	Party votes	%	±%
CDU	✓ Thomas Strobl	73,308	44.2	▼6.1	57,889	34.8	▼4.7
SPD	Josip Juratovic	41,484	25.0	▼8.6	35,331	21.3	▼11.1
FDP	Michael Georg Link	19,924	12.0	▲7.6	31,932	19.2	▲7.6
Greens	Ulrich Schneider	14,594	8.8	▲3.2	16,917	10.2	▲2.7
Left	Hasso Ehinger	10,693	6.5	▲3.1	12,256	7.4	▲3.5
Pirates					3,246	2.0	
NPD	Alexander Scholl	3,657	2.2	▼0.1	2,622	1.6	▼0.1
REP					1,853	1.1	▼0.3
Tierschutzpartei					1,131	0.7	
ÖDP	Rainer Graf	1,656	1.0		1,040	0.6	
PBC					912	0.5	0.0
Volksabstimmung					358	0.2	
DIE VIOLETTEN					264	0.2	
MLPD	Peter Rügner	372	0.2	▼0.1	186	0.1	0.0
DVU					160	0.1	
BüSo					70	0.0	0.0
ADM					62	0.0	
Informal votes		3,239			2,698		
Total valid votes		165,688			166,229		
Turnout		168,927	70.1	▼7.1			
CDU hold	Majority	31,824	19.2	▲2.5			

=== 2005 election ===
Federal election (2005): Heilbronn
Notes:	Blue background denotes the winner of the electorate vote. Pink background denotes a candidate elected from their party list. Yellow background denotes an electorate win by a list member, or other incumbent. A ✓ or ✗ denotes status of any incumbent, win or lose respectively.						
Party	Candidate	Votes	%	±%	Party votes	%	±%
CDU	✓ Thomas Strobl	90,333	50.3	▲0.9	71,134	39.5	▼4.0
SPD	Josip Juratovic	60,353	33.6	▼6.0	58,244	32.4	▼3.2
Greens	Ulrich Schneider	10,059	5.6	▲1.3	13,540	7.5	▼0.7
FDP	Michael Link	7,918	4.4	▼0.4	20,941	11.6	▲3.9
Left	Hasso Ehinger	6,082	3.4	▲2.4	6,904	3.8	▲3.0
NPD	Lars Käppler	4,157	2.3		2,980	1.7	▲1.3
REP					2,622	1.5	▼0.2
Familie					1,357	0.8	
PBC					994	0.6	▲0.1
GRAUEN					848	0.5	▲0.3
MLPD	Peter Rügner	550	0.3		273	0.2	
BüSo					118	0.1	
Informal votes		3,915			3,412		
Total valid votes		179,452			179,955		
Turnout		183,367	77.1	▼2.9			
CDU hold	Majority	29,980	16.7				
