= Neckarsulm (electoral district) =

State electoral district of Germany

20: Neckarsulm
- Electoral district for the Landtag of Baden-Württemberg
- Heilbronn in 2026
- District: Heilbronn
- Electorate: 114,464 (2026)
- Major settlements: Bad Friedrichshall, Bad Wimpfen, Eberstadt, Ellhofen, Erlenbach, Gundelsheim, Hardthausen am Kocher, Jagsthausen, Langenbrettach, Lehrensteinsfeld, Löwenstein, Möckmühl, Neckarsulm, Neudenau, Neuenstadt am Kocher, Obersulm, Oedheim, Offenau, Roigheim, Untereisesheim, Weinsberg, Widdern, and Wüstenrot

Current electoral district
- Party: CDU
- Member: Isabell Huber

Neckarsulm is an electoral constituency (German: Wahlkreis) represented in the Landtag of Baden-Württemberg. Since 2026, it has elected one member via first-past-the-post voting. Voters cast a second vote under which additional seats are allocated proportionally state-wide. Under the constituency numbering system, it is designated as constituency 20. It is wholly within the district of Heilbronn.

== Geography ==
The constituency includes the municipalities of Bad Friedrichshall, Bad Wimpfen, Eberstadt, Ellhofen, Erlenbach, Gundelsheim, Hardthausen am Kocher, Jagsthausen, Langenbrettach, Lehrensteinsfeld, Löwenstein, Möckmühl, Neckarsulm, Neudenau, Neuenstadt am Kocher, Obersulm, Oedheim, Offenau, Roigheim, Untereisesheim, Weinsberg, Widdern, and Wüstenrot, within the district of Heilbronn.

There were 114,464 eligible voters in 2026.

== Members ==
=== First mandate ===
Both prior to and since the electoral reforms for the 2026 election, the winner of the plurality of the vote (first-past-the-post) in every constituency won the first mandate.

Election	Member	Party	%
1976	Hermann Mühlbeyer	CDU	
1980	Hermann Mühlbeyer	CDU	
1984	Hermann Mühlbeyer	CDU	
1988	Hermann Mühlbeyer	CDU	
1992	Hermann Mühlbeyer	CDU	
1996	Hermann Mühlbeyer	CDU	
2001	Bernhard Lasotta	CDU	43.3
2006	Bernhard Lasotta	CDU	46.4
2011	Bernhard Lasotta	CDU	40.7
2016	Bernhard Lasotta	CDU	25.8
Jan 2019	Isabell Huber	CDU	25.8
2021	Armin Waldbüßer	Grüne	27.4
2026	Isabell Huber	CDU	34.4

=== Second mandate ===
Prior to the electoral reforms for the 2026 election, the seats in the state parliament were allocated proportionately amongst parties which received more than 5% of valid votes across the state. The seats that were won proportionally for parties that did not win as many first mandates as seats they were entitled to, were allocated to their candidates which received the highest proportion of the vote in their respective constituencies. This meant that following some elections, a constituency would have one or more members elected under a second mandate.

Prior to 2011, these second mandates were allocated to the party candidates who got the greatest number of votes, whilst from 2011-2021, these were allocated according to percentage share of the vote.

Prior to 1984, there were no second mandate candidates elected from this constituency.

Election	Member	Party	Member	Party	Member	Party
1984	Alfred Schöffler	SPD				
1988	Alfred Schöffler	SPD				
1992	Alfred Schöffler	SPD				
1996	Alfred Schöffler	SPD	Alfred Dagenbach	REP		
2001	Reinhold Gall	SPD				
2006	Reinhold Gall	SPD				
2011	Reinhold Gall	SPD				
2016	Reinhold Gall	SPD	Carola Wolle	AfD		
2021	Klaus Ranger	SPD	Carola Wolle	AfD	Isabell Huber	CDU

== Election results ==
=== 2026 election ===
State election (2026): Neckarsulm
Notes:	Blue background denotes the winner of the electorate vote. Pink background denotes a candidate elected from their party list. Yellow background denotes an electorate win by a list member, or other incumbent. A ✓ or ✗ denotes status of any incumbent, win or lose respectively.						
Party	Candidate	Votes	%	±%	Party votes	%	±%
CDU	Isabell Huber	27,065	34.4	▲9.5	23,242	29.5	▲4.5
AfD	Carola Wolle	19,288	24.5	▲10.6	19,528	24.8	▲10.9
Greens	Sibylle Riegger-Gnamm	13,919	17.7	▼9.6	19,192	24.4	▼3.0
SPD	Klaus Ranger	7,416	9.4	▼3.2	4,799	6.1	▼6.6
FDP	Alexander Hampo	2,801	3.6	▼6.4	3,257	4.1	▼5.8
Left	Florian Vollert	2,796	3.6	▲0.5	2,481	3.2	▲0.1
FW	Jacqueline Plath	2,544	3.2	▲0.5	1,922	2.4	▼0.7
BSW	Irhad Bačić	1,311	1.7		1,329	1.7	
APT					653	0.8	
Volt	Anita Schallenberg	965	1.2	▲0.7	603	0.8	▲0.2
PARTEI					373	0.5	▼1.3
dieBasis					334	0.4	▼0.5
ÖDP	Ute Hermann	481	0.6	▼0.1	197	0.3	▼0.5
Bündnis C					162	0.2	
Values					157	0.2	
Pensioners					155	0.2	
Team Todenhöfer					151	0.2	
Verjüngungsforschung					69	0.1	
PdF					55	0.1	
KlimalisteBW					38	0.0	
Humanists					27	0.0	
Informal votes		655			517		
Total valid votes		78,586			78,724		
Turnout		79,241	69.2	▲4.7			
CDU gain from Greens	Majority	7,777	9.9				

=== 2021 election ===
State election (2026): Neckarsulm
Party	Candidate	Votes	%	±%
Greens	Armin Walbüßer	19,611	27.4	▲3.6
CDU	Isabell Huber	17,905	25.0	▼0.8
AfD	Carola Wolle	9,982	13.9	▼4.8
SPD	Klaus Ranger	9,078	12.7	▼4.9
FDP	Alexander Hampo	7,112	9.9	▲1.8
FW	Jürgen Braun	2,255	3.1	
Left	Jasmin Ellsässer	2,167	3.0	▲0.5
PARTEI	Daniel Kollmus	1,278	1.8	
WiR2020	Saskia Otto	700	1.0	
dieBasis	Bernhard Möhler	629	0.9	
ÖDP	Bernhard Vogel	544	0.8	▼0.1
Volt	Andreas Zwickl	412	0.6	
Majority		1,706	2.4	
Rejected ballots		655	0.9	▼0.3
Turnout		72,328	64.5	▼6.0
Registered electors		112,091		
Greens gain from CDU		Swing		

== See also ==
- Politics of Baden-Württemberg
- Landtag of Baden-Württemberg
