= Kirchardt =

- Municipality
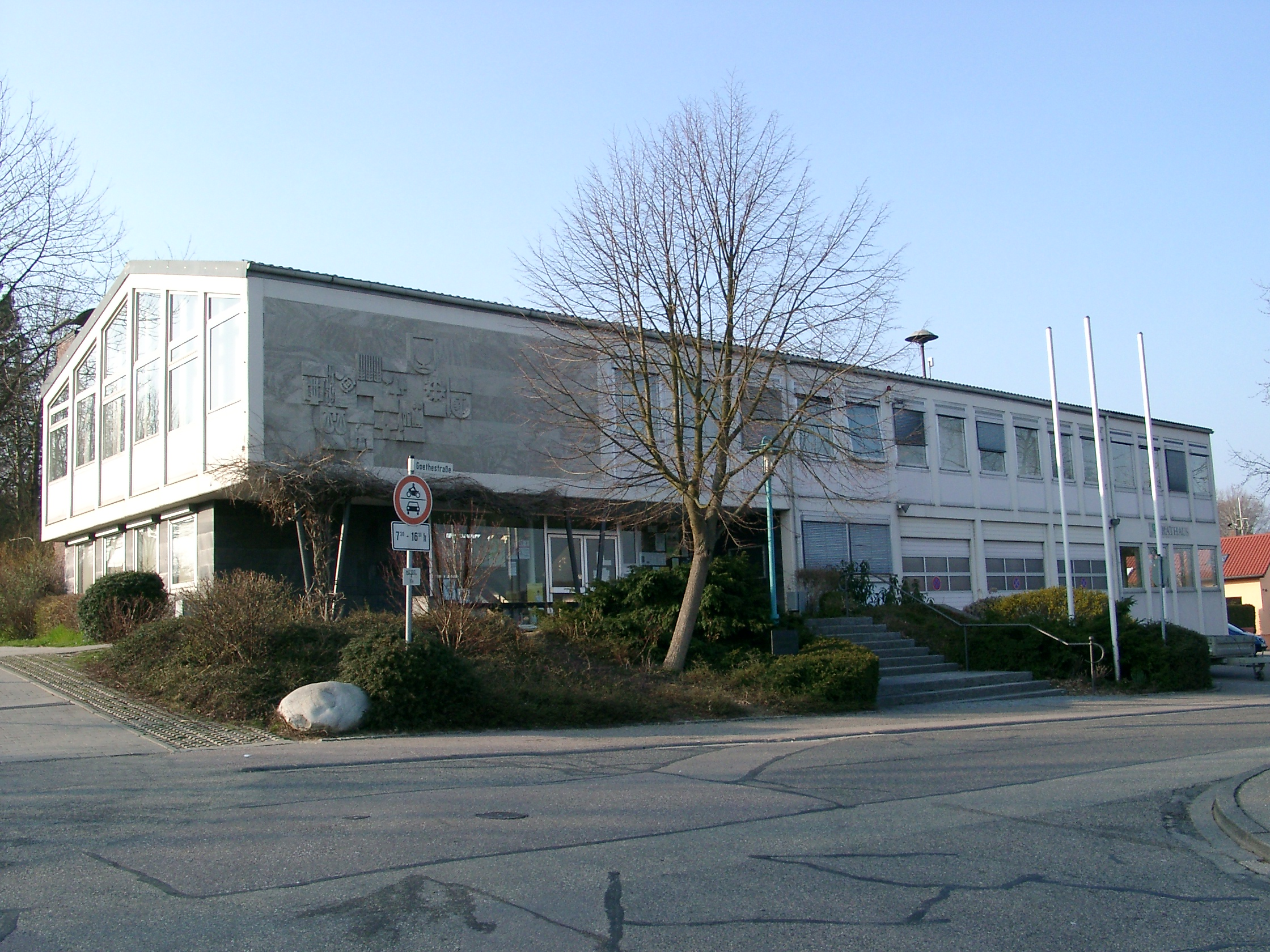
- Town hall

- Coat of arms

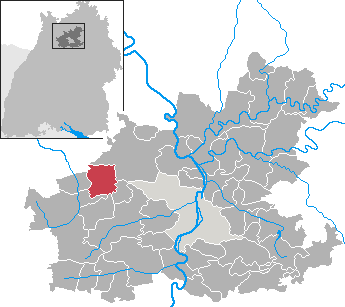
- Location of Kirchardt within Heilbronn district
- Interactive map of Kirchardt
- Location within Germany Location within Baden-Württemberg
- Coordinates: 49°12′N 8°59′E
- Country: Germany
- State: Baden-Württemberg
- Admin. region: Stuttgart
- District: Heilbronn
- Subdivisions: 3

Government
  - Mayor (2024–32): Gerd Kreiter

Area
  - Total: 21.50 km^{2} (8.30 sq mi)
- Elevation: 227 m (745 ft)

Population (2025-12-31)
  - Total: 5,944
  - Density: 276.5/km^{2} (716.0/sq mi)
- Time zone: UTC+01:00 (CET)
  - Summer (DST): UTC+02:00 (CEST)
- Postal codes: 74912
- Dialling codes: 07266
- Vehicle registration: HN
- Website: www.kirchardt.de

Kirchardt (German: [ˈkɪʁçaʁt]) is a town in the district of Heilbronn in Baden-Württemberg, Germany.

== Geography ==
Kirchardt is in the north-west of Heilbronn and belongs to the outskirts of the Stuttgart Metropolitan Region. Starting in the north and proceeding in a clockwise direction, the neighbouring towns and cities of Kirchardt are Bad Rappenau, Massenbachhausen, Gemmingen, Eppingen, Ittlingen (all in the Heilbronn region) and Sinsheim (in the Rhein-Neckar region). Kirchardt is part of a unified community authority which also consists of Bad Rappenau and Siegelsbach. Kirchardt consists of the core community of Kirchardt proper, plus the peripheral communities of Berwangen and Bockschaft. Previously there was another community in the town, Lauterstein, but it was later absorbed into Kirchardt proper. The town of Kirchardt has approximately 5,500 inhabitants, of which 3,700 live in Kirchardt itself, with 1,400 in Berwangen and 400 people in Bockschaft.

== History ==
=== Early settlement by Celts, Romans and Alemanni ===
The first signs of human activity in the area date from the Bronze Age, but the earliest settlement to be detected so far was Celtic, from the sixth century B.C.E. From 90 to 260 C.E., the occupying Romans constructed streets and buildings in various parts of civitas alisinensis (the area which would later become Elsenzgau) to support the Neckar-Odenwald limes. A villa rustica from that era was uncovered in Kirchardt in 1832, as well as a farmstead with a deep well. An important Roman road ran through what is now Berwangen, where a Jupiter Column was also found. With the withdrawal of the Romans from the east of Rhine and the concurrent arrival of the Alemanni, the buildings crumbled completely.

=== First mention in the Codex Aureus of Lorsch, and the meaning of the town name ===
Kirchardt and its constituent communities, like many cities and towns in Northern Württemberg and North Baden, was first mentioned by name in the Codex Aureus of Lorsch in 791. A nun by the name of Egilrat recorded the transfer of a farm with associated land in villa Kyrih-Hart to the ownership of Lorsch Abbey. The name is a unique one for an uninhabited area, and means perhaps "church in the wood" or "forest belonging to a church", but more likely indicates "the forest where the red kites live". (Note: Kürweihen is the old German name for "red kite" - the modern name being Rotmilan.) The first mentions of the other two communities in modern-day Kirchardt also occur in the codex, both in connection with donations to the abbey, Berwangen being recorded in 793, and Bockschaft in 829. The appellation villa denoted that Kirchardt was then a small community not long settled. As the earliest settled areas in Kirchardt lie on the old northern boundary with the district of Berwangen as well as the source of the Birkenbach stream, it is likely that Kirchardt was settled from the older and formerly more significant Berwangen.

In the Early Middle Ages there was a road (then called the "High Road") connecting Heilbronn and Heidelberg which ran approximately on the line of the current Bundesstraße 39 between Heilbronn and Sinsheim. Kirchardt lay somewhat away from this historic highway, on the edge of the Krachigau-Hügel region, and was surrounded by fields, meadows, and oak forests. For centuries the population was made up exclusively of farmers, who tilled the fields and raised pigs. Acorns were an important source of fodder for the pigs, leading to the inclusion on the town crest of a single acorn from 1769 onwards. The name of the town from the thirteenth to the sixteenth century was Kirchart (with differing spellings), then Kirhart in the seventeenth and eighteenth centuries, before settling back on Kirchardt in the nineteenth century.

== Demographics ==
Population development:

Year	Inhabitants
2012	5,450
2013	5,522
2014	5,634
2015	5,649
2016	5,738
2017	5,834
2018	5,921
2019	5,997
2020	6,022
2021	5,994
