= Isabell Huber =

German politician (born 1987)

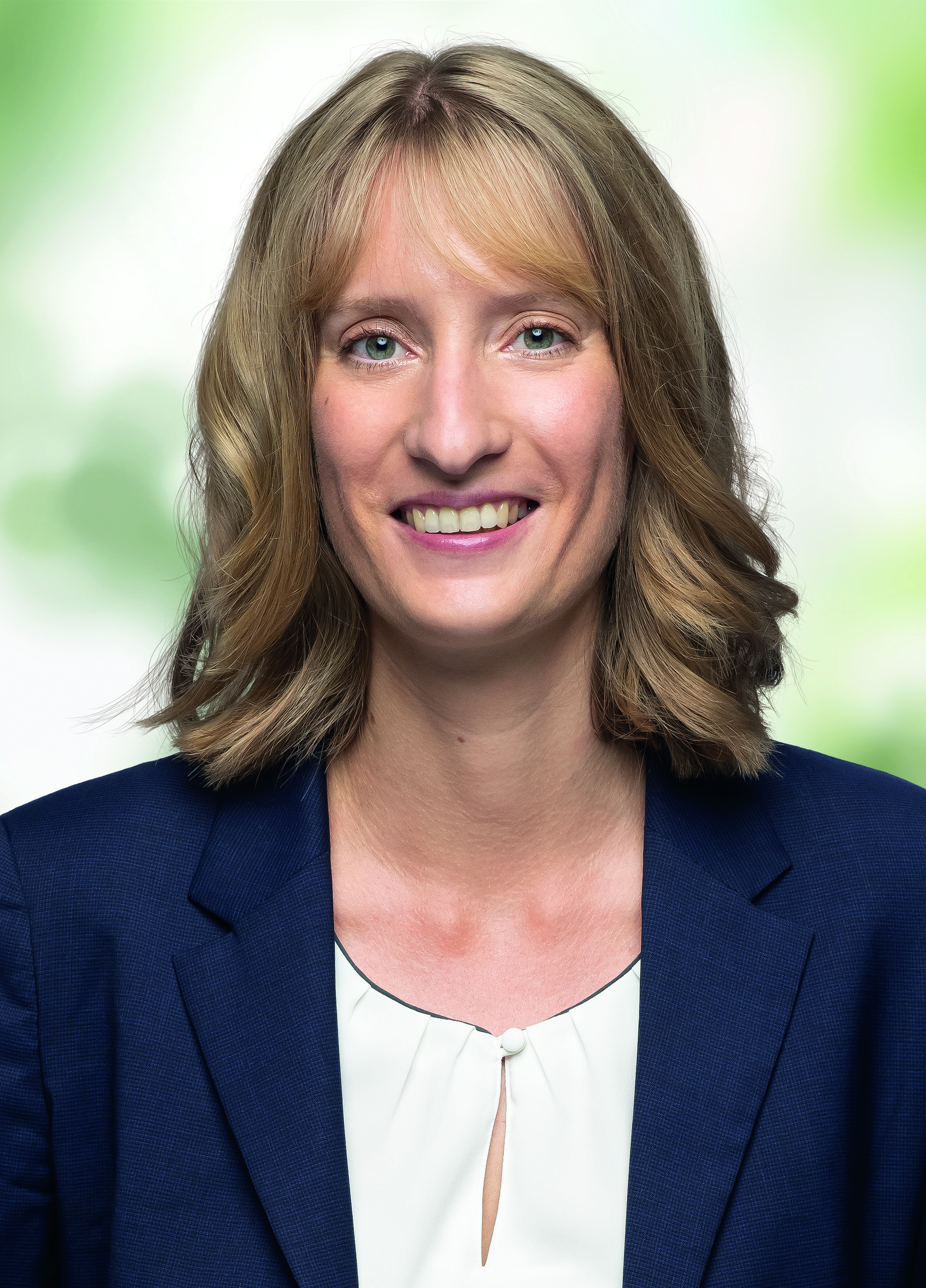
- Huber in 2021

Member of the Landtag of Baden-Württemberg
- Incumbent
- Assumed office 22 January 2019
- Preceded by: Bernhard Lasotta
- Constituency: Neckarsulm

Personal details
- Born: 27 August 1987 (age 38) Heilbronn
- Party: Christian Democratic Union (since 2009)

Isabell Huber (born 27 August 1987 in Heilbronn) is a German politician serving as a member of the Landtag of Baden-Württemberg since 2019. From 2021 to 2023, she served as secretary general of the CDU Baden-Württemberg. Since March 2024, Huber has been the honorary mayor of the village of Wüstenrot. She was re-elected in the 2026 state election.
