= Alexander Throm =

German politician

Alexander Throm MdB
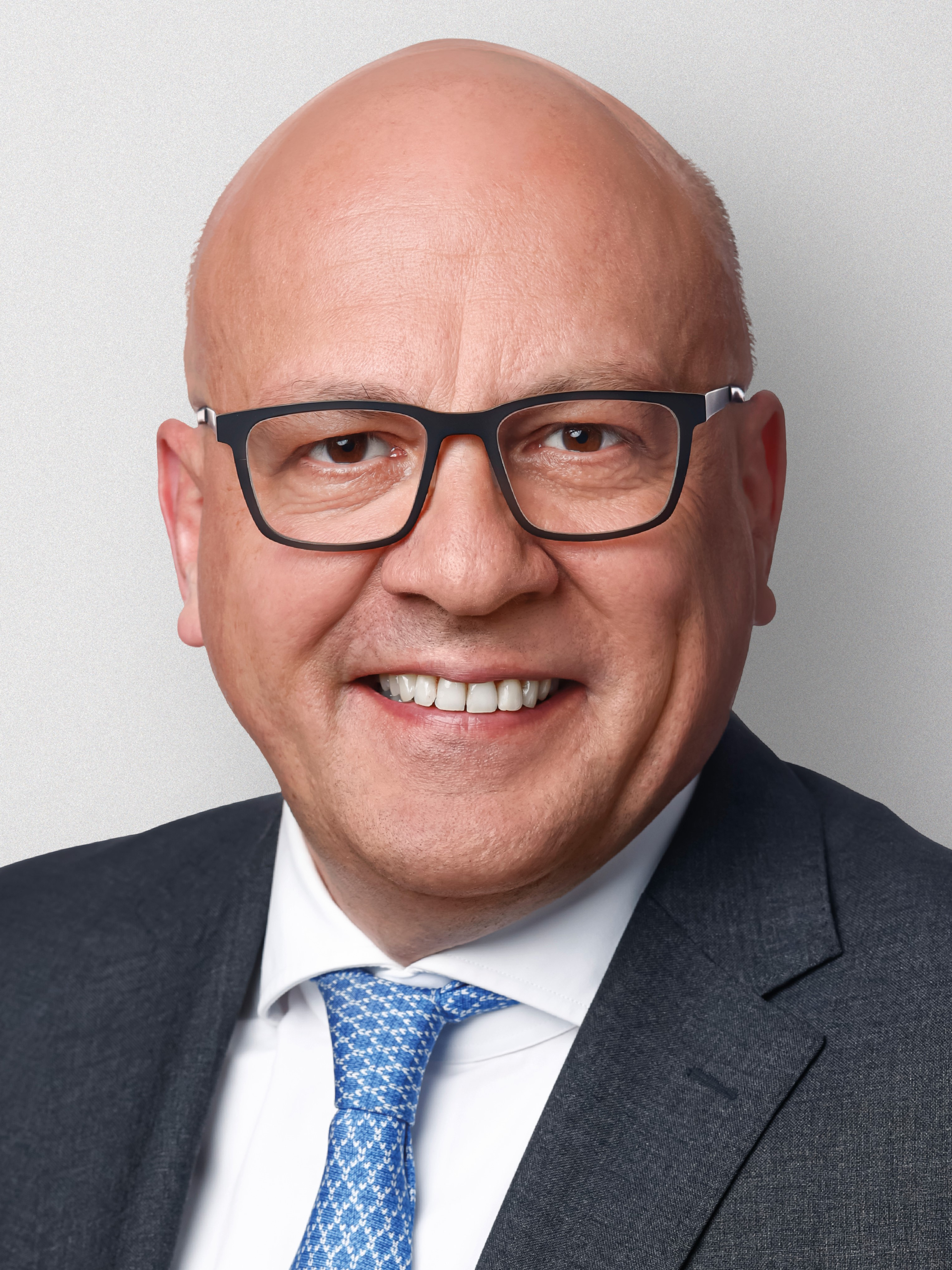
- Throm in 2021

Member of the Bundestag; for Heilbronn
- Incumbent
- Assumed office 24 October 2017
- Preceded by: Thomas Strobl

Personal details
- Born: 8 September 1968 (age 57) Heilbronn, West Germany (now Germany)
- Party: Christian Democratic Union
- Education: University of Mannheim

Alexander Throm (born 8 September 1968 in Heilbronn) is a German lawyer and politician of the Christian Democratic Union (CDU) who has been serving as a member of the Bundestag (Germany's national parliament) from the state of Baden-Württemberg, representing the Heilbronn electoral district, as a direct candidate since 2017. He was previously a member of the State Parliament of Baden-Württemberg from 2011 to 2016.

== Education and career ==
Throm attended the Silcherschule (elementary school) and the Justinus-Kerner-Gymnasium in Heilbronn and graduated from the Gustav-von-Schmoller-Schule in Heilbronn in 1988. He completed his law studies at the University of Mannheim in 1993 with the First State Examination. His legal clerkship at Heilbronn District Court was followed by the Second State Examination in 1995. He then worked as an associate and later as a partner in a Heilbronn law firm. In 2001, he founded the law firm THSB - Throm, Hauser, Strobl, von Berlichingen - with Thomas Strobl and several partners in Heilbronn. Throm is a specialist lawyer for construction and architectural law, employment law and commercial law.

== Political career ==
From 2011 until 2016, Throm was a member of the State Parliament of Baden-Württemberg, where he served on the Committee on Internal Affairs and the Committee on European Affairs.

On 19 November 2016, the CDU Heilbronn nominated him as a candidate for the 2017 Bundestag election in the Heilbronn electoral district (267) as the successor to Thomas Strobl. In the election to the 19th German Bundestag, he won the direct mandate with 27.8 percent of the first votes and has been a member of the German Bundestag ever since.

The CDU/CSU parliamentary group sent Throm to the 19th Bundestag as a full member and group coordinator of the Committee on Internal Affairs and Community as well as a full member of the Committee on the Scrutiny of Elections, Immunity and the Rules of Procedure (since 2019). Alexander Throm was also a deputy member of the Committee on Economic Cooperation and Development, the Committee on Construction, Housing, Urban Development and Local Authorities and the Committee on Legal Affairs and Consumer Protection. From 26 September 2019, until its conclusion, Throm was a full member of the 1st Committee of Inquiry of the 19th legislative period of the German Bundestag into the 2016 Berlin truck attack on 19 December 2016.

In the 2021 Bundestag election, he was able to defend his direct mandate with 27.8 percent of the first votes. In the 20th Bundestag, Alexander Throm is a full member of the Committee on Internal Affairs and Community, where he serves as the spokesperson for internal affairs and community of the CDU/CSU parliamentary group.

In the negotiations to form a Grand Coalition between the Christian Democrats (CDU together with the Bavarian CSU) under the leadership of Friedrich Merz and the Social Democratic Party (SPD) following the 2025 German elections, Throm was part of the CDU/CSU delegation in the working group on domestic policy, legal affairs, migration and integration, led by Günter Krings, Andrea Lindholz and Dirk Wiese.

== Other activities ==
- Südwestdeutsche Salzwerke AG (SWS AG), Member of the supervisory board (until August 2019)
- Kreissparkasse Heilbronn, Member of the Board of Directors (until April 2022)
- THW Landesvereinigung Baden-Württemberg e.V., President (since December 2023)

== Political positions ==
Ahead of the 2021 national elections, Throm endorsed Markus Söder as the Christian Democrats' joint candidate to succeed Chancellor Angela Merkel.

In August 2024, Throm supported a halt of asylum migration at German borders.

== Personal life ==
Alexander Throm has been married since 1996 and has a son and a daughter. He lives with his family in Heilbronn.
