= Reichert =

Reichert is a surname. Notable people with the surname include:

- Alexander Julius Reichert (1859–1939), German entomologist
- Benjamin Reichert (born 1983), German former professional football player and co-founder of the SK Gaming e-sports clan
- Craig Reichert (born 1974), Canadian former professional ice hockey player
- Dan Reichert (born 1976), American professional baseball pitcher and later pitching coach
- Dave Reichert (born 1950), American politician, U.S. Representative from Washington State
- Don Reichert (1932–2013), Canadian painter, photographer and digital media artist
- Heinrich Reichert (1949–2019), Swiss neurobiologist
- Karl Bogislaus Reichert (1811–1883), German anatomist
- Kittens Reichert (1910–1990), American child actress in silent films
- Manfred Reichert (1940-2010), German football defender
- Marcus Reichert (1948–2022), American painter, poet, author, photographer, and film writer/director
- Maureen Reichert (born 1934), Zimbabwean sport shooter
- Mickey Zucker Reichert (born 1962), American fantasy fiction author
- Nathan Reichert, American politician; Iowa State Representative 2005–2011
- Ossi Reichert (1925–2006), German Alpine skier
- Pete Reichert, American bassist with rock band Rocket from the Crypt at various times from 1990 to present
- Peter Reichert (born 1961), German former footballer
- Robert Reichert (born 1948), American politician, Mayor of Macon, Georgia
- Stephen Joseph Reichert (born 1943), American Roman Catholic archbishop
- Tanja Reichert (born 1976), Canadian actress
- Tim Reichert (born 1979), German professional footballer and co-founder of the SK Gaming e-sports clan

== See also ==
- Reichert, Oklahoma, an unincorporated community in Le Flore County, Oklahoma
- Reichert value, an indicator of how much volatile fatty acid can be extracted from fat through saponification
- Reicherts, similar name
