= Roigheim =

- Municipality
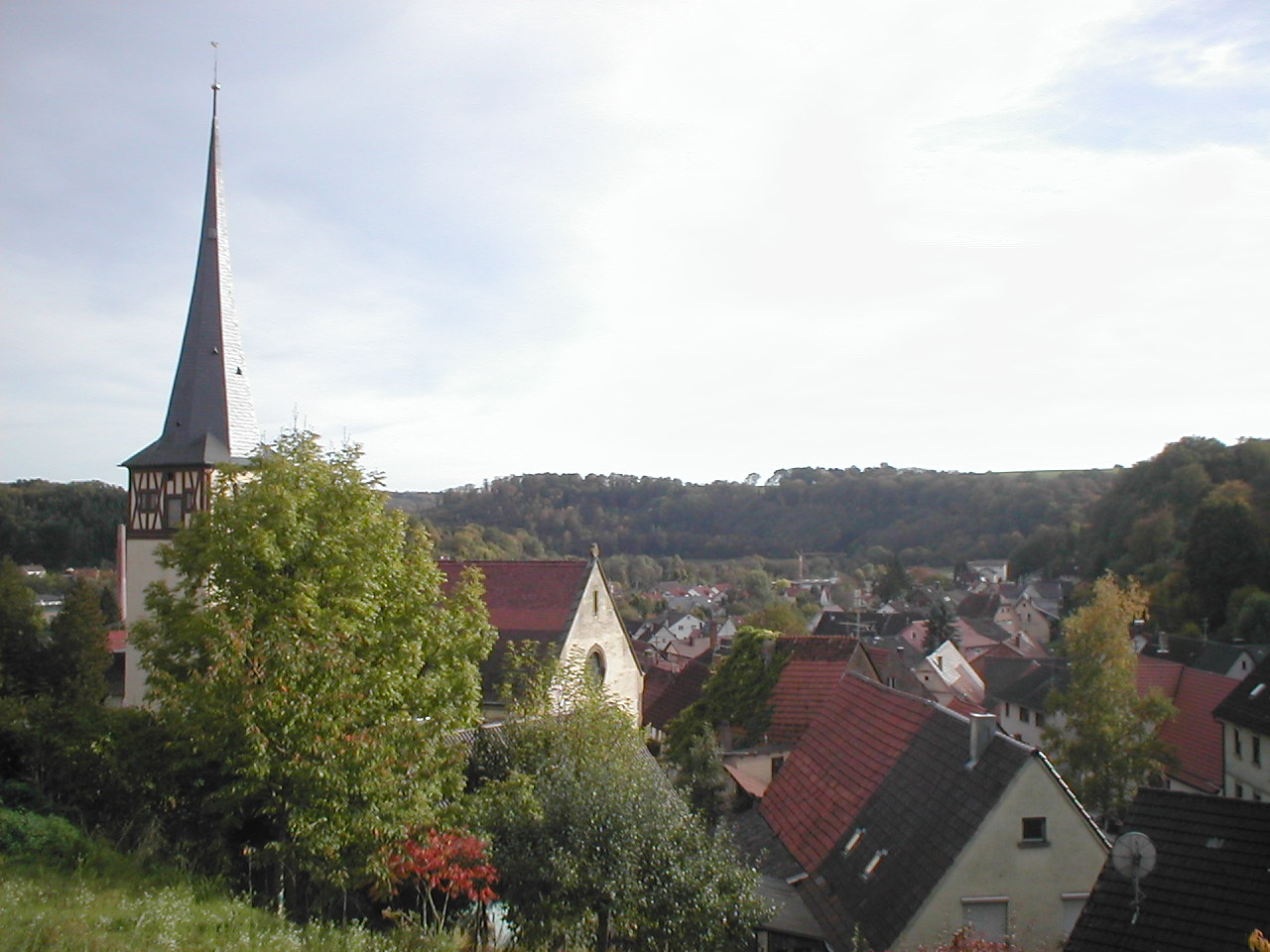

- Coat of arms

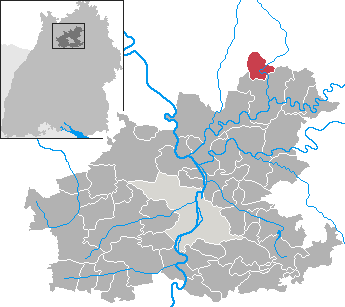
- Location of Roigheim within Heilbronn district
- Interactive map of Roigheim
- Location within Germany Location within Baden-Württemberg
- Coordinates: 49°21′52″N 9°20′24″E
- Country: Germany
- State: Baden-Württemberg
- Admin. region: Stuttgart
- District: Heilbronn

Government
  - Mayor (2019–27): Michael Grimm

Area
  - Total: 14.01 km^{2} (5.41 sq mi)
- Elevation: 220 m (720 ft)

Population (2025-12-31)
  - Total: 1,482
  - Density: 105.8/km^{2} (274.0/sq mi)
- Time zone: UTC+01:00 (CET)
  - Summer (DST): UTC+02:00 (CEST)
- Postal codes: 74255
- Dialling codes: 06298
- Vehicle registration: HN
- Website: www.roigheim.de

Roigheim (German pronunciation: [ˈʁɔʏkhaɪm]) is a small municipality in Southwest Germany, in Heilbronn County, situated along the Seckach river. With approximately 1,400 inhabitants, Roigheim is the smallest independent community in the German state (Bundesland) Baden-Württemberg. It is also the home of Pucaro Elektro-Isolierstoffe GmbH.

== History ==
Archeologists have found remains that date back to the Stone Age. The first proof of a settlement comes from the Roman Empire at around 150 AD. The first time Roigheim was mentioned in a chronicle was in 1110 as Rohinkheim. In 1287 the small village became part of the area of the duke of Hohenlohe and only in 1504 it was bequeathed to Württemberg. It changed hands again in 1521 when it was given to the bishop of Würzburg. On 10 May 1719 there was a devastating fire in which 115 houses burned down. During most of its early history, the majority of the population was working the many farms. The moderate climate allowed the farming on the surrounding hillsides. In the 19th century a paper mill and a gypsum factory were built. The former continues to exist today as a factory for manufacturing insulation material for power plants with the name of Pucaro. Roigheim survived World War I relatively unharmed. World War II, however, brought the village closer to the front. In 1945 there were 356 refugees placed in Roigheim and about 50 foreign prisoners working in the gypsum factory. From Tuesday 3 April 1945 Roigheim was occupied by the Americans and the village became part of the American occupation zone. On 6 May 1946 there was the first election after the war but the people of Roigheim, still deeply rooted in traditional ideas, were not yet true democrats. The mayor, Christian Hübler, who was elected was only a pawn to be replaced by the former mayor, Eugen Reichert. Reichert had not been allowed to run for office in 1946 due to U.S. policy but after the three years had passed, in 1948, Hübler stepped down and was replaced by Reichert.

== Origin of the name ==
There are two versions for the origin of the name Roigheim. One story says that Roigheim comes from the Alemannic warrior Roho who is supposed to have settled what he then named Rohingen before 500. When the Franconians conquered the villages they renamed it Rohinkheim. The second story claims that the founder of Roigheim was called Rohink. As he was a Franconian, he named the village Rohinkheim, heim being the customary ending for Franconian villages.

== Facts and figures ==
Roigheim's area consists of 46% farm land, 32% wood, 4% waste land and water, 8% settled terrain, and 10% pastures (1980). In 1992 there were 72% Protestant-Lutheran, 18% Catholics, and 10% rest. This is a great contrast to 1907 when 98% were Protestant-Lutheran and 2% Catholic. The population has also experienced great change. In 1939 only 935 people were living in Roigheim. After that date the population increased rapidly to 1,620 in 1960 when it peaked. In 1992 the population had receded slightly to 1,498. In 1993, 6% of the population were citizens of other countries than Germany.

== Sources ==
Englert, Karlheinz. 1994. Roigheim: damals und heute. Heimatkundlicher Arbeitskreis Roigheim.

== Image gallery ==
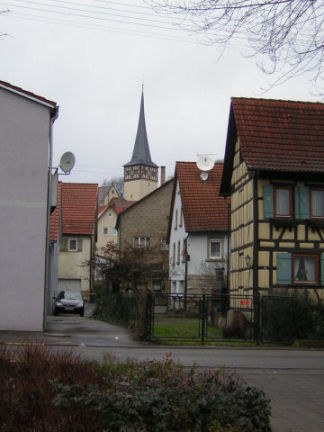
View of the church

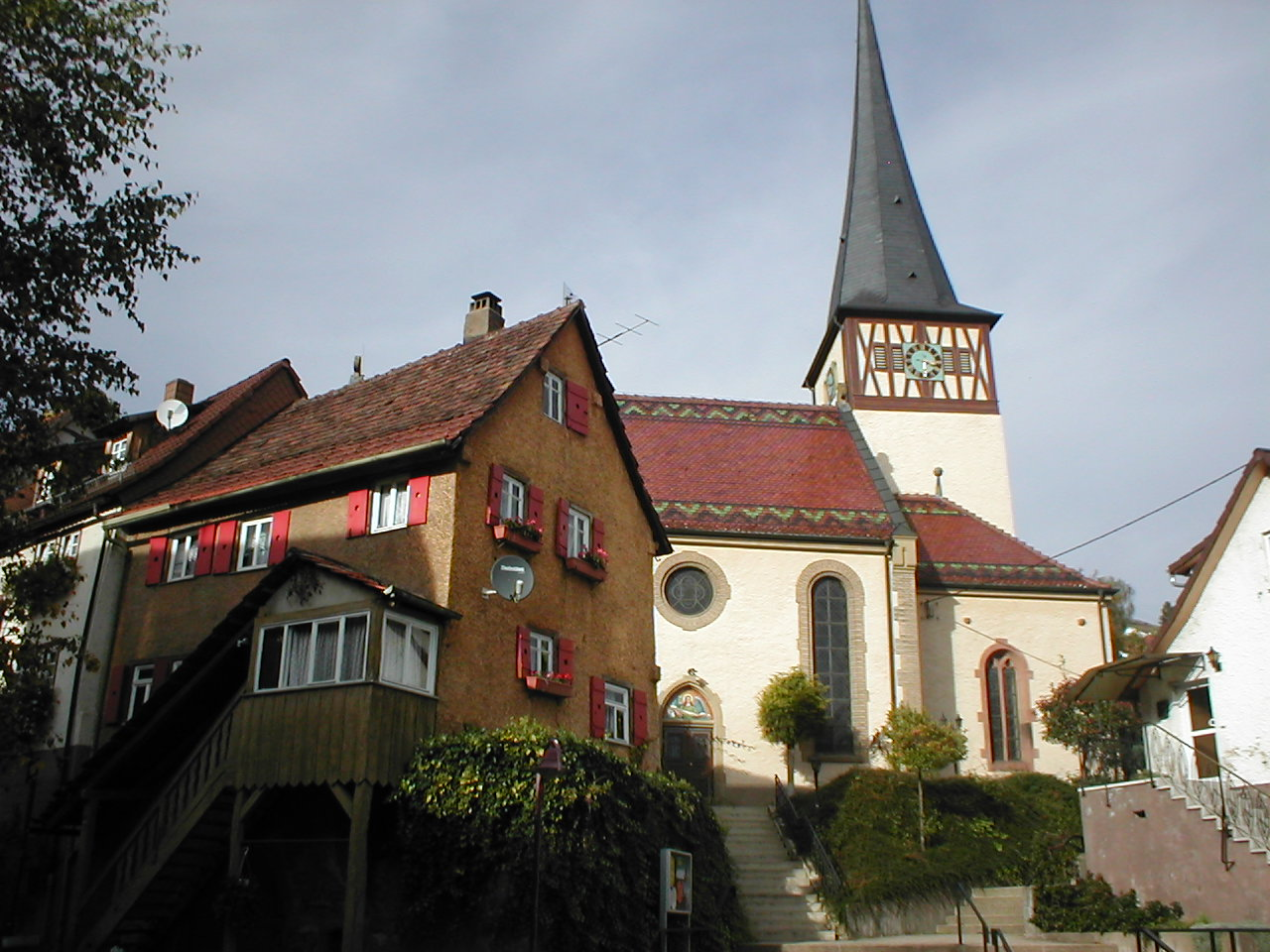
Protestant church, built 1902

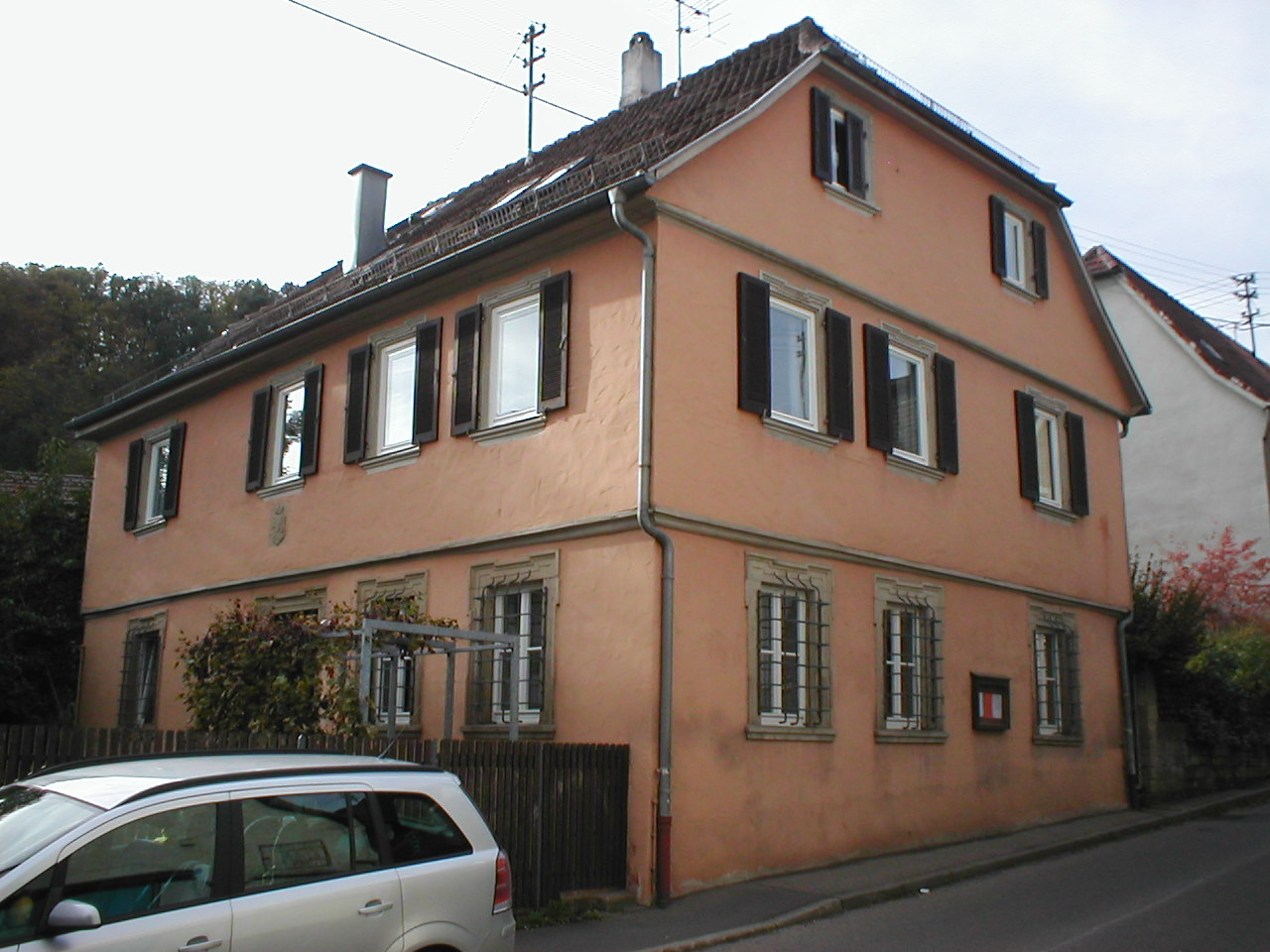
Parsonage, built 1722

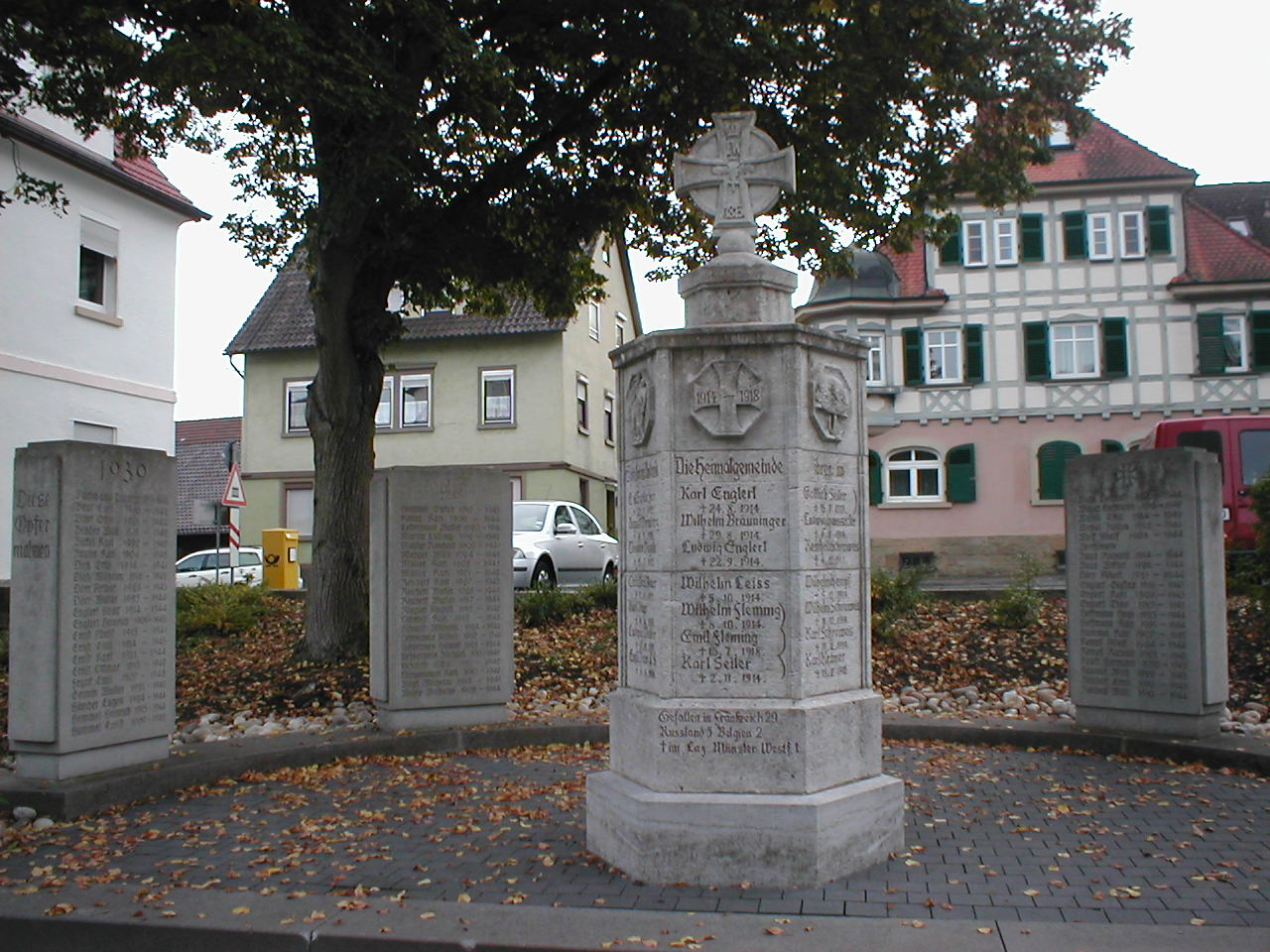
War memorial, near town hall

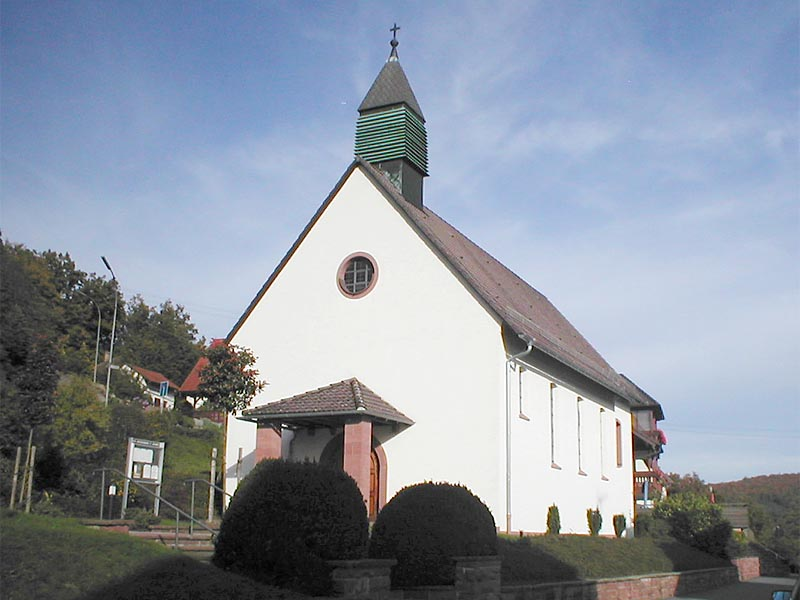
Catholic chapel St. Johannes
