= Josip Juratovic =

German politician

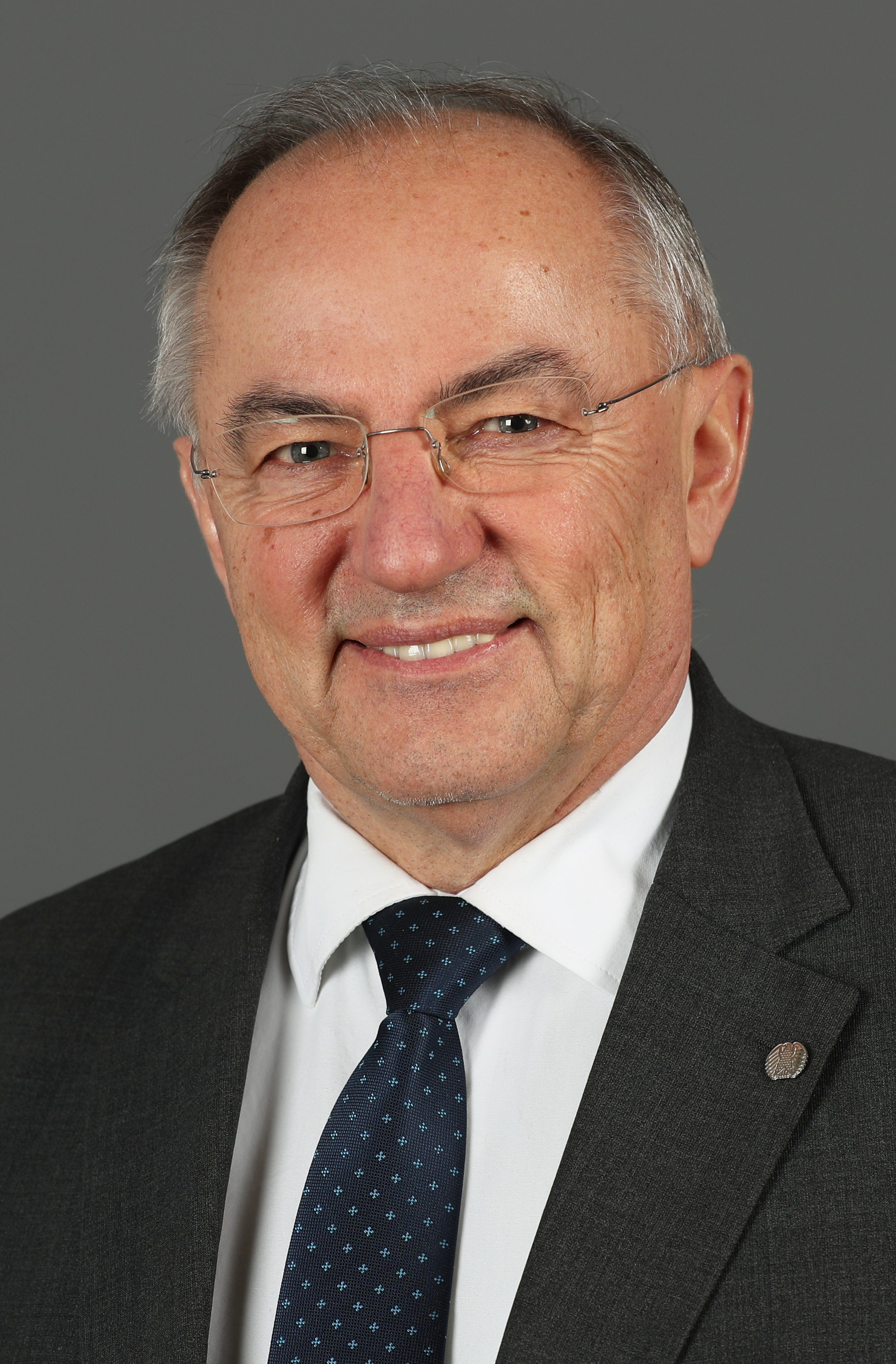
- Josip Juratovic in 2020

Member of the Bundestag
- Incumbent
- Assumed office 18 October 2005

Personal details
- Born: 15 January 1959 (age 67) Koprivnica, SFR Yugoslavia (present day Croatia)
- Party: SPD

Josip Juratovic (born 15 January 1959) is a German-Croatian auto mechanic, trade unionist and politician of the Social Democratic Party (SPD). He has served as a member of the Bundestag from the state of Baden-Württemberg from 2005 to 2025.

== Political career ==
Juratovic was first elected to the Bundestag in the 2005 German federal election, representing Heilbronn. From 2005 to 2013, he served on the Committee on Labour and Social Affairs. Since 2014, he has been a member of the Committee on Foreign Affairs. In this capacity, he serves as his parliamentary group’s rapporteur on relations with South-Eastern Europe.

In addition to his committee work, Juratovic chairs the German Parliamentary Friendship Group for Relations with the States of South-Eastern Europe and co-chairs the German Parliamentary Friendship Group for Relations with the Northern Adriatic States. He has been a substitute member of the German delegation to the Parliamentary Assembly of the Council of Europe (PACE) 2014-2025, where he has served on the Committee on Migration, Refugees and Displaced Persons (since 2014) and the Sub-Committee on Education, Youth and Sport (2015-2018).

In 2024 he announced that he would not seek re-election to the Bundestag.

== Other activities ==
- IG Metall, union member
