= Widdern =

- Town
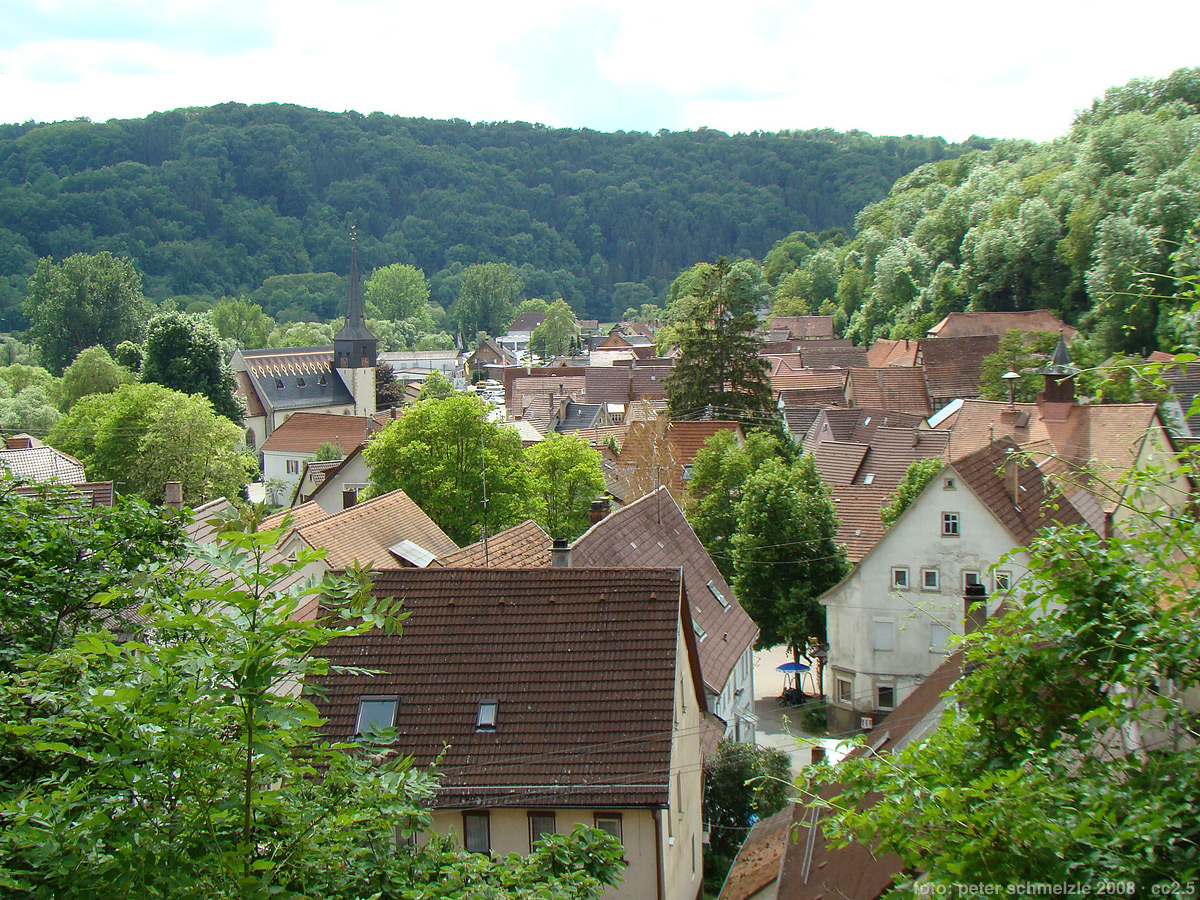

- Coat of arms

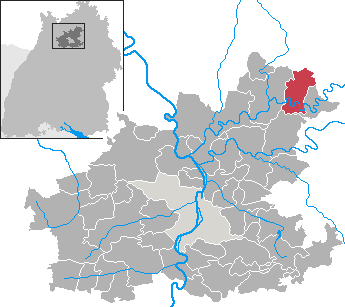
- Location of Widdern within Heilbronn district
- Interactive map of Widdern
- Location within Germany Location within Baden-Württemberg
- Coordinates: 49°19′N 9°25′E
- Country: Germany
- State: Baden-Württemberg
- Admin. region: Stuttgart
- District: Heilbronn
- Subdivisions: 2

Government
  - Mayor (2019–27): Kevin Kopf

Area
  - Total: 25.23 km^{2} (9.74 sq mi)
- Elevation: 185 m (607 ft)

Population (2025-12-31)
  - Total: 1,801
  - Density: 71.38/km^{2} (184.9/sq mi)
- Time zone: UTC+01:00 (CET)
  - Summer (DST): UTC+02:00 (CEST)
- Postal codes: 74259
- Dialling codes: 06298
- Vehicle registration: HN
- Website: www.widdern.de

Widdern (German: [ˈvɪdɐn]) is a town in the district of Heilbronn, Baden-Württemberg, Germany. It is situated on the river Jagst, 24 km northeast of Heilbronn.

== Mayors ==
- 1995–2011: Michael Reinert
- 2011–2019: Jürgen Olma
- since 2019: Kevin Kopf
