= Offenau =

Municipality in Baden-Württemberg

- Municipality
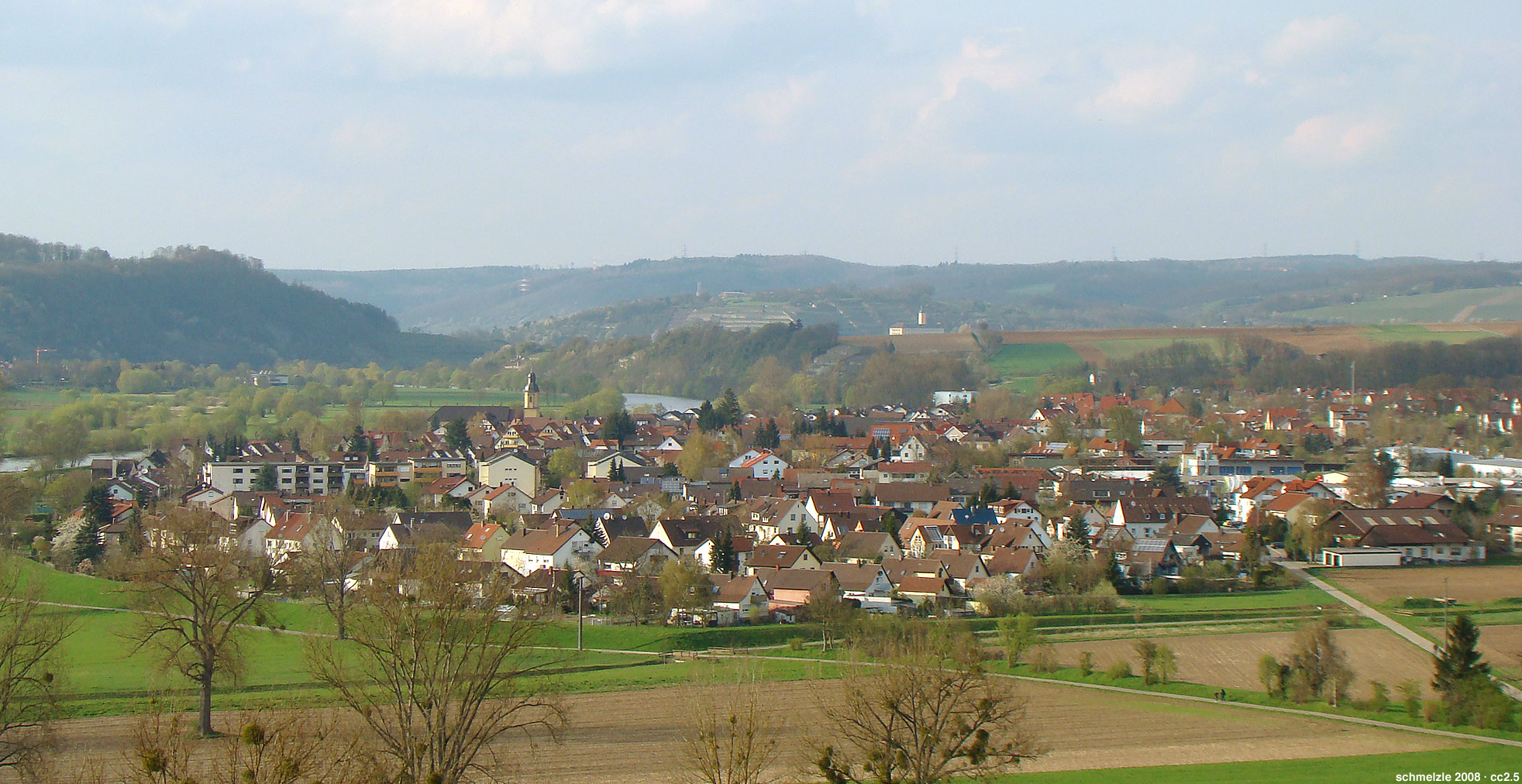
- Offenau from South-West

- Coat of arms

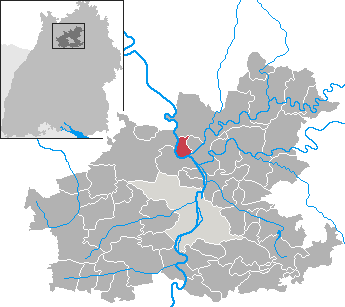
- Location of Offenau within Heilbronn district
- Interactive map of Offenau
- Location within Germany Location within Baden-Württemberg
- Coordinates: 49°15′N 9°10′E
- Country: Germany
- State: Baden-Württemberg
- Admin. region: Stuttgart
- District: Heilbronn

Government
  - Mayor (2019–27): Michael Folk (SPD)

Area
  - Total: 5.66 km^{2} (2.19 sq mi)
- Elevation: 148 m (486 ft)

Population (2025-12-31)
  - Total: 2,847
  - Density: 503/km^{2} (1,300/sq mi)
- Time zone: UTC+01:00 (CET)
  - Summer (DST): UTC+02:00 (CEST)
- Postal codes: 74254
- Dialling codes: 07136
- Vehicle registration: HN
- Website: www.offenau.de

Offenau (German: [ˈɔfənaʊ]) is a municipality in the district of Heilbronn in Baden-Württemberg in Germany.
