= Hardthausen am Kocher =

- Municipality
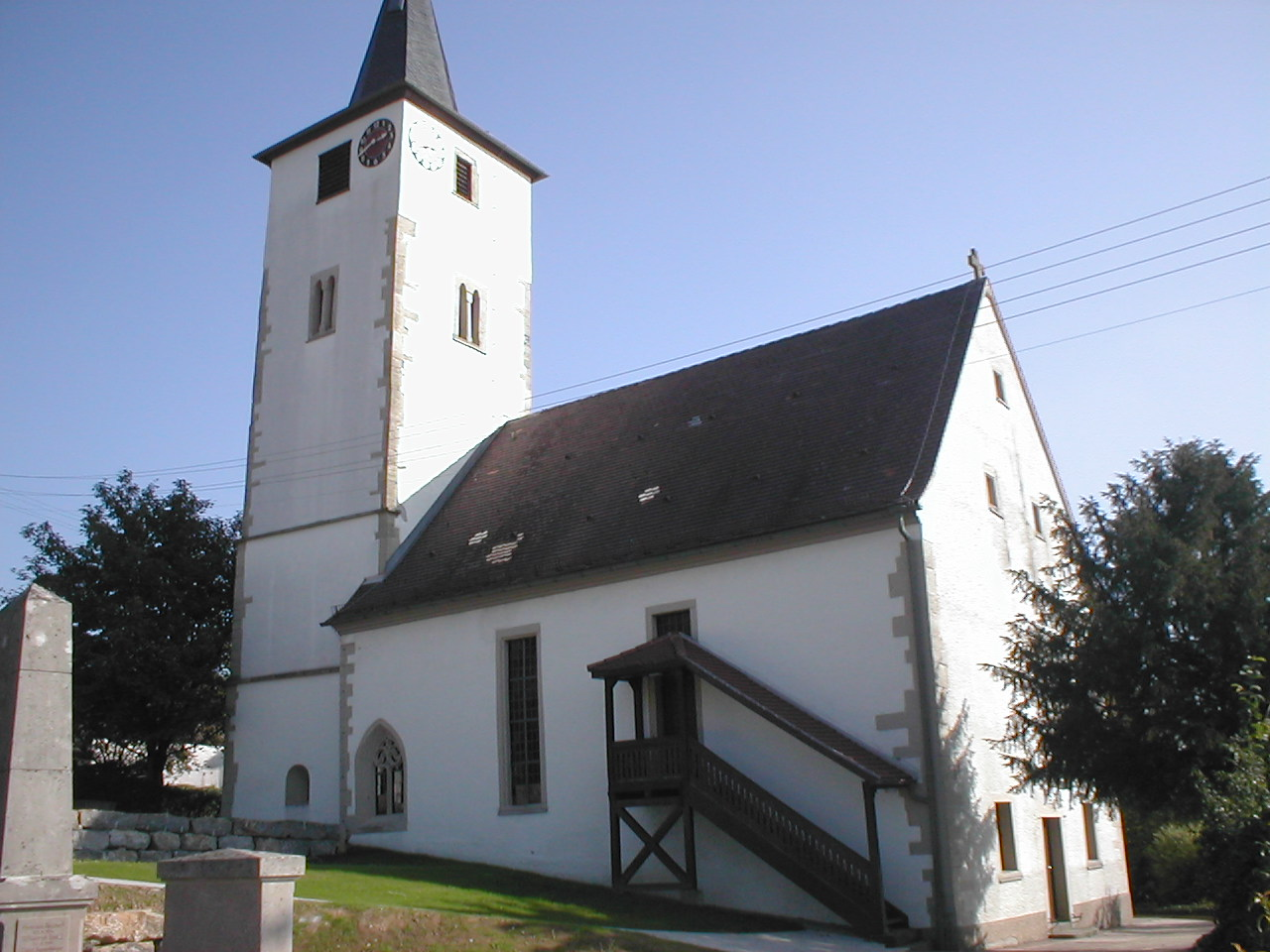
- Church in Lampoldshausen

- Coat of arms

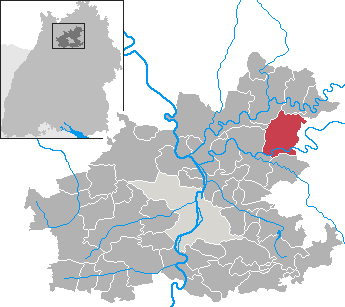
- Location of Hardthausen am Kocher within Heilbronn district
- Interactive map of Hardthausen am Kocher
- Location within Germany Location within Baden-Württemberg
- Coordinates: 49°14′N 9°24′E
- Country: Germany
- State: Baden-Württemberg
- Admin. region: Stuttgart
- District: Heilbronn
- Subdivisions: 3

Government
  - Mayor (2018–26): Thomas Einfalt

Area
  - Total: 35.55 km^{2} (13.73 sq mi)
- Elevation: 182 m (597 ft)

Population (2025-12-31)
  - Total: 4,499
  - Density: 126.6/km^{2} (327.8/sq mi)
- Time zone: UTC+01:00 (CET)
  - Summer (DST): UTC+02:00 (CEST)
- Postal codes: 74239
- Dialling codes: 07139
- Vehicle registration: HN
- Website: www.hardthausen.de

Hardthausen am Kocher (German pronunciation: [haʁtˈhaʊ̯zn̩ ʔam ˈkɔxɐ]) is a town in the district of Heilbronn in Baden-Württemberg in southern Germany.

== Geography ==
=== Location ===
Hardthausen lies in the east of the county of Heilbronn in the lower Kocher valley on the southern edge of the Harthausen Forest.
