= Gemmingen =

- Municipality
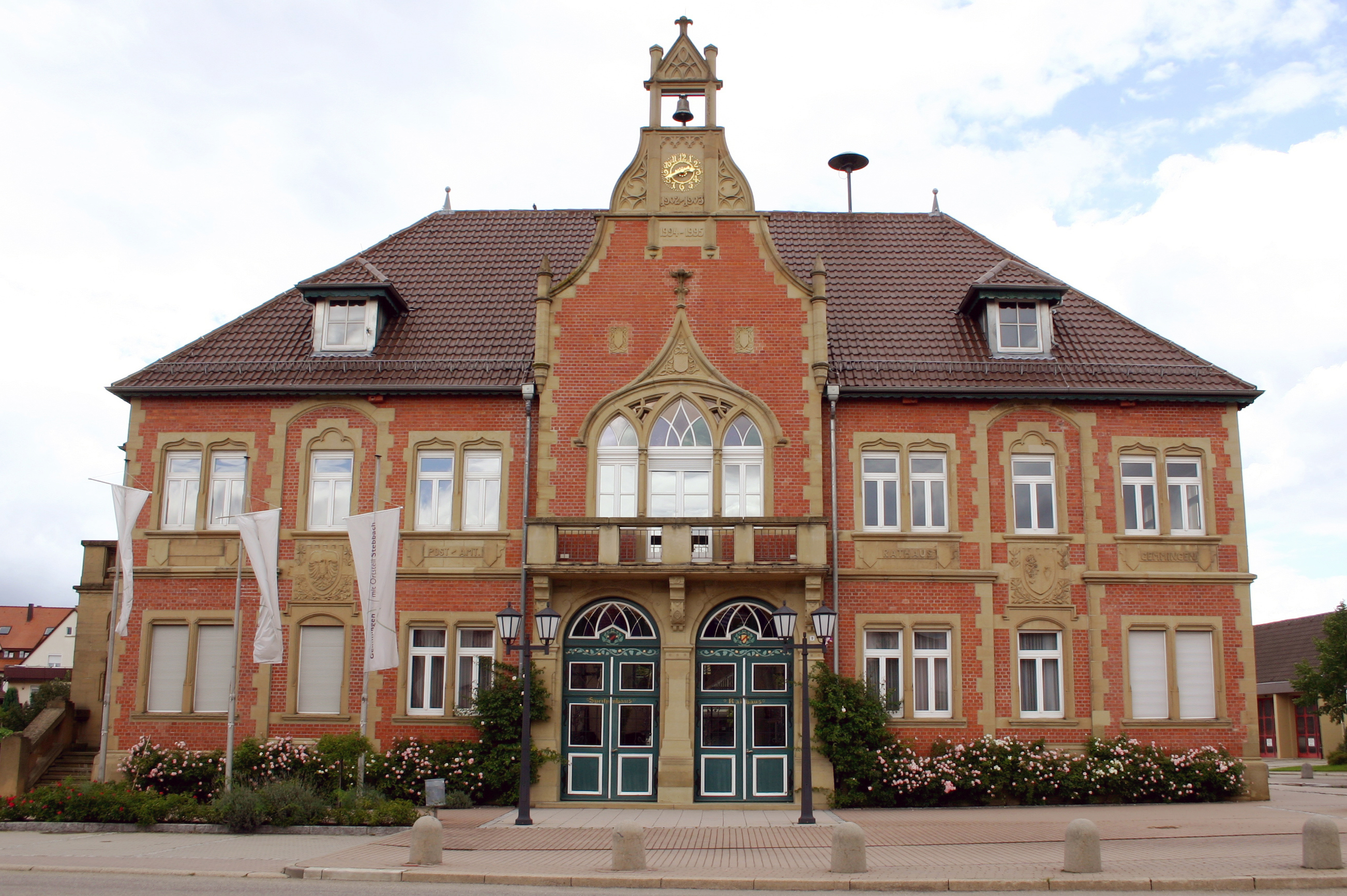
- Town hall

- Coat of arms

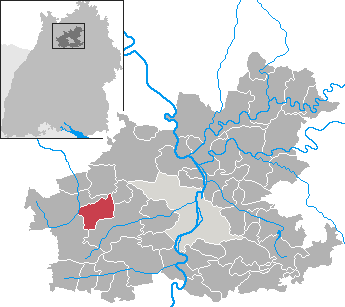
- Location of Gemmingen within Heilbronn district
- Interactive map of Gemmingen
- Location within Germany Location within Baden-Württemberg
- Coordinates: 49°9′N 8°59′E
- Country: Germany
- State: Baden-Württemberg
- Admin. region: Stuttgart
- District: Heilbronn
- Subdivisions: 2

Government
  - Mayor (2017–25): Timo Wolf

Area
  - Total: 19.08 km^{2} (7.37 sq mi)
- Elevation: 212 m (696 ft)

Population (2025-12-31)
  - Total: 5,582
  - Density: 292.6/km^{2} (757.7/sq mi)
- Time zone: UTC+01:00 (CET)
  - Summer (DST): UTC+02:00 (CEST)
- Postal codes: 75050
- Dialling codes: 07267
- Vehicle registration: HN
- Website: www.gemmingen4u.de

Gemmingen (German: [ˈɡɛmɪŋən]; South Franconian: Gemminge) is a town in the district of Heilbronn in Baden-Württemberg in southern Germany.
