= Eberstadt =

- Municipality
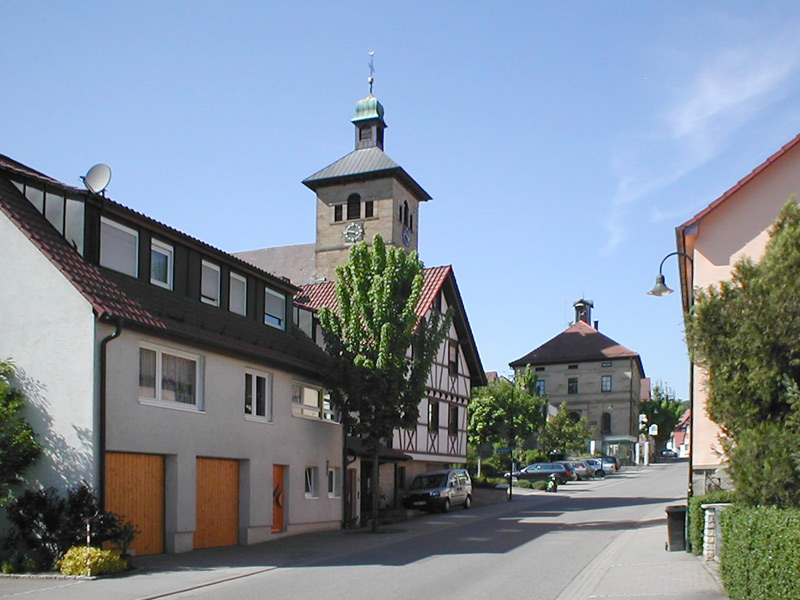
- Town centre

- Coat of arms

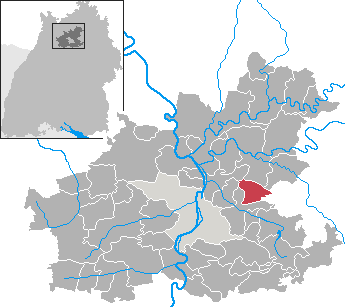
- Location of Eberstadt within Heilbronn district
- Interactive map of Eberstadt
- Location within Germany Location within Baden-Württemberg
- Coordinates: 49°11′N 9°19′E
- Country: Germany
- State: Baden-Württemberg
- Admin. region: Stuttgart
- District: Heilbronn
- Municipal assoc.: Raum Weinsberg
- Subdivisions: 5

Government
  - Mayor (2023–31): Patrick Dillig (CDU)

Area
  - Total: 12.5 km^{2} (4.8 sq mi)
- Elevation: 191 m (627 ft)

Population (2025-12-31)
  - Total: 3,212
  - Density: 257/km^{2} (666/sq mi)
- Time zone: UTC+01:00 (CET)
  - Summer (DST): UTC+02:00 (CEST)
- Postal codes: 74246
- Dialling codes: 07134
- Vehicle registration: HN
- Website: www.eberstadt.de

Eberstadt (German: [ˈeːbɐʃtat]) is a municipality in the district of Heilbronn, Baden-Württemberg, Germany. It is best known for its winegrowing and its yearly international high jump meeting (the Internationales Hochsprung-Meeting Eberstadt).
