= Heilbronn (district) =

Coordinates: 49.16°N 9.25°E

- District
- Flag Coat of arms
- Country: Germany
- State: Baden-Württemberg
- Adm. region: Stuttgart
- Capital: Heilbronn

Government
  - District admin.: Norbert Heuser

Area
  - Total: 1,099.59 km^{2} (424.55 sq mi)

Population (31 December 2025)
  - Total: 353,704
  - Density: 321.669/km^{2} (833.119/sq mi)
- Time zone: UTC+01:00 (CET)
  - Summer (DST): UTC+02:00 (CEST)
- Vehicle registration: HN
- Website: www.landkreis-heilbronn.de

Landkreis Heilbronn (German pronunciation: [haɪlˈbʁɔn]) is a Landkreis (district) in the north of Baden-Württemberg, Germany. Neighboring districts are (from north clockwise) Neckar-Odenwald, Hohenlohe, Schwäbisch Hall, Rems-Murr, Ludwigsburg, Enz, Karlsruhe and Rhein-Neckar. In the centre of it is the free-city of Heilbronn, which is its own separate administrative area.

== History ==
The predecessor to the district is the Oberamt Heilbronn, which was created in 1803 when the previously Free Imperial City of Heilbronn was incorporated into the Electorate of Württemberg. In 1926, about half of the Oberamt (old district) of Weinsberg was added. In 1938, it was recognized as a district, and in addition to the previous Oberamt, parts of the dissolved Oberämter Neckarsulm, Brackenheim, Marbach and Besigheim were added. The city of Heilbronn was not included in the district. In 1973, the Landkreise (districts) were reorganized, and part of the dissolved districts of Sinsheim, Mosbach, Buchen and Schwäbisch Hall were added. Within the following two years 5 municipalities were incorporated into the city and therefore left the district, which got its current borders in 1975.

== Geography ==
The main river in the district is the Neckar, which flows through the district from the south to the north. The western part of the district belongs to the landscape Kraichgau, the east to the Hohenloher Ebene, Kocher-Jagst-Ebene, and the Löwensteiner Berge.

== Coat of arms ==
The coat of arms shows a clawless eagle, the symbol of the Counts of Lauffen, who ruled the area of the district in the 13th century.

== Towns and municipalities ==
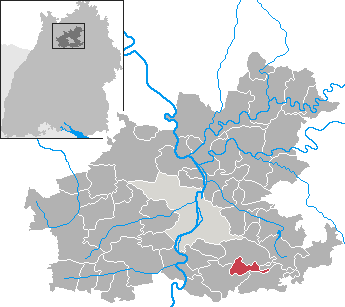
Clickable map of towns and municipalities in the district

Towns (Städte):

1. Bad Friedrichshall
2. Bad Rappenau
3. Bad Wimpfen
4. Brackenheim
5. Eppingen
6. Gundelsheim
7. Lauffen
8. Leingarten
9. Löwenstein
10. Möckmühl
11. Neckarsulm
12. Neudenau
13. Neuenstadt am Kocher
14. Schwaigern
15. Widdern

Municipalities (Gemeinden):

1. Cleebronn
2. Erlenbach (Württemberg)
3. Flein
4. Gemmingen
5. Hardthausen (Kocher)
6. Ittlingen
7. Jagsthausen
8. Kirchardt
9. Langenbrettach
10. Massenbachhausen
11. Neckarwestheim
12. Nordheim (Württemberg)
13. Obersulm
14. Oedheim
15. Offenau
16. Roigheim
17. Siegelsbach
18. Talheim
19. Untereisesheim
20. Wüstenrot

Gemeindeverwaltungsverbände
1. Oberes Zabergäu; 1. Güglingen^{1,2}; 2. Pfaffenhofen; 3. Zaberfeld	2. Raum Weinsberg; 1. Eberstadt; 2. Ellhofen; 3. Lehrensteinsfeld; 4. Weinsberg^{1,2}	3. Schozach-Bottwartal; 1. Abstatt; 2. Beilstein^{2}; 3. Ilsfeld^{1}; 4. Untergruppenbach
^{1}seat of the Gemeindeverwaltungsverband; ^{2}town
