= Langenbrettach =

- Municipality
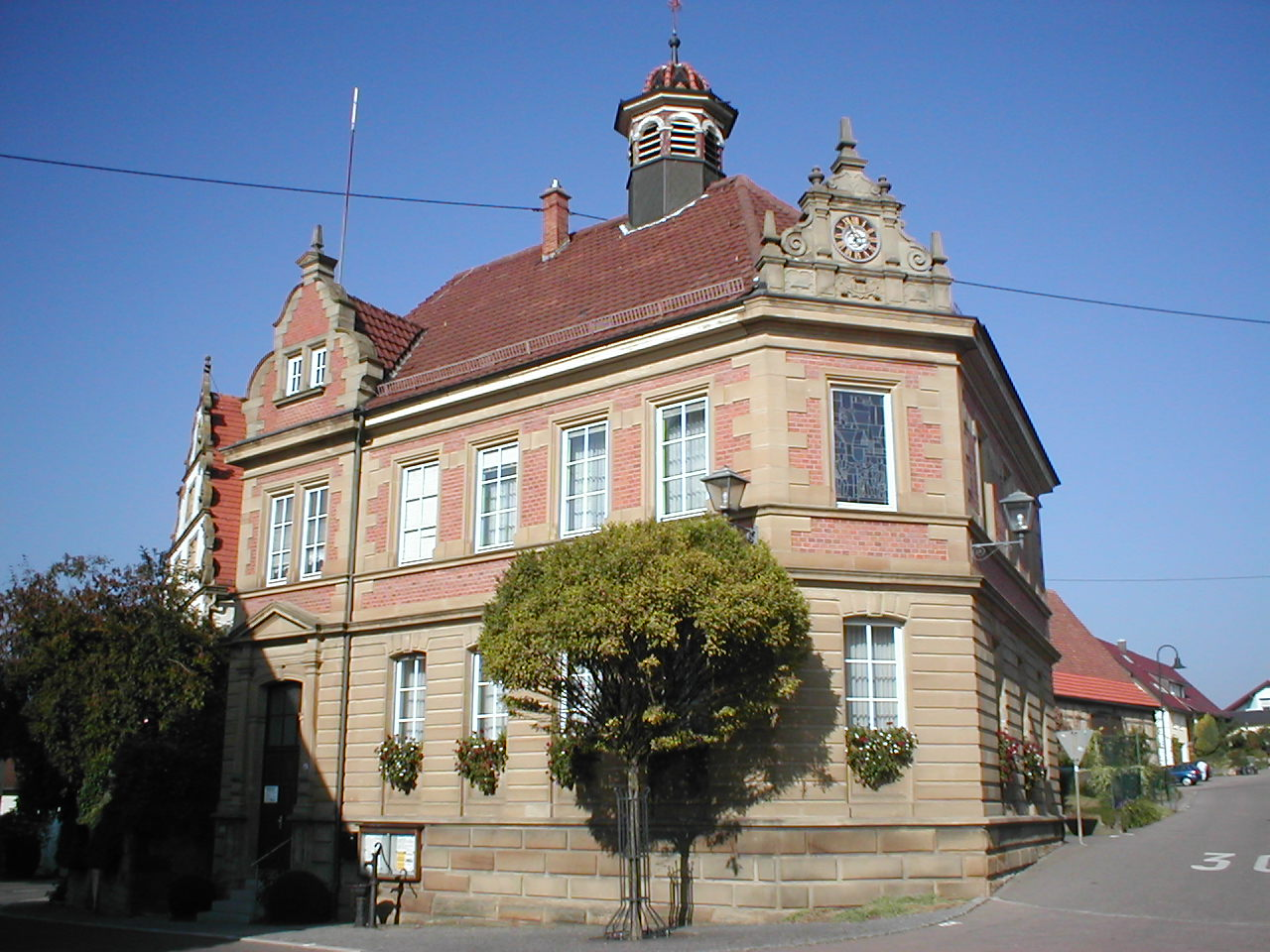
- Town hall

- Coat of arms

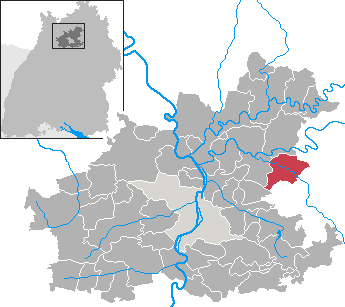
- Location of Langenbrettach within Heilbronn district
- Interactive map of Langenbrettach
- Location within Germany Location within Baden-Württemberg
- Coordinates: 49°14′N 9°23′E
- Country: Germany
- State: Baden-Württemberg
- Admin. region: Stuttgart
- District: Heilbronn
- Subdivisions: 3

Government
  - Mayor (2019–27): Timo Natter

Area
  - Total: 23.97 km^{2} (9.25 sq mi)
- Elevation: 194 m (636 ft)

Population (2025-12-31)
  - Total: 3,889
  - Density: 162.2/km^{2} (420.2/sq mi)
- Time zone: UTC+01:00 (CET)
  - Summer (DST): UTC+02:00 (CEST)
- Postal codes: 74243
- Dialling codes: 07139 and 07946
- Vehicle registration: HN
- Website: www.langenbrettach.de

Langenbrettach (German: [laŋənˈbʁɛtax]) is a town in the district of Heilbronn in Baden-Württemberg in Germany.

The two towns Brettach and Langenbeutingen were combined in 1975.

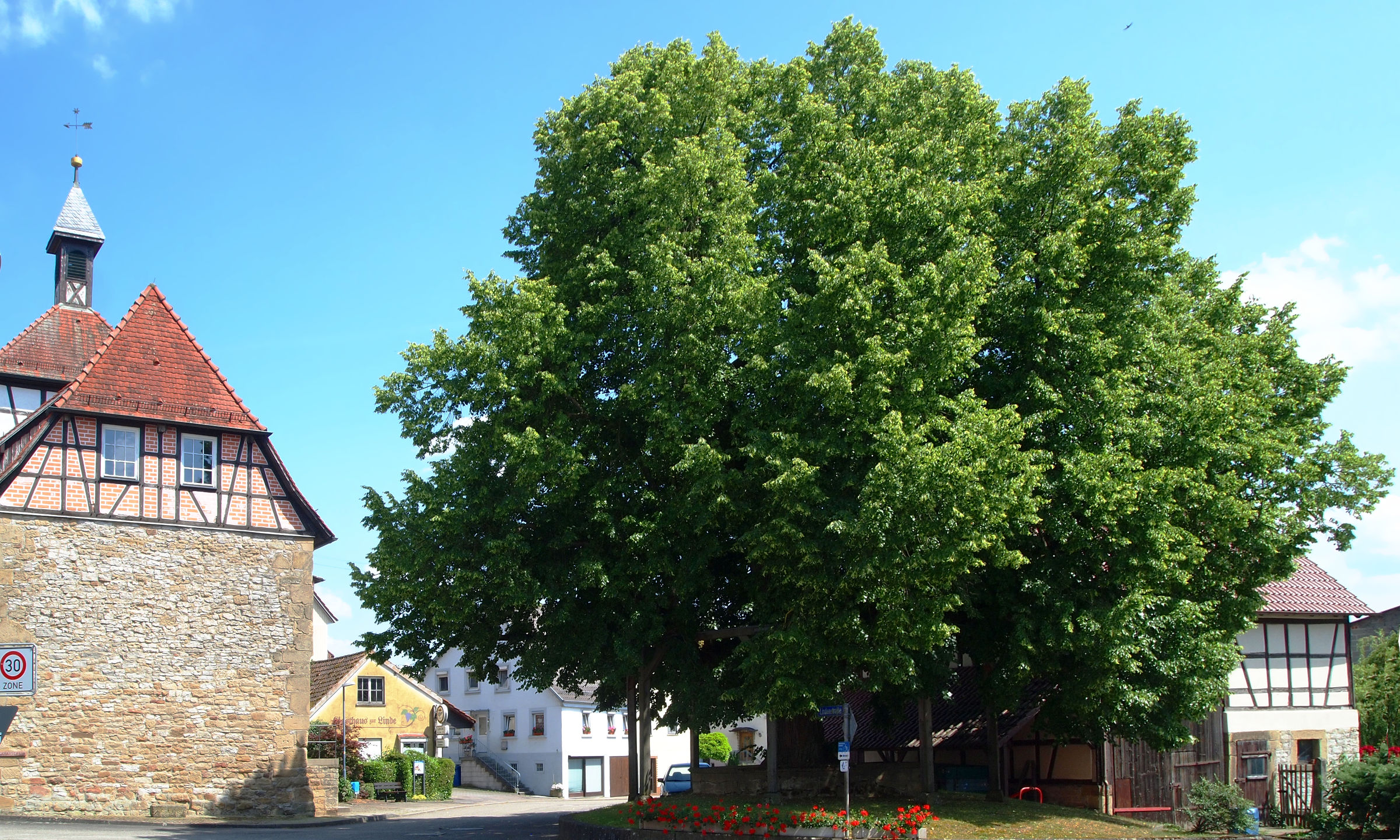
half-timber church and hunger lime tree in Langenbeutingen

== Demographics ==
Population development:

Year	Inhabitants
1990	2,813
2001	3,392
2011	3,657
2021	3,913
