= Oedheim =

- Municipality
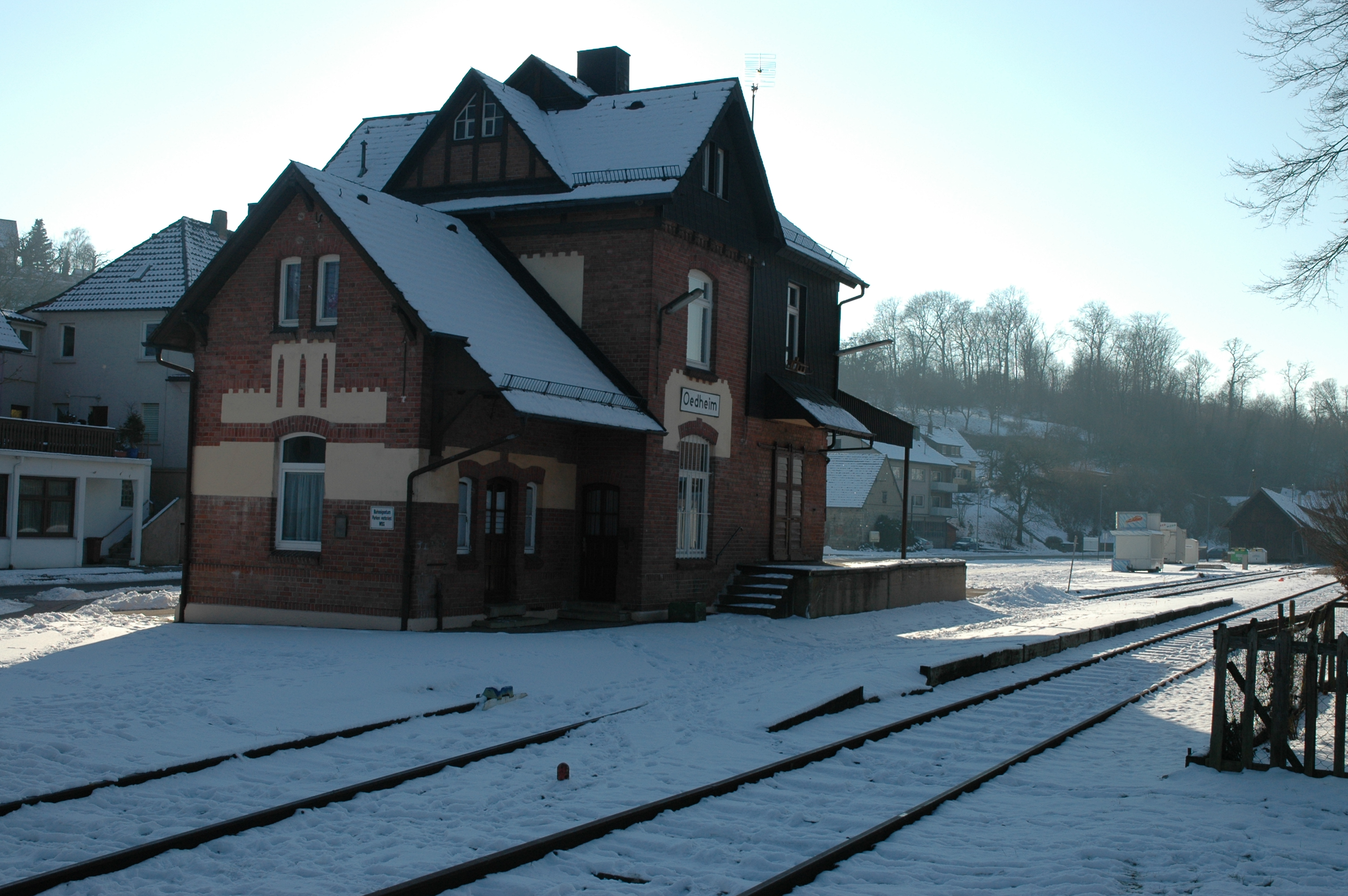
- Abandoned train station

- Coat of arms

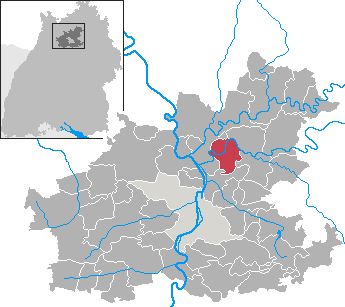
- Location of Oedheim within Heilbronn district
- Interactive map of Oedheim
- Location within Germany Location within Baden-Württemberg
- Coordinates: 49°14′N 9°15′E
- Country: Germany
- State: Baden-Württemberg
- Admin. region: Stuttgart
- District: Heilbronn
- Subdivisions: 2

Government
  - Mayor (2023–31): Matthias Schmitt

Area
  - Total: 21.26 km^{2} (8.21 sq mi)
- Elevation: 166 m (545 ft)

Population (2025-12-31)
  - Total: 6,692
  - Density: 314.8/km^{2} (815.2/sq mi)
- Time zone: UTC+01:00 (CET)
  - Summer (DST): UTC+02:00 (CEST)
- Postal codes: 74229
- Dialling codes: 07136, 07139
- Vehicle registration: HN
- Website: www.oedheim.de

Oedheim (German: [ˈøːthaɪm]) is a town in the north west of Baden-Württemberg, Germany. It is a small town with about 7,000 inhabitants. It belongs to the district Heilbronn.

== Demographics ==
Population development:

Year	Inhabitants
1990	4,895
2001	5,813
2011	5,868
2021	6,544
