= Ittlingen =

German municipality

- Municipality
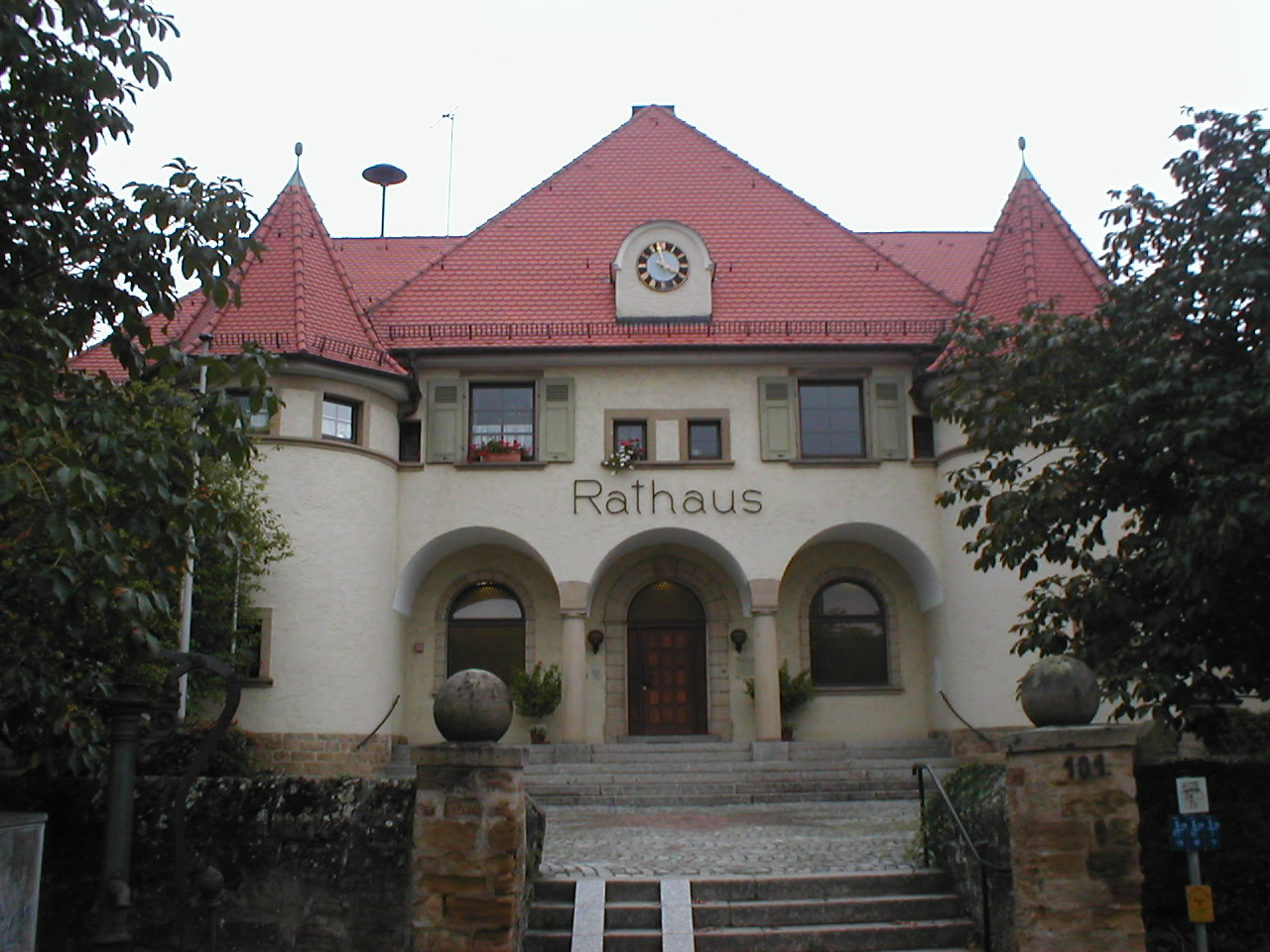
- Ittlingen town hall

- Coat of arms

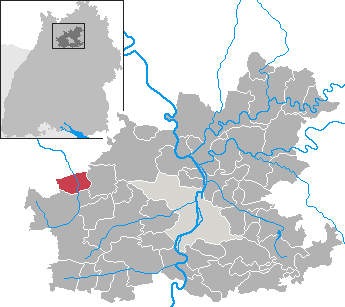
- Location of Ittlingen within Heilbronn district
- Interactive map of Ittlingen
- Location within Germany Location within Baden-Württemberg
- Coordinates: 49°11′N 8°56′E
- Country: Germany
- State: Baden-Württemberg
- Admin. region: Stuttgart
- District: Heilbronn

Area
  - Total: 14.11 km^{2} (5.45 sq mi)
- Elevation: 181 m (594 ft)

Population (2025-12-31)
  - Total: 2,613
  - Density: 185.2/km^{2} (479.6/sq mi)
- Time zone: UTC+01:00 (CET)
  - Summer (DST): UTC+02:00 (CEST)
- Postal codes: 74930
- Dialling codes: 07266
- Vehicle registration: HN
- Website: www.ittlingen.de

Ittlingen (German: [ˈɪtlɪŋən]) is a town in the district of Heilbronn in Baden-Württemberg, Germany.

== History ==
From 1355, Ittlingen was a possession of the Lordship of Gemmingen. Their rule ended in 1806, when the Gemmingens' properties were mediatized to the Grand Duchy of Baden. Ittlingen was assigned on 22 June 1807 to Oberamt Gochsheim, the only such district in Baden. On 24 July 1813, Ittlingen was assigned to the district of Eppingen. Following the abolition of that district on 1 April 1924, the town was assigned to the district of Sinsheim, which was reorganized on 25 June 1939 as Landkreis Sinsheim. Ittlingen expanded after World War II to its west. On 31 December 1972, Sinsheim's district was dissolved and Ittlingen was placed under the jurisdiction of Heilbronn.

== Geography ==
The municipality (Gemeinde) of Ittlingen covers 14.11 square kilometers (5.45 sq mi) of the district of Heilbronn, in German state of Baden-Württemberg. Ittlingen lies along the northwest edge of Heilbronn's district, on its border with the Rhine-Neckar district to the north. The municipal area is physically located in the Kraichgau, specifically in the valley of the river Elsenz, which flows through the municipality from south to north. Elevation above sea level in the municipal area ranges from a high of 257 meters (843 ft) Normalnull (NN) on the Lochberg, to the west, to a low of 170 meters (560 ft) NN at the municipal border with Sinsheim.

== Coat of arms ==
Ittlingen's municipal coat of arms displays a field of blue crossed by two yellow bars. At the center of the blazon is another, with a yellow plowshare upon a field of red. This pattern was created by the Karlsruhe General State Archives in 1910 by taking the arms of the House of Gemmingen and placing the plowshare blazon at its center to distinguish it. This pattern was accepted and a municipal flag issued by the Heilbronn district office on 1 October 1980.
