= Massenbachhausen =

- Municipality
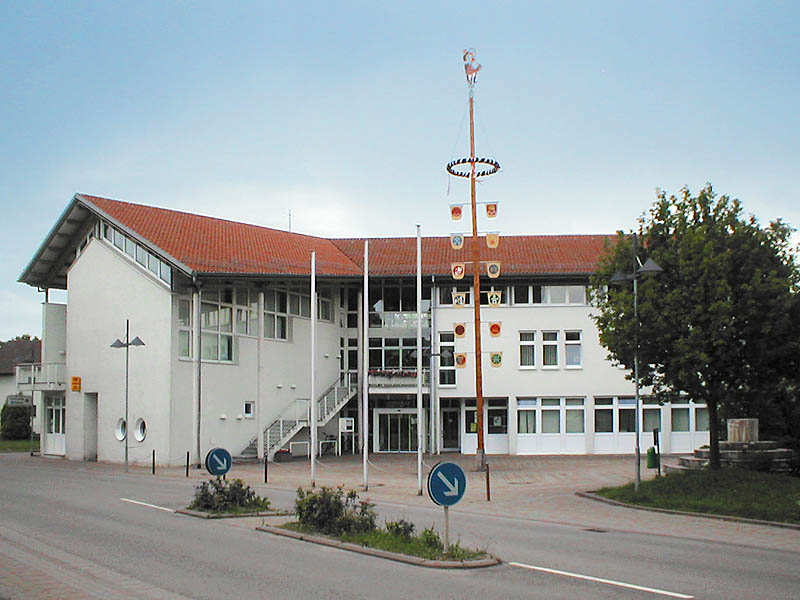
- Town hall

- Coat of arms

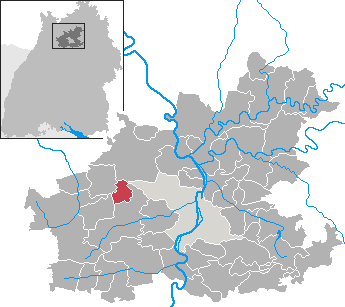
- Location of Massenbachhausen within Heilbronn district
- Interactive map of Massenbachhausen
- Location within Germany Location within Baden-Württemberg
- Coordinates: 49°11′N 9°3′E
- Country: Germany
- State: Baden-Württemberg
- Admin. region: Stuttgart
- District: Heilbronn

Government
  - Mayor (2018–26): Nico Morast

Area
  - Total: 8.76 km^{2} (3.38 sq mi)
- Elevation: 209 m (686 ft)

Population (2025-12-31)
  - Total: 3,725
  - Density: 425/km^{2} (1,100/sq mi)
- Time zone: UTC+01:00 (CET)
  - Summer (DST): UTC+02:00 (CEST)
- Postal codes: 74252
- Dialling codes: 07138
- Vehicle registration: HN
- Website: www.massenbachhausen.de

Massenbachhausen (German pronunciation: [masn̩baxˈhaʊ̯zn̩]) is a municipality in the district of Heilbronn in Baden-Württemberg in Germany.

== Geographical Location ==
Massenbachhausen lies in the west of the district of Heilbronn on the mass stream, a tributary of the flax flows, in turn, into the Neckar. It belongs to the fringe of the metropolitan region of Stuttgart.

== Neighboring Communities ==
Neighbor cities and communities are (clockwise from east): Schwaigern (district Massenbach), Gemmingen, Kirchardt, Bad Rappenau (all cities are district of Heilbronn) and Heilbronn (district city). With Schwaigern Massenbachhausen has entered into an Agreed administrative community.

== Demographics ==
Population development:

Year	Inhabitants
1990	3,070
2001	3,709
2011	3,389
2021	3,583

== Education ==
The local primary school is called Lindenhofschule. In Massenbachhausen there are also two kindergartens, a catholic one (Katholischer Kindergarten) and a public one (Kindergarten Schmähling).
