= Siegelsbach =

- Municipality
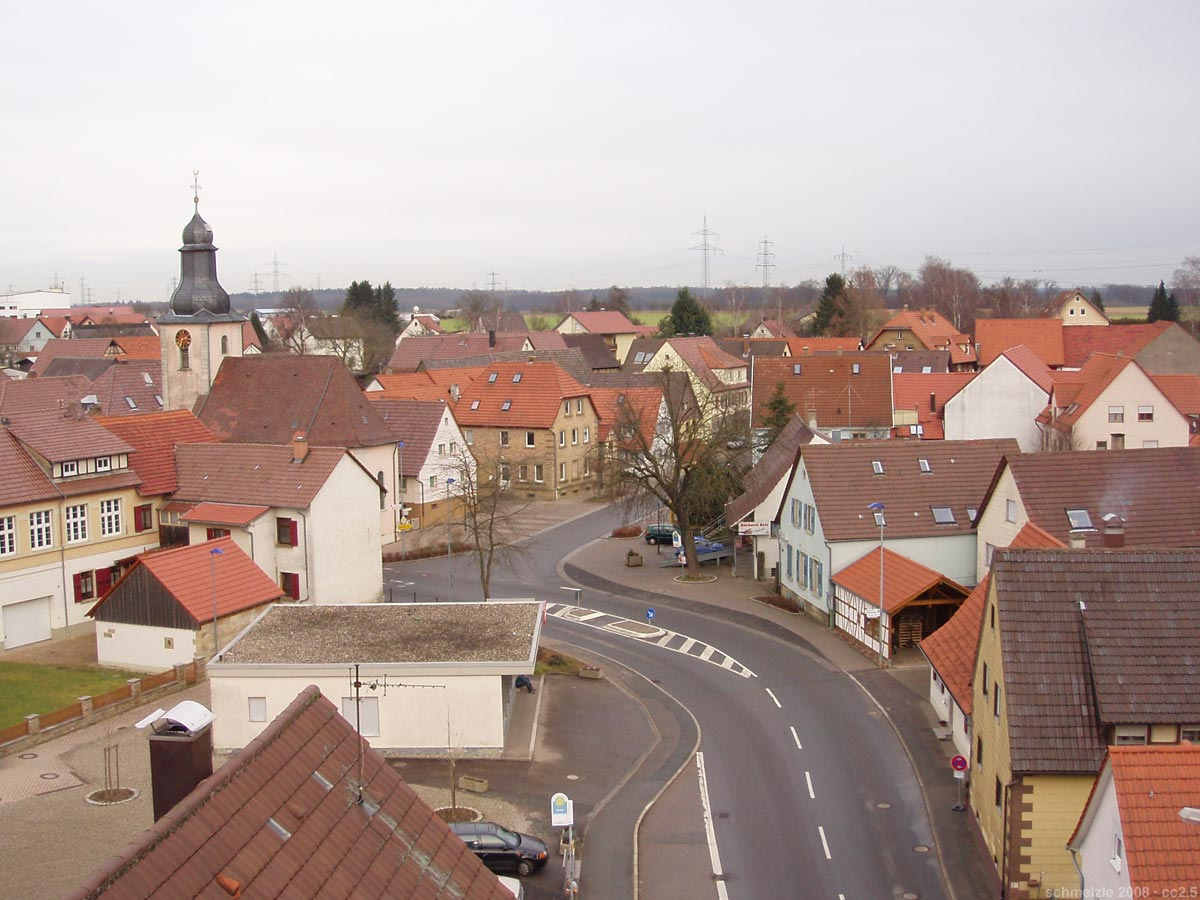
- Main street

- Coat of arms

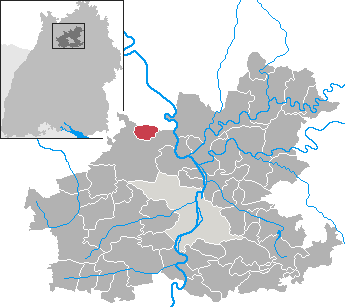
- Location of Siegelsbach within Heilbronn district
- Interactive map of Siegelsbach
- Location within Germany Location within Baden-Württemberg
- Coordinates: 49°16′N 9°5′E
- Country: Germany
- State: Baden-Württemberg
- Admin. region: Stuttgart
- District: Heilbronn

Government
  - Mayor (2017–25): Tobias Haucap

Area
  - Total: 7.68 km^{2} (2.97 sq mi)
- Elevation: 270 m (890 ft)

Population (2025-12-31)
  - Total: 1,663
  - Density: 217/km^{2} (561/sq mi)
- Time zone: UTC+01:00 (CET)
  - Summer (DST): UTC+02:00 (CEST)
- Postal codes: 74936
- Dialling codes: 07264
- Vehicle registration: HN
- Website: www.siegelsbach.de

Siegelsbach (German pronunciation: [ˈziːɡl̩sˌbax]) is a town in the district of Heilbronn in Baden-Württemberg in Germany.
