= Untereisesheim =

- Municipality
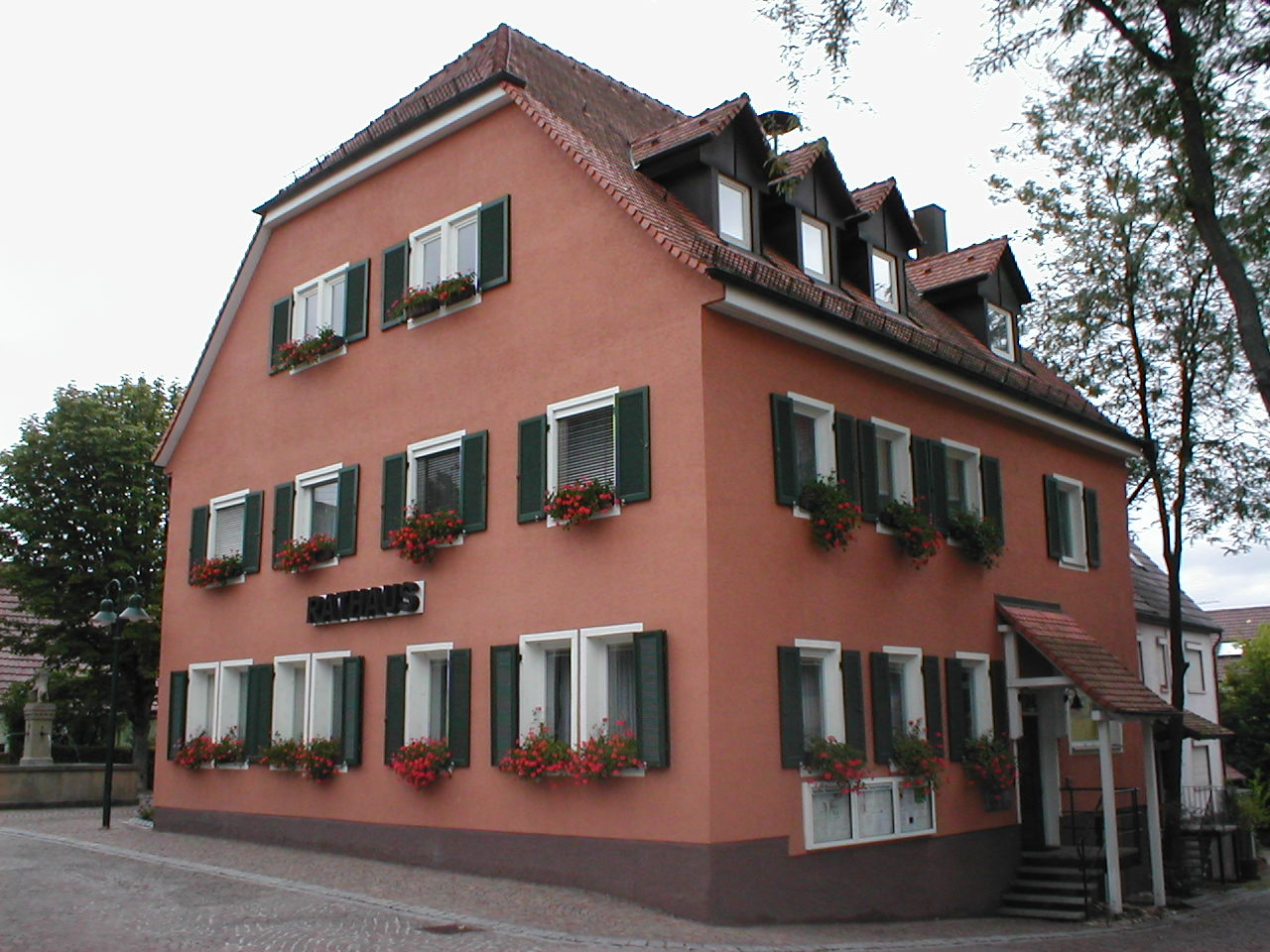
- Town hall

- Coat of arms

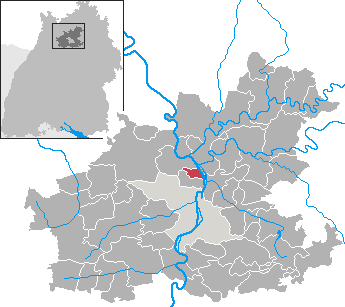
- Location of Untereisesheim within Heilbronn district
- Interactive map of Untereisesheim
- Location within Germany Location within Baden-Württemberg
- Coordinates: 49°13′N 9°12′E
- Country: Germany
- State: Baden-Württemberg
- Admin. region: Stuttgart
- District: Heilbronn

Government
  - Mayor (2022–30): Christian Tretow (SPD)

Area
  - Total: 3.67 km^{2} (1.42 sq mi)
- Elevation: 161 m (528 ft)

Population (2025-12-31)
  - Total: 4,330
  - Density: 1,180/km^{2} (3,060/sq mi)
- Time zone: UTC+01:00 (CET)
  - Summer (DST): UTC+02:00 (CEST)
- Postal codes: 74257
- Dialling codes: 07132
- Vehicle registration: HN
- Website: www.untereisesheim.de

Untereisesheim (German pronunciation: [ʊntɐˈʔaɪ̯zəshaɪ̯m], lit. 'Lower Eisesheim', in contrast to "Upper Eisesheim") is a municipality in the district of Heilbronn in Baden-Württemberg in Germany.
