= Lehrensteinsfeld =

- Municipality
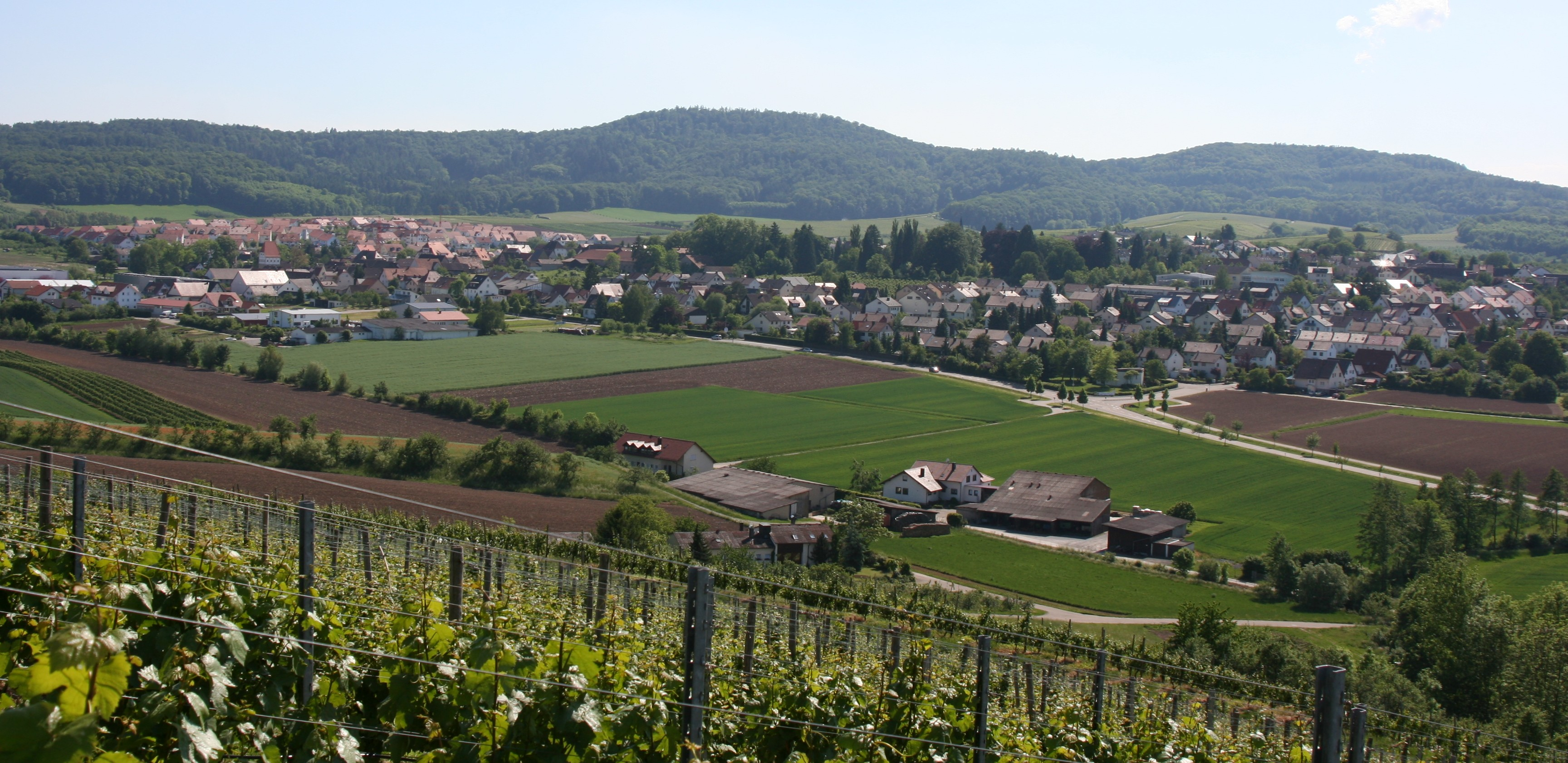
- View from North-East

- Coat of arms

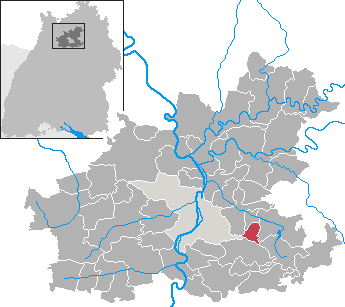
- Location of Lehrensteinsfeld within Heilbronn district
- Interactive map of Lehrensteinsfeld
- Location within Germany Location within Baden-Württemberg
- Coordinates: 49°8′N 9°19′E
- Country: Germany
- State: Baden-Württemberg
- Admin. region: Stuttgart
- District: Heilbronn
- Municipal assoc.: Raum Weinsberg

Government
  - Mayor (2021–29): Benjamin Krummhauer

Area
  - Total: 6.22 km^{2} (2.40 sq mi)
- Elevation: 220 m (720 ft)

Population (2025-12-31)
  - Total: 2,691
  - Density: 433/km^{2} (1,120/sq mi)
- Time zone: UTC+01:00 (CET)
  - Summer (DST): UTC+02:00 (CEST)
- Postal codes: 74251
- Dialling codes: 07134
- Vehicle registration: HN
- Website: www.lehrensteinsfeld.de

Lehrensteinsfeld (German pronunciation: [leːʁənˈʃtaɪ̯nsˌfɛlt]) is a municipality in the district of Heilbronn in Baden-Württemberg in Germany, with a population of 2,590 (as of 2019).

== Demographics ==
Population development:

Year	Inhabitants
1990	1,693
2001	1,909
2011	2,211
2021	2,637
