= Ellhofen =

- Municipality
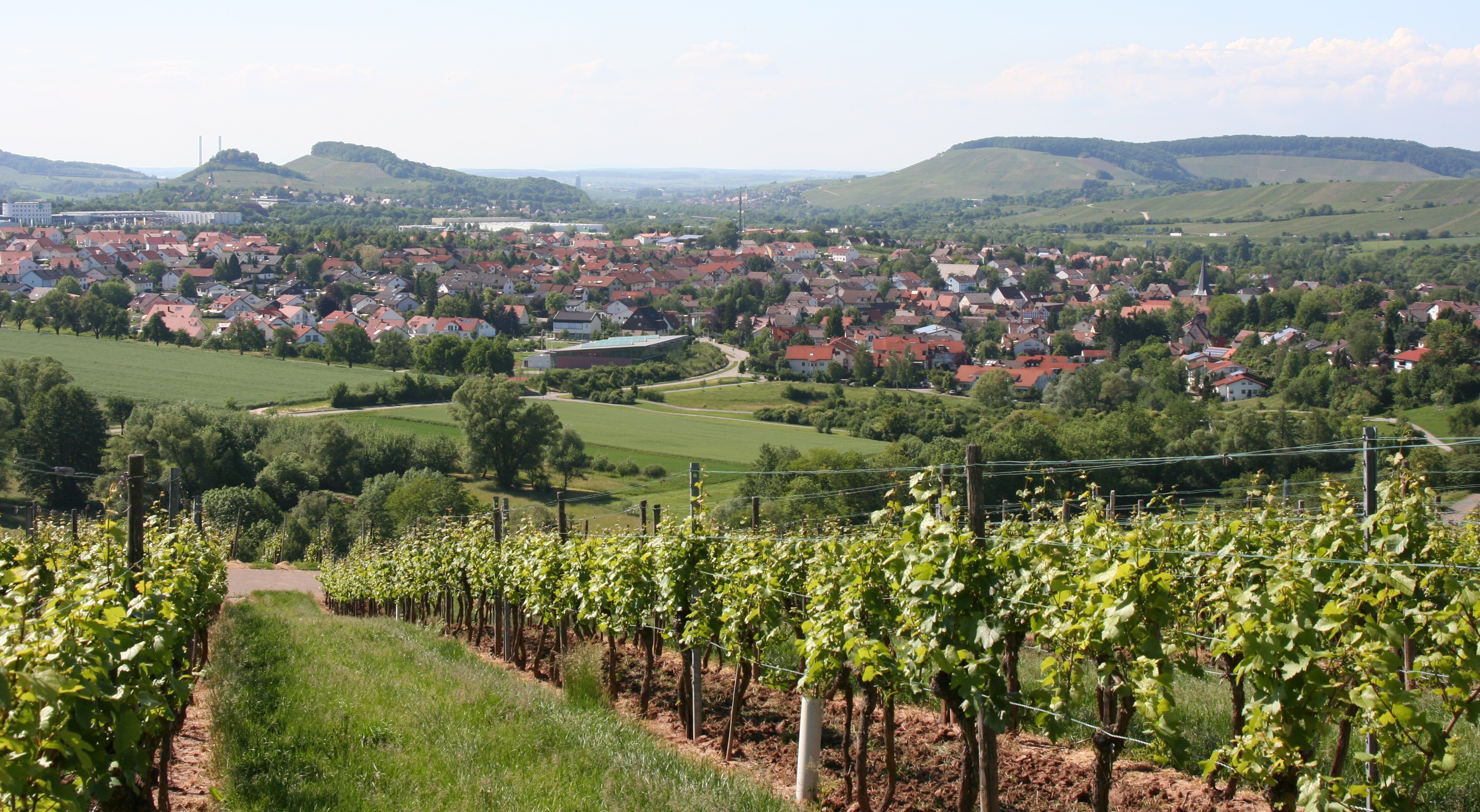
- View from South-East

- Coat of arms

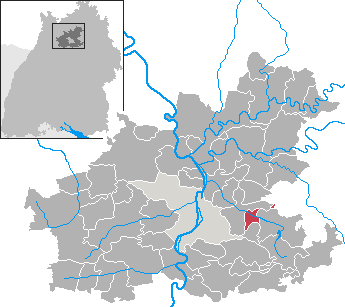
- Location of Ellhofen within Heilbronn district
- Interactive map of Ellhofen
- Location within Germany Location within Baden-Württemberg
- Coordinates: 49°9′N 9°19′E
- Country: Germany
- State: Baden-Württemberg
- Admin. region: Stuttgart
- District: Heilbronn
- Municipal assoc.: Raum Weinsberg

Government
  - Mayor (2023–31): Felix Pontow

Area
  - Total: 5.86 km^{2} (2.26 sq mi)
- Elevation: 189 m (620 ft)

Population (2025-12-31)
  - Total: 3,962
  - Density: 676/km^{2} (1,750/sq mi)
- Time zone: UTC+01:00 (CET)
  - Summer (DST): UTC+02:00 (CEST)
- Postal codes: 74248
- Dialling codes: 07134
- Vehicle registration: HN
- Website: www.ellhofen.de

Ellhofen (German: [ɛlˈhoːfn̩]) is a municipality in the district of Heilbronn in Baden-Württemberg in southern Germany.
