= Martin Hautzinger =

German psychologist and professor (born 1950)

Martin Hautzinger (born 1950) is a German psychologist and professor.

== Early life ==
Hautzinger was born in Frankenbach, Heilbronn in 1950.

== Career ==
Martin Hautzinger studied psychology from 1971 to 1976 in Bochum and at the Free University of Berlin. In 1980 he was awarded his doctorate from Technische Universität Berlin.

In 1981, he was appointed a professor of clinical psychology and psychodiagnostics at the University of Freiburg. From 1981 to 1983 he held the position of assistant professor at the University of Oregon in Eugene (United States), where he worked with Peter M. Lewinsohn. From 1984 to 1989 he was assistant professor of clinical and differential psychology at the University of Konstanz.

In 1990, he was appointed professor and head of the department of clinical psychology at the psychological institute of the University of Mainz. Since 1996 he has been professor of clinical psychology at the University of Tübingen, succeeding Niels Birbaumer.

His research focuses on cognitive behavioural therapy in mood affective disorders. He is the author and editor of several German textbooks and self-help guides in the fields of clinical psychology and behavioural therapy, and co-author of the German version of the Beck Depression Inventory.

Dr. Martin Hautzinger and Dr. Jan Ilhan Kizilhan founded the Institute of Psychotherapy and Psychotraumatology (IPP) in the University of Duhok (UoD) in the Kurdistan region of Iraq. The IPP has a long-term goal to enhance the mental health capacity within Kurdistan; to achieve this, the university's master's program was developed on a German Model.

== Notable works ==
- Martin Hautzinger: Depression im Alter. 1. Aufl. 2000, BeltzPVU, Weinheim, ISBN 978-3621274685.
- Aaron T. Beck, A. John Rush, Brian F. Shaw: Kognitive Therapie der Depression. Herausgegeben von Martin Hautzinger. 5. Aufl. 2001, BeltzPVU, Weinheim. ISBN 978-3621270151.
- Martin Hautzinger: Kognitive Verhaltenstherapie bei Depressionen. 6. Aufl. 2003, BeltzPVU, Weinheim, ISBN 978-3621275125.
- Michael Linden, Martin Hautzinger: Verhaltenstherapiemanual. 7. Aufl. 2011, Springer, ISBN 978-3642161964.
