= Heilbronn Power Station =

Coal-fired power Station in Hellbronn, Germany

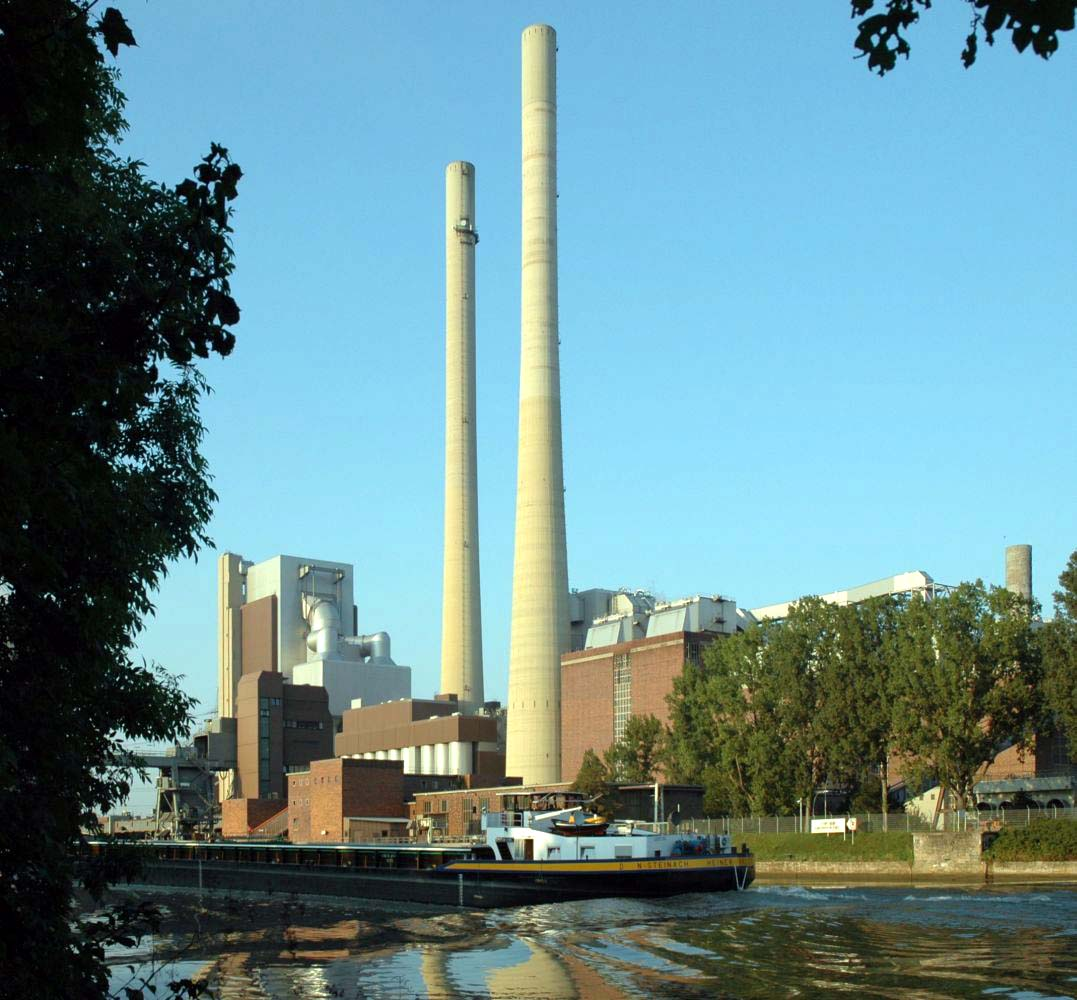
- Heilbronn Power Station seen from river Neckar side
- Country: Germany
- Location: Heilbronn
- Coordinates: 49°10′38″N 9°12′23″E
- Status: Operational
- Commission date: 1955
- Owner: EnBW
- Operator: EnBW

Thermal power station
- Primary fuel: Coal

Power generation
- Units operational: 2 X 65 MW (ret); 2 X 110 MW (ret); 2 X 125 MW; 1 X 760 MW
- Make and model: AEG; BBC; Siemens
- Nameplate capacity: 1,360 MW

External links
- Commons: Related media on Commons

Heilbronn Power Station is a coal-fired power station in Heilbronn, Germany. It is operated by EnBW Kraftwerke AG, until 1997 by EVS, and has seven units. Specifically, Unit 7 is the largest coal-fired unit used by EnBW. The capacity of the three units is 950 MW, two units with a capacity of approx. 200 MW are in cold reserve. The power station's two flue gas stacks are the highest structures in Heilbronn and are recognizable as landmarks from far away.

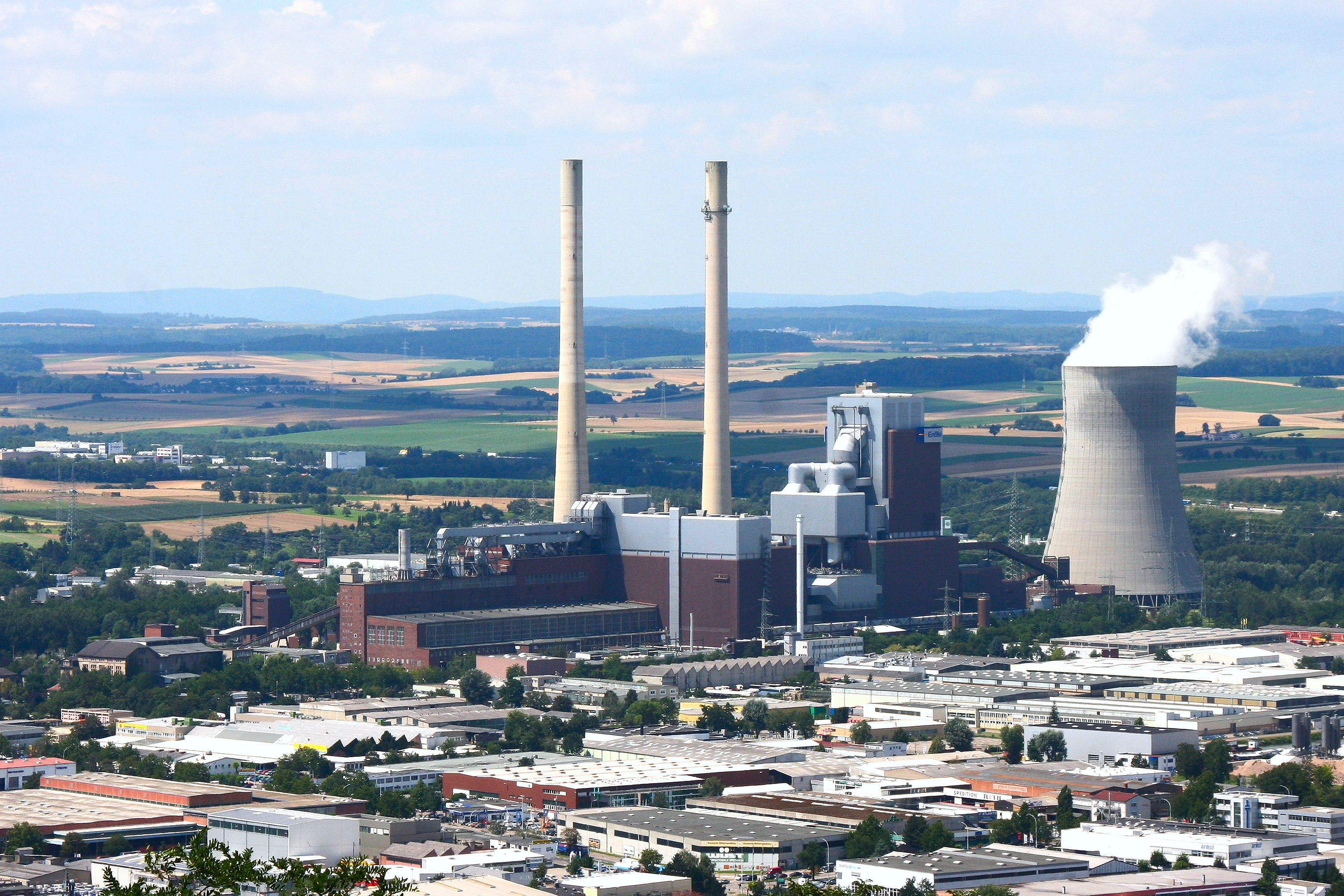
Heilbronn Power Station seen from the East
