= Trappensee =

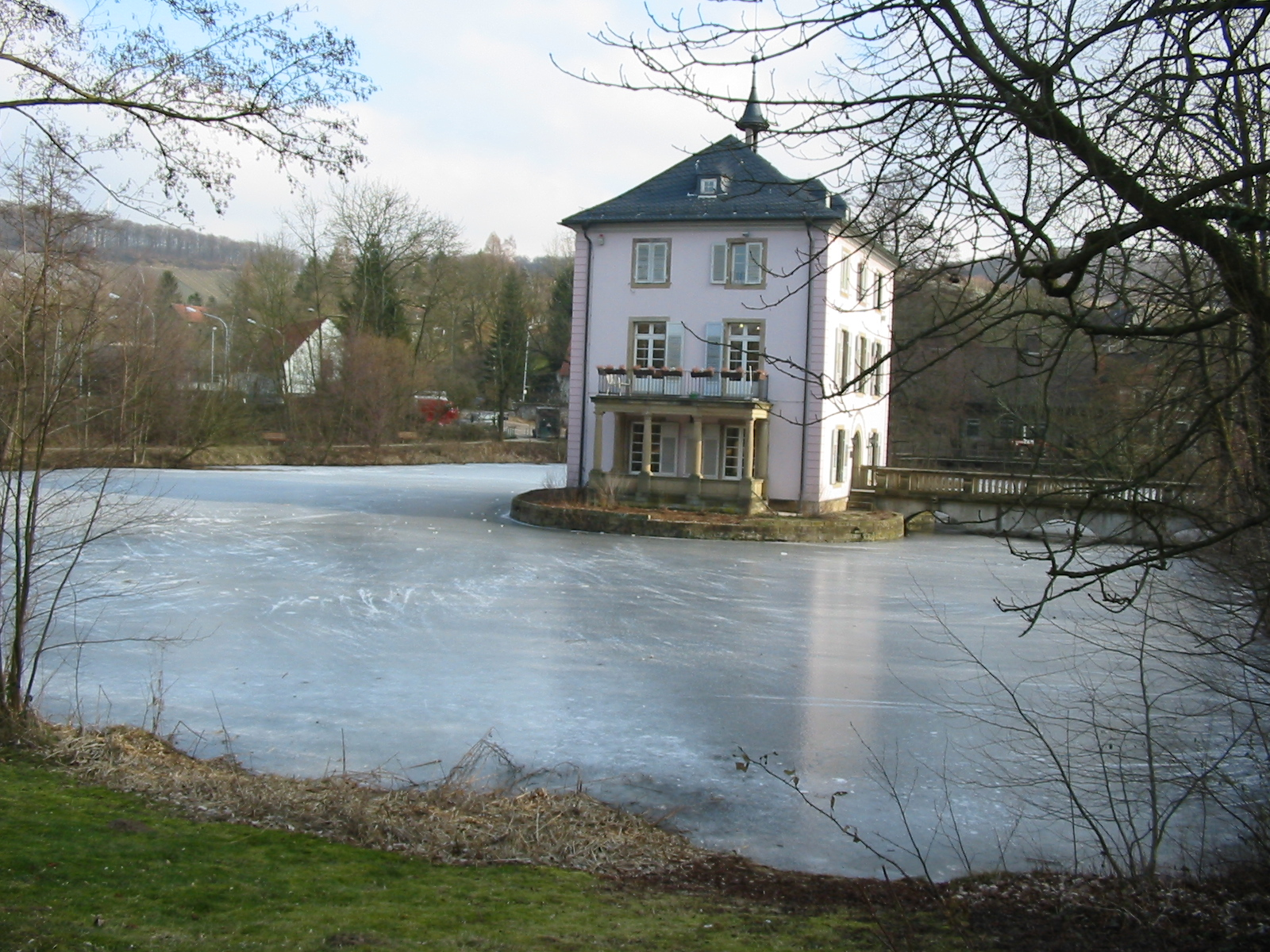
- Trappensee in winter

- Location within Germany
- Location: Baden-Wuerttemberg, Germany
- Coordinates: 49°08′20″N 9°15′13″E
- Type: lake

Trappensee is a small lake in the eastern city of Heilbronn in northern Baden-Wuerttemberg, Baden-Wuerttemberg, Germany. It is approximately 2 kilometres (1.2 mi) east of the city center. In the middle of the lake there is the Trappensee castle, a water castle that dates back to the 16th century and was rebuilt in its current shape in the 18th century.
