= Heilbronn-Frankenbach =

Coordinates: 49°09′40″N 9°10′18″E

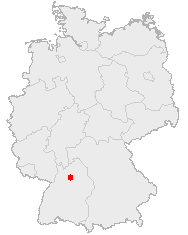
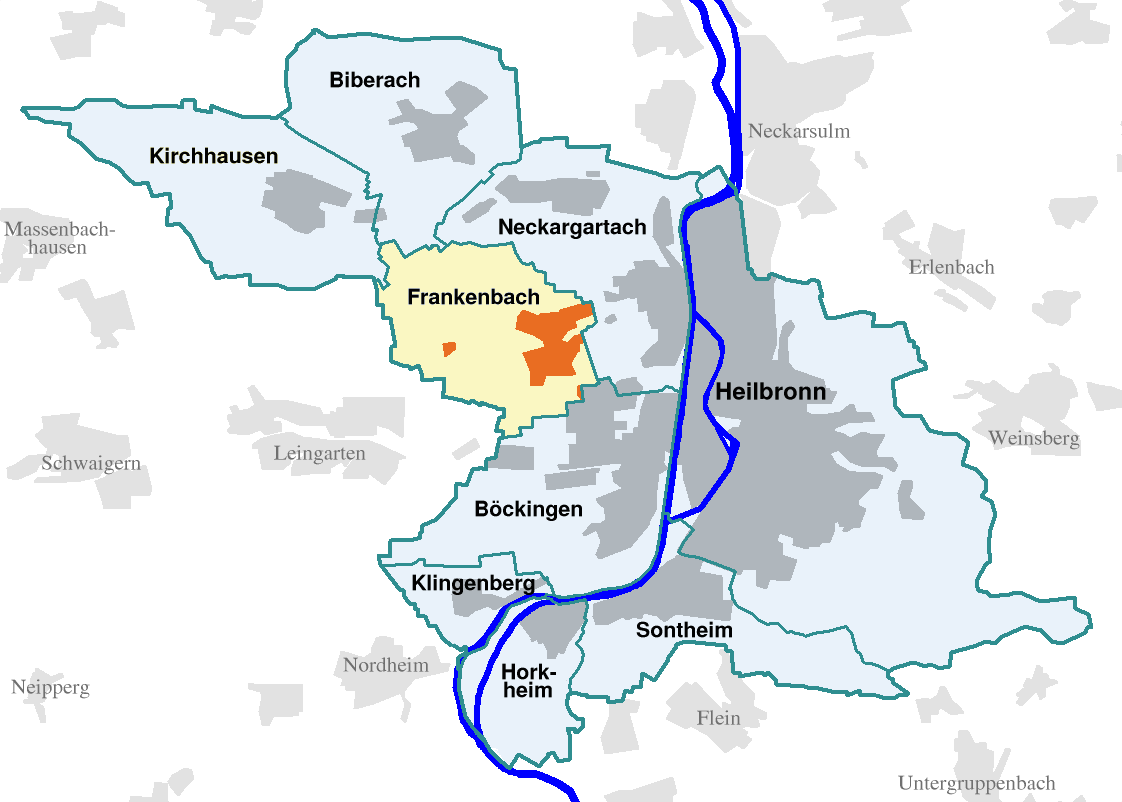
coat of arms	Location
Wappen des Stadtteils Frankenbach
Main facts
Bundesland:	Baden-Württemberg
city:	Heilbronn
Coordinates:	49° 10' N, 09° 10' E
population:	ca. 5597 (2006)
Address of the official-administration:	Speyerer Straße 13; 74078 Heilbronn
position

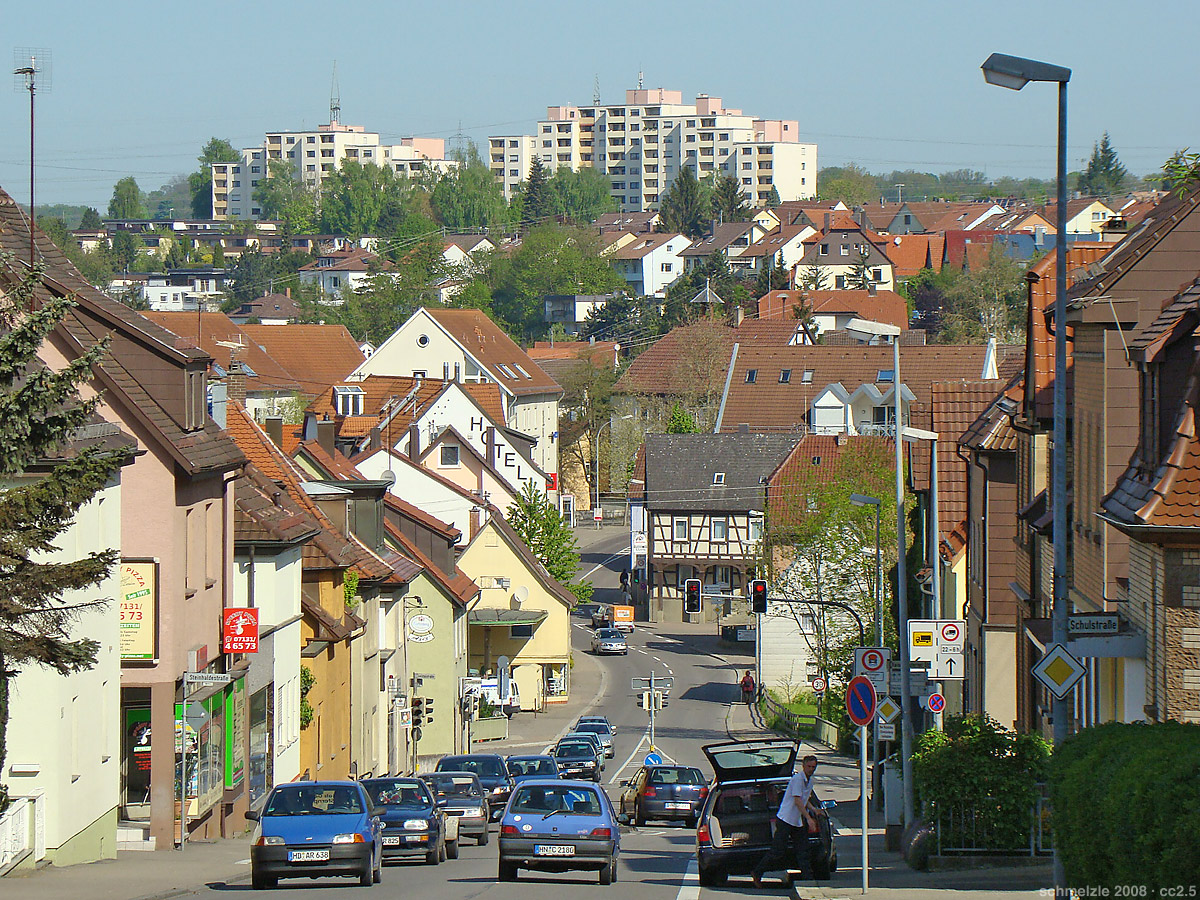
View over Frankenbach

Frankenbach (German: [ˈfʁaŋkn̩bax]) has been a borough of Heilbronn, Baden-Wüttemberg, since 1974. It is situated in the North-West, about 4.5 kilometres as crow flies from the centre.

Frankenbach was first mentioned in 766 and belonged to Heilbronn from the early 15th century. The St. Albans church was mentioned first in 1472 and became a Protestant church along with the city of Heilbronn during the Protestant Reformation. The catholic St. Johannes church was built in 1972.
