= Heilbronn =

- City
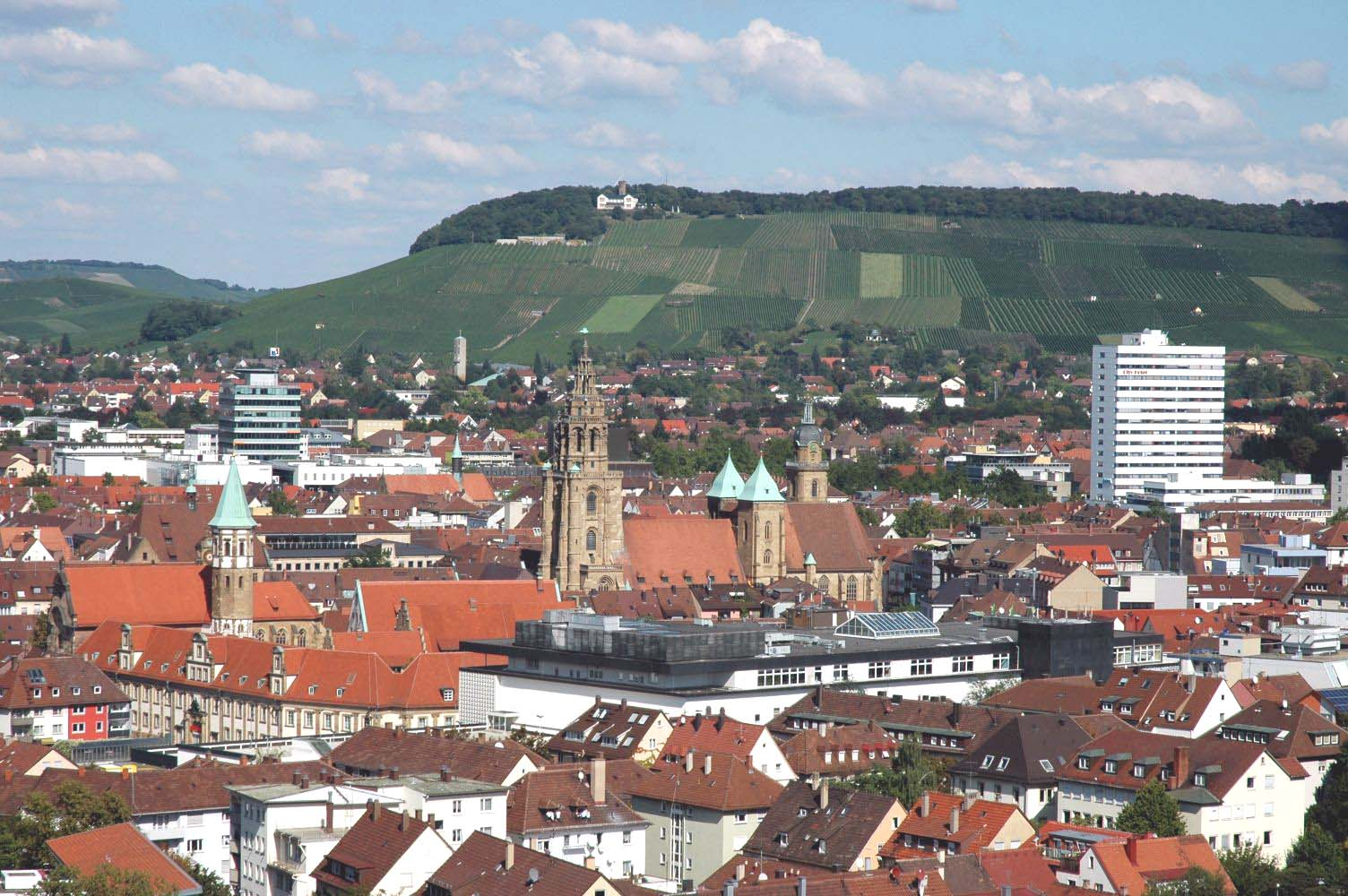
- View of the Heilbronn centre of town toward the Wartberg

- Flag Coat of arms

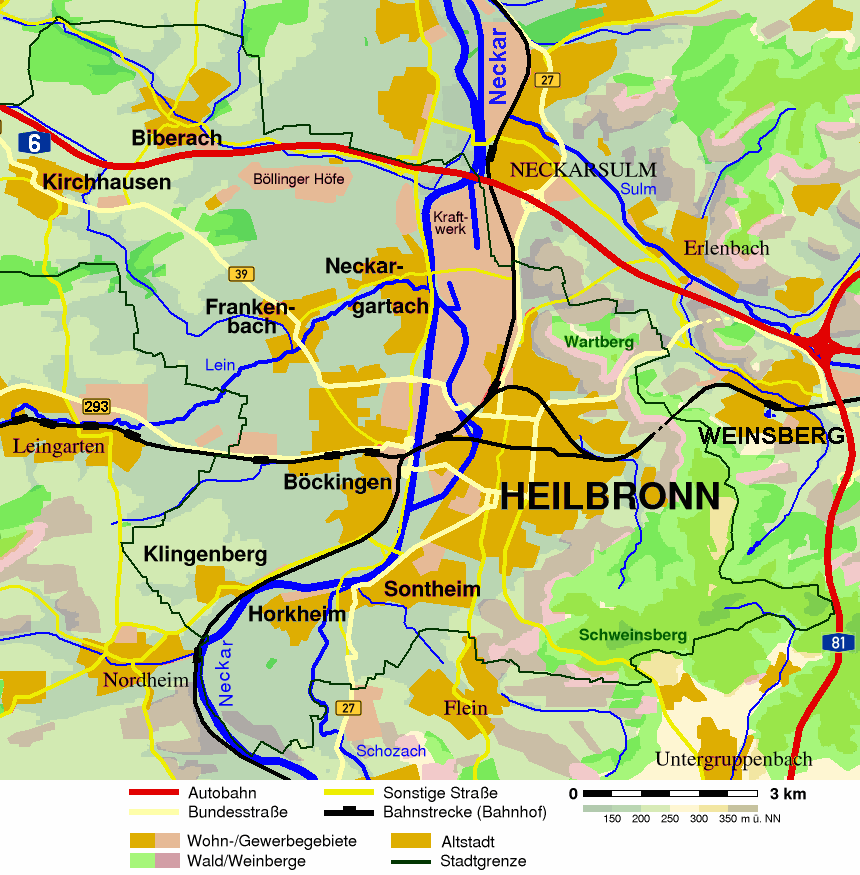
- Area map
- Interactive map of Heilbronn
- Location within Germany Location within Baden-Württemberg
- Coordinates: 49°9′N 9°13′E
- Country: Germany
- State: Baden-Württemberg
- Admin. region: Stuttgart
- District: Urban district
- Subdivisions: 9 Stadtteile

Government
  - Mayor (2022–30): Harry Mergel (SPD)

Area
  - Total: 99.89 km^{2} (38.57 sq mi)
- Elevation: 157 m (515 ft)

Population (2025-12-31)
  - Total: 132,516
  - Density: 1,327/km^{2} (3,436/sq mi)
- Time zone: UTC+01:00 (CET)
  - Summer (DST): UTC+02:00 (CEST)
- Postal codes: 74072–74081
- Dialling codes: 07131, 07066
- Vehicle registration: HN
- Website: heilbronn.de

Heilbronn (German: [haɪlˈbʁɔn]) is a city in northern Baden-Württemberg, Germany.

From the late Middle Ages on, it developed into an important trading centre. At the beginning of the 19th century, Heilbronn became one of the centres of early industrialisation in Württemberg. Heilbronn's old town was completely destroyed during the air raid of 4 December 1944 and rebuilt in the 1950s. Today Heilbronn is the economic centre of the Heilbronn-Franken region.

Heilbronn is known for its wine industry and is nicknamed Käthchenstadt, after Heinrich von Kleist's Das Käthchen von Heilbronn.

In October 2025, Heilbronn was named the European Green Capital for 2027.

== Geography ==
Heilbronn is located in the northern corner of the Neckar basin at the bottom of the Wartberg (308 m). It occupies both banks of the Neckar, and the highest spot inside city limits is the Schweinsberg with a height of 372 meters. Heilbronn is adjacent to the Swabian-Franconian Forest Nature Park and is surrounded by vineyards.

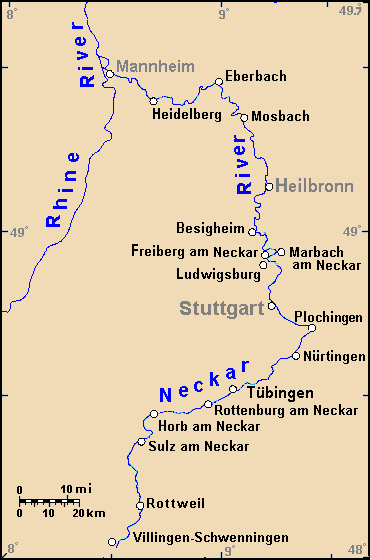
Heilbronn (upper right) on the Neckar River, in southwest Germany

Heilbronn and its surroundings are located in the northern part of the larger Stuttgart metropolitan area. The city is the economic center of the Heilbronn-Franken region and is one of fourteen such cities in the Baden-Württemberg master plan of 2002. It also serves Abstatt, Bad Rappenau, Bad Wimpfen, Beilstein, Brackenheim, Cleebronn, Eberstatt, Ellhofen, Eppingen, Flein, Gemmingen, Güglingen, Ilsfeld, Ittlingen, Kirchardt, Lauffen am Neckar, Lehrensteinsfeld, Leingarten, Löwenstein, Massenbachhausen, Neckarwestheim, Nordheim, Obersulm, Pfaffenhofen, Schwaigern, Siegelsbach, Talheim, Untergruppenbach, Weinsberg, Wüstenrot, and Zaberfeld as a regional economic centre.

=== Neighboring communities ===
Heilbronn shares a border with the following cities and towns, all part of Heilbronn County and listed here clockwise from the North: Bad Wimpfen, Neckarsulm, Erlenbach, Weinsberg, Lehrensteinsfeld, Untergruppenbach, Flein, Talheim, Lauffen am Neckar, Nordheim, Leingarten, Schwaigern, Massenbachhausen and Bad Rappenau.

=== Boroughs ===
The city is divided into nine boroughs:

- 001: Heilbronn itself
- 002: Böckingen
- 003: Neckargartach
- 004: Sontheim
- 005: Klingenberg
- 006: Frankenbach
- 007: Kirchhausen
- 008: Biberach
- 009: Horkheim

=== Climate ===
Climate data for Heillbronn (1991-2020)
Month	Jan	Feb	Mar	Apr	May	Jun	Jul	Aug	Sep	Oct	Nov	Dec	Year
Daily mean °C (°F)	2.2 (36.0)	3.0 (37.4)	6.8 (44.2)	11.0 (51.8)	15.1 (59.2)	18.5 (65.3)	20.2 (68.4)	19.7 (67.5)	15.2 (59.4)	10.0 (50.0)	6.0 (42.8)	3.0 (37.4)	10.9 (51.6)
Average precipitation mm (inches)	52.2 (2.06)	45.9 (1.81)	50.8 (2.00)	39.0 (1.54)	71.9 (2.83)	66.0 (2.60)	77.6 (3.06)	65.1 (2.56)	57.1 (2.25)	62.1 (2.44)	57.7 (2.27)	66.5 (2.62)	711.9 (28.04)
Mean monthly sunshine hours	51.5	72.4	119.7	173.3	201.6	202.8	209	198.1	148	102	50.5	39.4	1,568.3
Source: Deutscher Wetterdienst

== History ==
=== Up to AD 1200 ===
The oldest traces of humans in and around Heilbronn date back to the Old Stone Age (30,000 BC). The fertile Neckar floodplains in the Heilbronn basin aided early settlement by farmers and ranchers. The city limits of present-day Heilbronn contain many sites of Bronze Age finds. Later on, but still before AD, the Celts already mined here for salt from brine.

Under Roman Emperor Domitian (AD 81–96) the Romans pushed east away from the Rhine and the outer boundary of the Roman Empire was set at the Neckar-Odenwald Limes. A castle in today's borough of Böckingen was part of that limes, and nearby numerous Roman villas and plantations were built. Around AD 150, the Neckar-Odenwald Limes became obsolete when the boundary of the Roman Empire was moved approximately 30 km (19 mi) to the east, where it was subsequently fortified with the construction of the Upper Germanic Limes complete with parapet and trenches.

Around 260, the Romans surrendered the limes, and the Alamanni became rulers of the Neckar basin. Between the 4th and 7th centuries, the area became part of the Frankish Empire, and the first settlement was built in the general vicinity of the present center of town.

In 741, Heilbronn is first mentioned in an official document of the Diocese of Würzburg as villa Helibrunna (together with a Michaelsbasilica), and in 841, King Louis the German set up court here for a period of time. The name Heilbrunna (healing well) hints to a well that is located not far from the basilica. In 1050, a significant settlement of Jews is noted in official documents, and the Codex of the monastery in Hirsau documented Heilbronn's right to hold market days and mint coins, mentioning its harbor and vineyards as well. The name of the city became a widespread Jewish surname in many varieties, see Heilprin, Halpern, and Halperin.

=== 1200–1500 ===
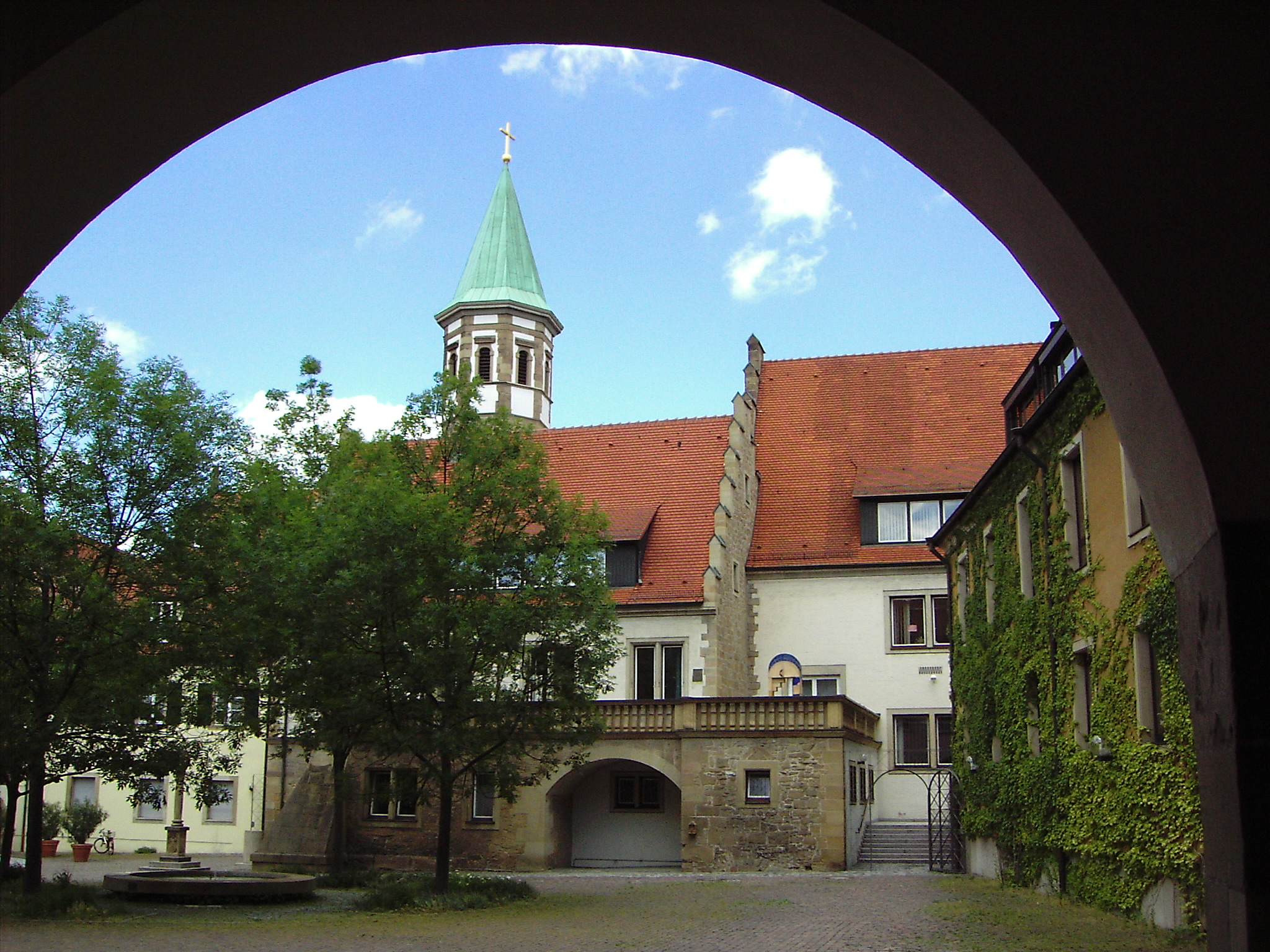
The Deutschhof

In 1225, Heilbronn was incorporated into the Hohenstaufen Empire as oppidum Heilecbrunnen. Oppidum signified a city fortified by parapet and trenches. Later during the 13th century, the Teutonic Knights obtained ownership of a large area south of Heilbronn which would remain owned by that order until German Mediatisation in 1805. Starting in 1268, the order built the Deutschhof there as one of its residences. The church building of the order that was located on the premises was modified and expanded several times: First in 1350 it was expanded (Gothic), then it was remodeled in 1719 (Baroque), and in 1977, it was consecrated as a cathedral.

After the demise of the Staufen dynasty, King Rudolf I returned city status to Heilbronn in 1281 and installed a regal advocate to rule the city. In addition to the advocate he put a council in place that was headed up by a mayor. Around 1300, the first city hall was erected in the market place and the Kilianskirche (built on the foundation of the Michaelsbasilica) was expanded. The Neckar privilege gave the city the right to modify the flow of the river in 1333, which meant it now had the right to construct dams, harbors and mills. Because of the infrastructure thus created, during the 14th century Heilbronn grew attractive to merchants and craftspeople, who now demanded the right to determine their own fate.

In 1371, Charles IV, Holy Roman Emperor, issued a new charter to the city. Now Heilbronn needed to answer only to the Emperor and as such was an Imperial Free City. Craftspeople and merchants were now represented in its council and the villages of Böckingen, Flein, Frankenbach and Neckargartach became part of Heilbronn's territory.

As an Imperial Free City Heilbronn was threatened by the ambitious House of Württemberg. A relationship with the Holy Roman Emperor and a treaty with the Electorate of the Palatinate in effect from 1417 to 1622 strengthened Heilbronn's position and kept the House of Württemberg at bay. The political stability enjoyed by the city during the 15th century enabled it to expand, and many of its historic structures, such as the Kilianskirche (1455–60), trace their origins to that era.

=== 1500–1700 ===
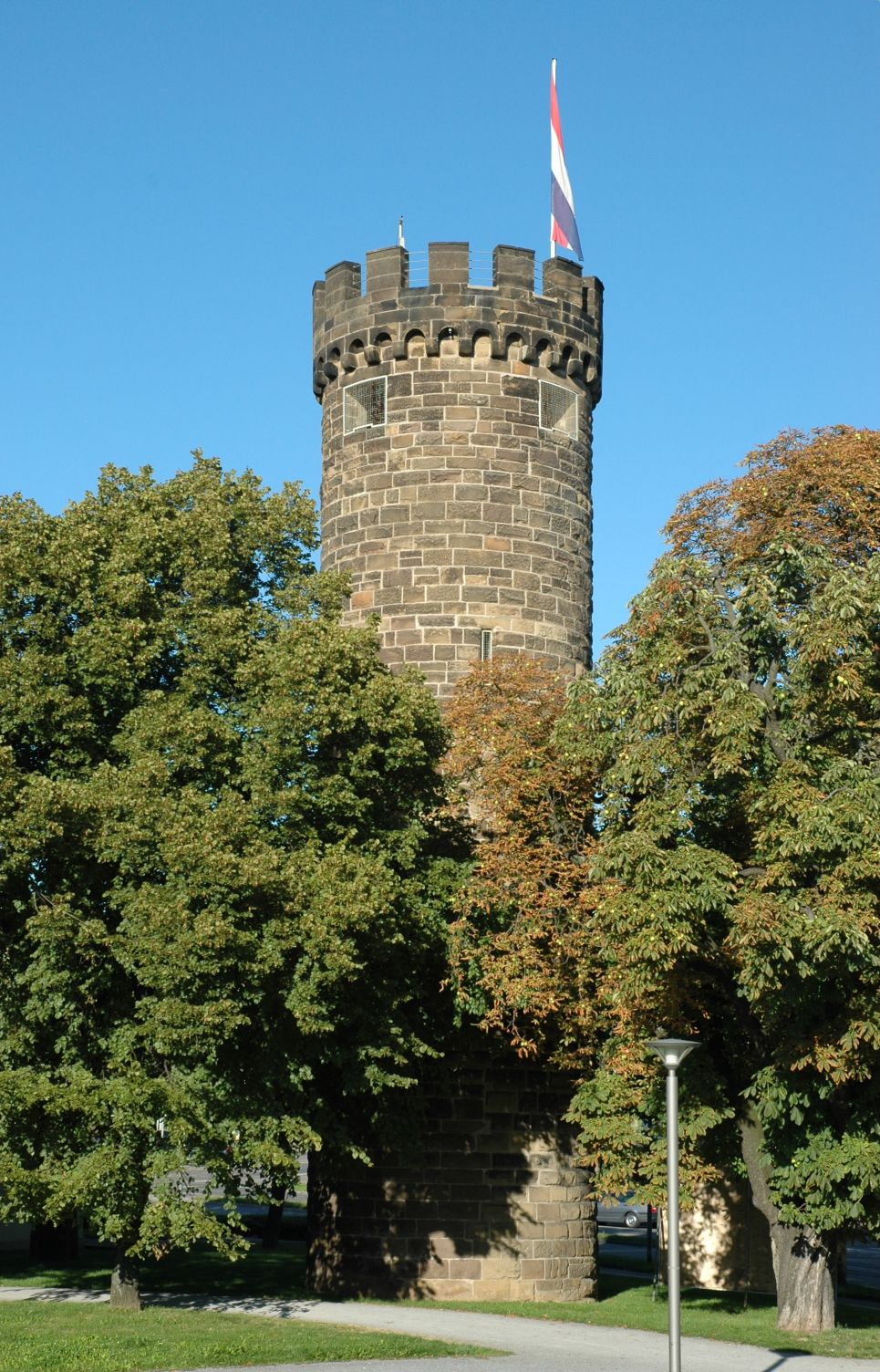
Bollwerksturm

Götz von Berlichingen spent three years in "knightly custody" in Heilbronn starting in 1519 and even spent a night in the tower of the bastion. That same year people first took note of the pub owner Jäcklein Rohrbach who with accomplices would later kill the executor of Böckingen. After he had spent some time in the Hohenlohe Plains and collected similarly minded characters around him, he returned to Heilbronn in April 1525 just as the German Peasants' War was getting into full swing. On April 16 the peasants killed many of the nobles in Weinsberg and on April 18 the Heilbronn monastery of the Order of Our Lady of Mt. Carmel was attacked and ransacked. The city opened its gates in response to demands of the peasants and consequently more churches and municipal institutions were robbed the next day. For about a month Heilbronn remained under the control of rebellious peasants. And even though Johann Lachmann, later a church reformer, had attempted to mediate, the peasants did not leave the city until one of their armies was defeated on May 12, 1525, in Böblingen. Their leader Rohrbach was executed on May 21, 1525, in Neckargartach and his home town of Böckingen was partially burnt to the ground in punishment.

In 1528, the replacement of the mayor by Hans Riesser, a Protestant, brought on the previously delayed Reformation and through the efforts of Reformer Lachmann schools and healthcare were also reorganized. In 1529 the Kilianskirche (church tower of the Kilianskirche) was completed. It was the first important religious building of the Renaissance in Germany. The year 1530 brought about the acceptance of the Augsburg Confession by city council and residents and the Heilbronn Catechism of 1536 is the second oldest catechism in the Protestant Church. In 1538 Heilbronn joined the Schmalkaldic League but by 1546 squabbles between troops of the Schmalkaldic League and those of the Emperor Charles V escalated into battles that were won by the Emperor. As a result, Charles V spent Christmas 1546 in Heilbronn to attend the ensuing criminal proceedings. It is also Charles V who in 1522 changed the charter of the city and this charter survived almost unscathed until 1803.

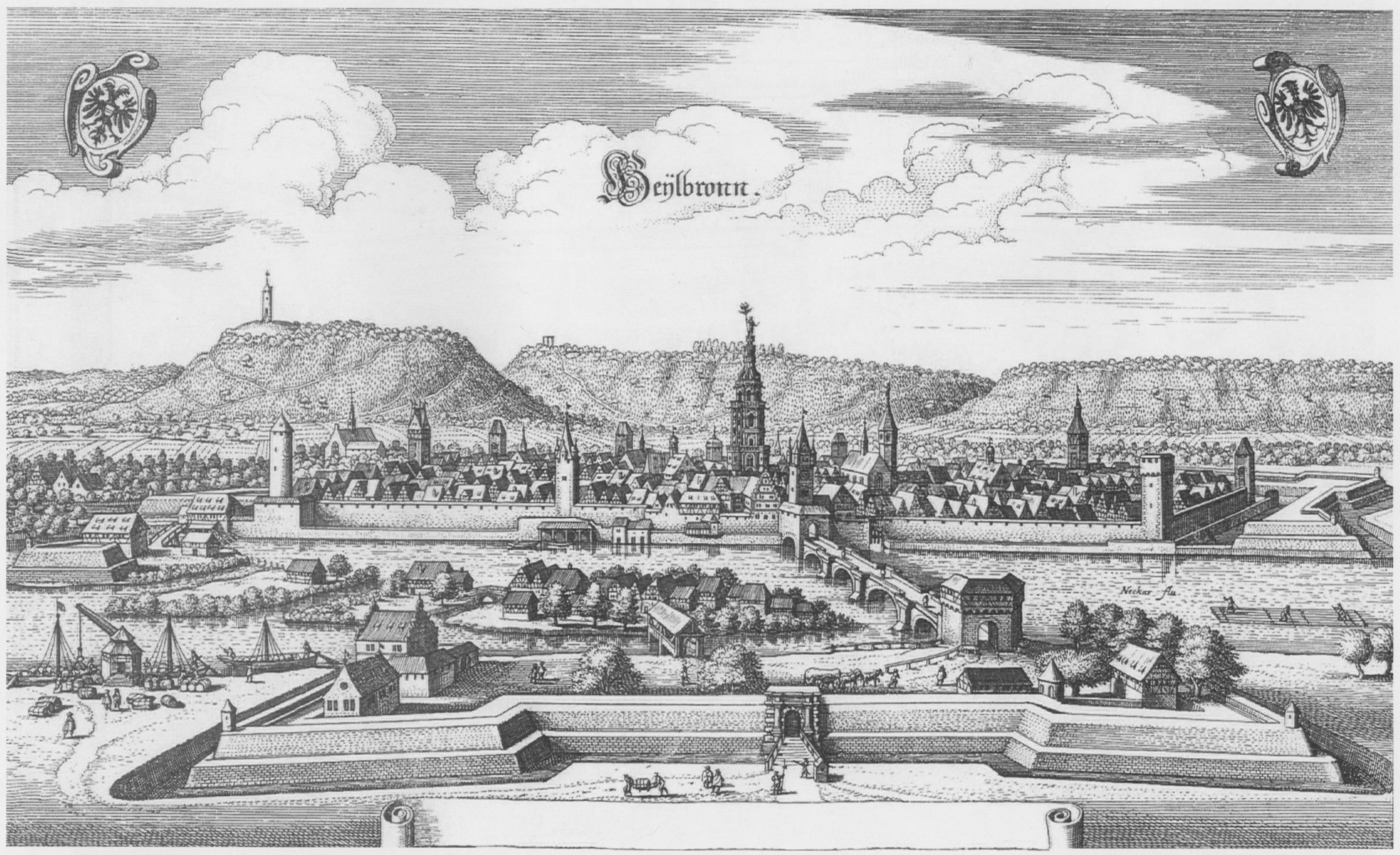
Heilbronn in 1643. Engraving by Matthäus Merian

During the Thirty Years' War the city and surrounding villages suffered badly. After the battle of Wimpfen in 1622, Neckargartach was burnt to the ground. In 1631 Heilbronn was occupied by imperial troops but the same year the Swedes succeeded in conquering the city. From 1644 through 1647, Heilbronn was again part of the Holy Roman Empire, but then French troops moved in and later those of the Electorate of the Palatinate. The city was not free of occupying forces until four years after the Peace of Westphalia of 1648. But already in the 1670s the city again became the stage for armed manoeuvres, until it was occupied by French troops in 1688. But while that occupation of the city only lasted several months, the French were only persuaded to leave the surrounding areas in 1693, after a large defensive army had been put into the field and fortifications had been erected.

=== 1700–1900 ===
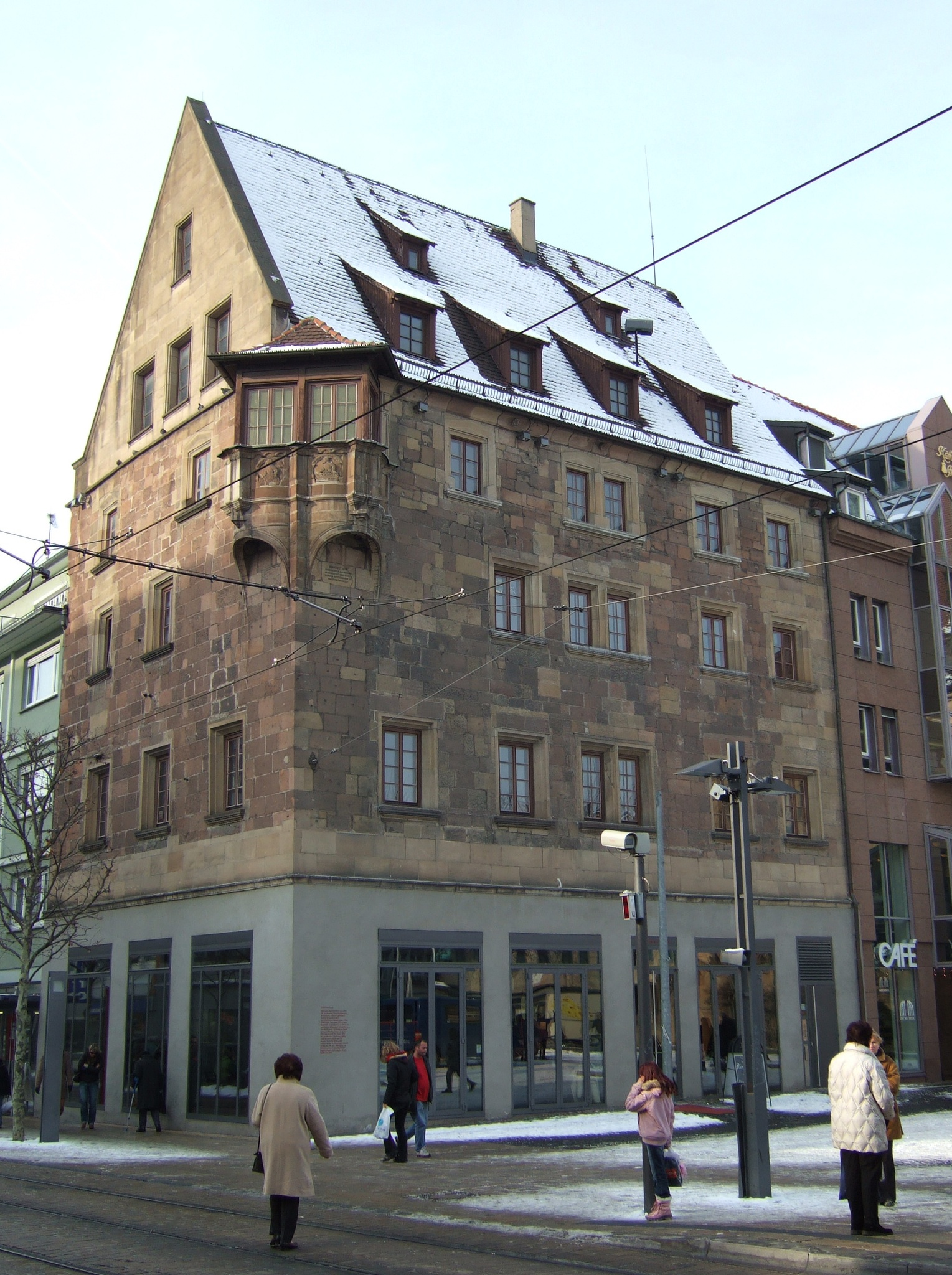
Käthchenhaus

During the 18th century, archives suggest all members of the city council enjoyed some sort of formal education; Schiller and Goethe came to visit; and elaborate buildings were being constructed in the Rococo style.

On September 9, 1802, Heilbronn lost its status as an Imperial Free City when the troops of Duke Friedrich I of Württemberg arrived. The duke had conceded the left bank of the Rhine to France during the French Revolutionary Wars but had been compensated with areas on the right bank. This is how Heilbronn and other former Imperial Free Cities became part of Württemberg in 1803. Heilbronn became the seat of an Oberamt (district), and the four Imperial Free villages became separate communities within the district. In 1806 the Duchy of Württemberg became the Kingdom of Württemberg.

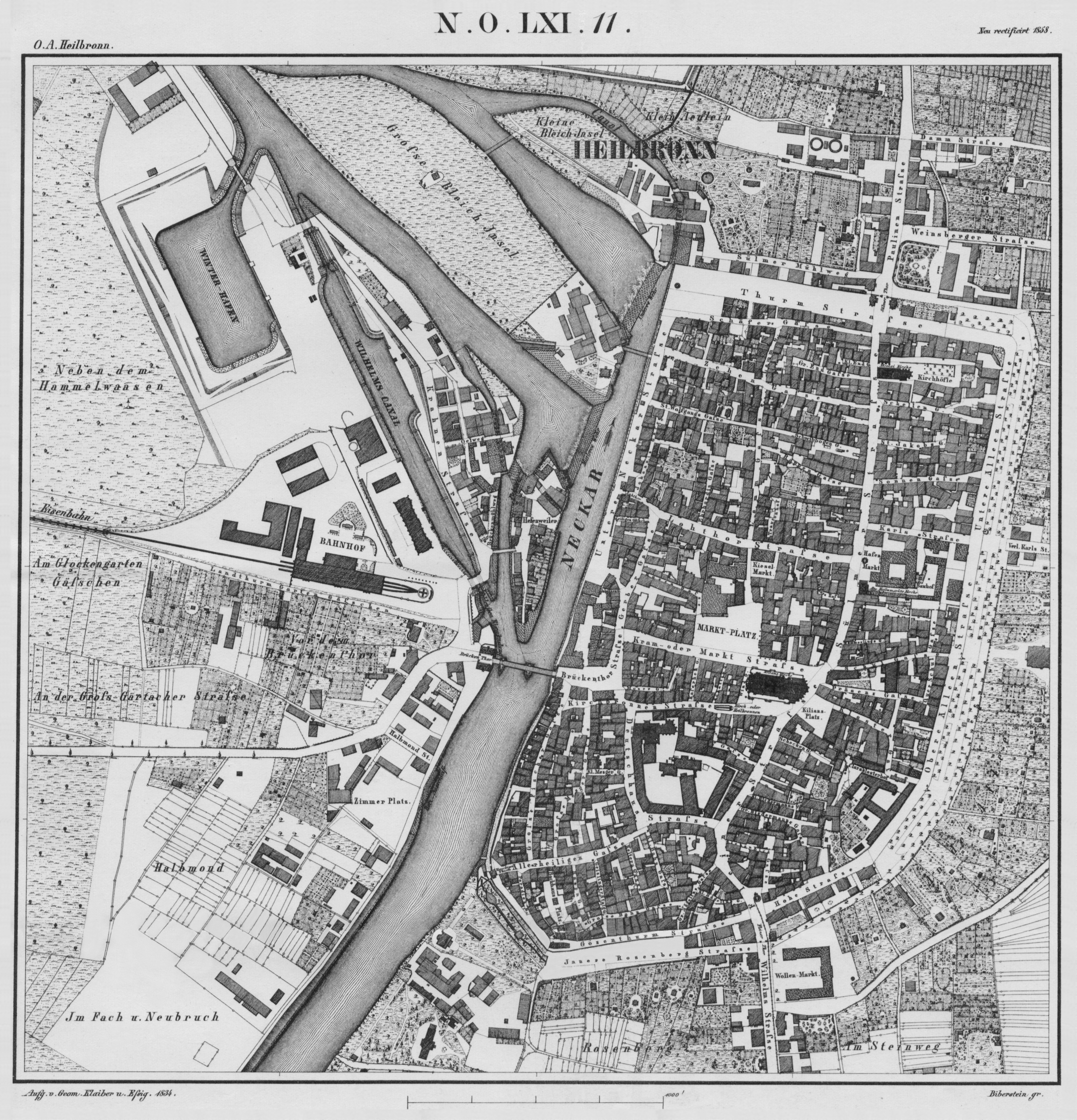
Plan of Heilbronn, 1858

In 1815, Heilbronn again became a staging area for major armies ahead of the campaign against Napoleon, and 10,000 troops paraded in front of Emperor Franz of Austria and more than one hundred German princes and generals in the Theresienwiese. Tsar Alexander I of Russia met in Heilbronn with the Baltic Baroness Juliane von Krüdener, who talked him into founding the "Holy Alliance".

Industrialization arrived in 1820. When the first train lines were placed in service in Württemberg, Heilbronn was at the end of the line of the northern branch that connected Heilbronn with Stuttgart and further fueled industrialization.

For a while Heilbronn suffered from the upheavals of the Baden Revolution that its civil guard participated in. During that time the 8th infantry regiment switched sides and joined the revolutionaries until it was subsequently disarmed and force-transferred out of the area.

In 1849, the Hoerner Bank, one of the oldest still functioning banks in Germany, was founded in Heilbronn.

Heilbronn became part of the German Empire in 1871 during the unification of Germany.

In the 1860s the city's train tracks were extended to Heidelberg via Bad Wimpfen, to Würzburg via Osterburken, and to Crailsheim (and later on to Nuremberg) via Schwäbisch Hall. In 1880, the Kraichgau line was completed and created an important connection towards Karlsruhe, and by the end of the 19th century, Heilbronn had become an important hub, second in Wuerttemburg to Stuttgart in industrial output.

The year 1892 brought a connection to the power plant in Lauffen; thus Heilbronn became the first city in the world to enjoy long-distance electric power.

=== 1900–1945 ===
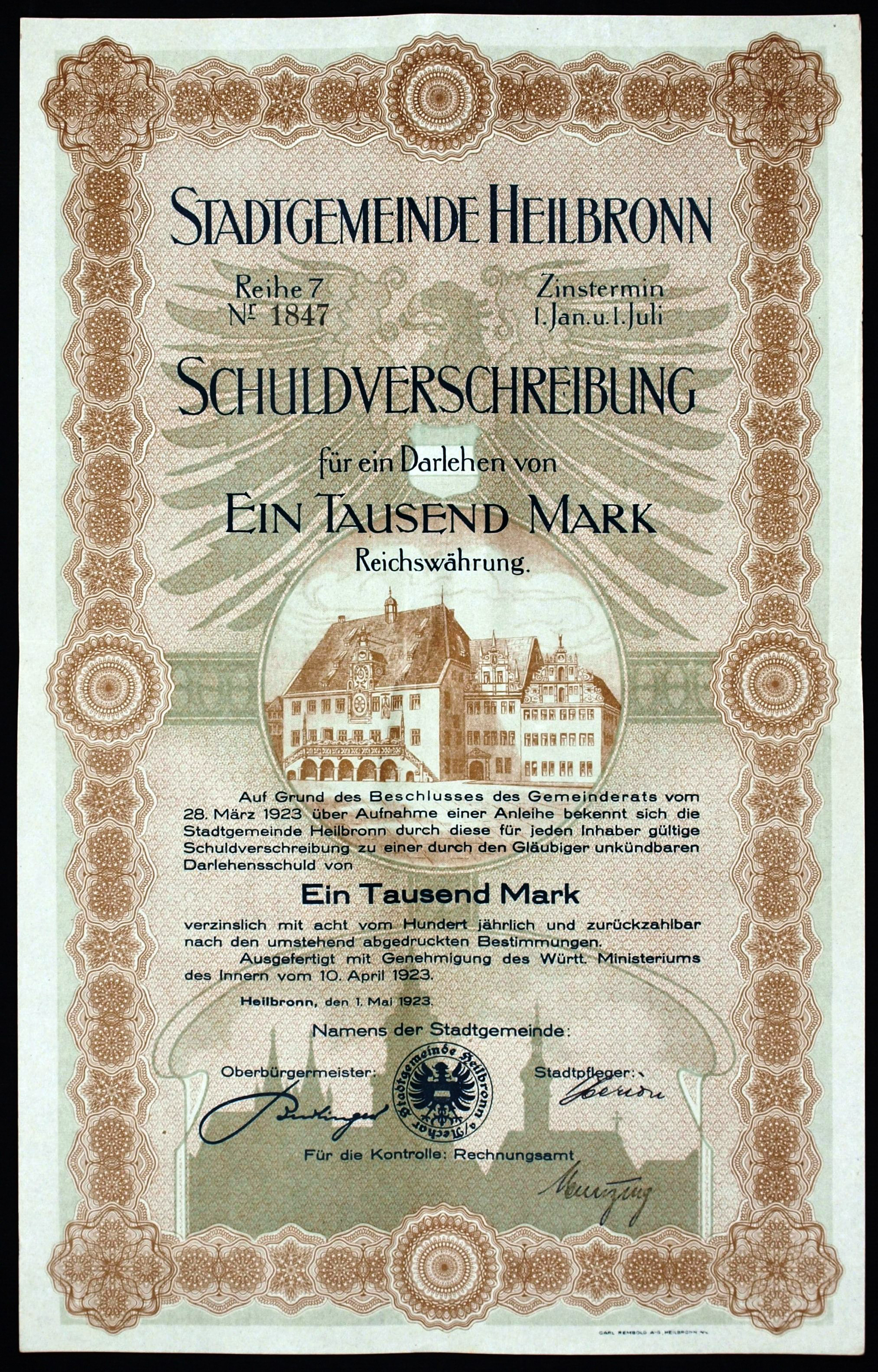
Bond of the Municipality Heilbronn, issued on April 10, 1923

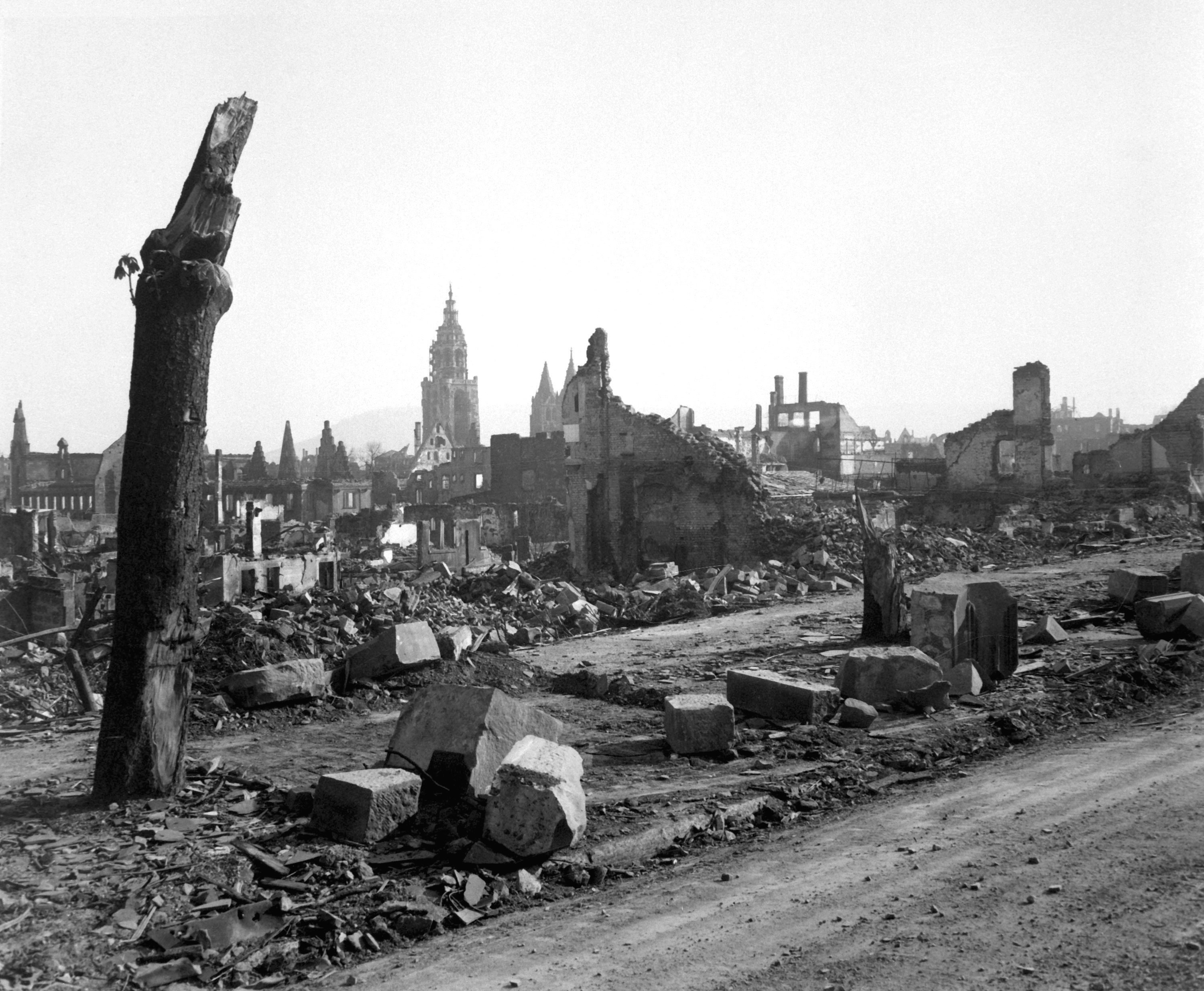
Ruins in Heilbronn in 1945

With the dissolution of monarchy in the German Reich as a result of World War I, Heilbronn became part of the Free People's State of Württemberg in 1918.

After almost a century of economic boom and growth of the local industry Heilbronn's citizenry included many labourers. The city came to be known as a "red hot spot"; numerous worker and sports clubs were begun. Already prior to World War I the SPD cornered the majority of the vote and stayed that course during the Weimar Republic. At his visit to the city on May 15, 1926, Hitler was clearly not welcome by everyone, and several people were injured when a man was mistaken for Hitler and attacked. Hitler himself was able to give his speech in the city's community center Harmonie, but the SPD had the majority in Heilbronn over the NSDAP as late as the elections on March 5, 1933.

Richard Drauz, who had been born into a respected Heilbronn family, became Heilbronn's NSDAP Kreisleiter (District Leader) in 1932. He was also elected to the Reichstag from 1933 on and pushed hard for the Gleichschaltung of the Heilbronn clubs and press in Nazi Germany.

On July 28, 1935, the port was opened in a canal off the Neckar, and 1936 saw the Autobahn between Heilbronn and Stuttgart completed. Economy and infrastructure were booming in Württemberg, and Heilbronn was at the logistic centre of it all. As the result of a district reform on October 1, 1938, Heilbronn became the seat of the newly created Heilbronn County and regained independent city status. At the same time the previously independent communities of Böckingen, Sontheim, and Neckargartach were annexed, and with 72,000 residents Heilbronn then was the second largest city in Württemberg. The port turned into an important transfer station on the Neckar and one of the ten largest interior ports in the country.

On November 10, 1938, the Heilbronn synagogue was destroyed during the Kristallnacht. Soon thereafter the Jewish community was all but eliminated.

Starting in 1942 during World War II, the salt mines in and around Heilbronn were used to store art and artifacts from Germany, France, and Italy. Similarly, important producers of the war industry were moved into the mine shafts. The expansion of the shafts was undertaken by labour brigades of the concentration camp branches in Kochendorf and Neckargartach. From Heilbronn all the way to Neckarelz numerous subterraneous complexes, some of them gigantic, were constructed; on November 20, 1942, the Heilbronn Bureau of Labour had 8,000 forced labourers registered in its district.

In 1940 allied air raids began, and the city and its surrounding area were hit about 20 times with minor damage. On September 10, 1944, a raid by the allies targeted the city specifically, in particular the Böckingen train transfer station. As a result of 1,168 bombs dropped that day, 281 residents died. The city was carpet-bombed from the southern quarter all the way to the Kilianskirche in the center of town. The church was burnt out.

After a ten-day battle, with the allies advancing over the strategically important Neckar crossings, the war ended for the destroyed city, and it was occupied by the U.S. Army on April 12, 1945. Local NSDAP leader Richard Drauz became a fugitive because of executions of American prisoners of war he had ordered in March 1945. He was eventually arrested, tried, and hanged by the Allies in Landsberg on December 4, 1946.

=== Second Half of the 20th Century ===
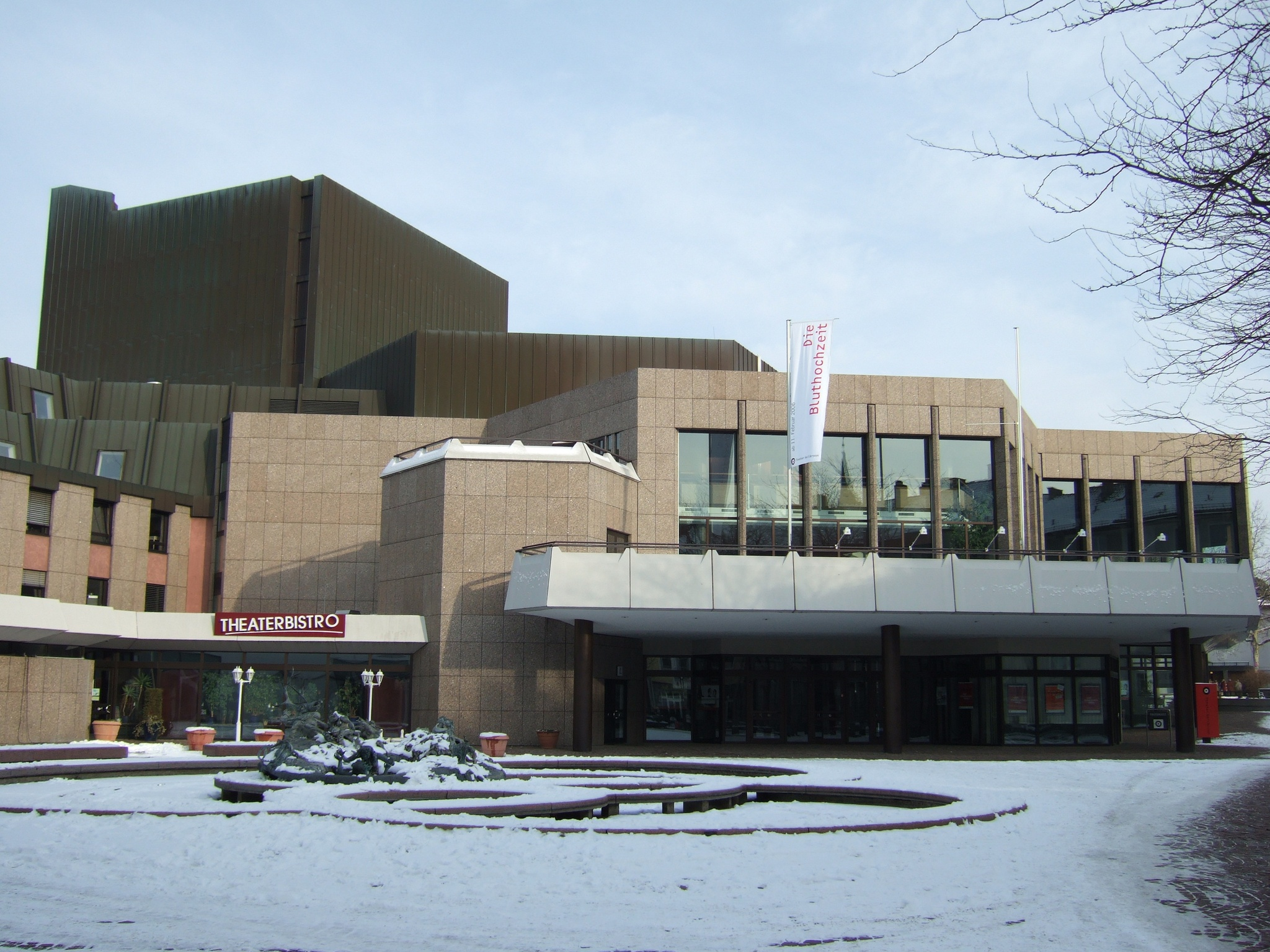
Stadttheater Heilbronn

After the war, Emil Beutinger, mayor until 1933, returned to office and began the formidable task of reconstruction that was subsequently continued by his successors Paul Metz and Paul Meyle. Milestones were the rededication of historic city hall in 1953 and the reopening of the community centre, Harmonie. Heilbronn was part of Württemberg-Baden until 1952, after which it became part of Baden-Württemberg.

After 1951, US troops were permanently stationed in Heilbronn. They used barracks built prior to World War II and added some structures of their own.

On April 15, 1954, during the Easter holiday 13 people from Heilbronn went missing in what is now known as the Dachstein hiking disaster.

The opening of the Autobahn A 6 from Heilbronn to Mannheim in 1968 was an important economic event. When the A 81 to Würzburg and the A 6 to Nuremberg was completed in 1974 and 1979, respectively, Heilbronn became an important logistical centre in southern Germany. As a result, many large companies opened offices in Heilbronn.

When Klingenberg became part of Heilbronn on January 1, 1970, the city's population exceeded 100,000 for the first time; thus Heilbronn attained "major city" (Großstadt) status. During the last district reform in the 1970s, Kirchhausen, Biberach, Frankenbach and Horkheim were incorporated into Heilbronn, and the city was reconfirmed as independent city and seat of Heilbronn County. It was also declared seat of the newly formed Franken region, now Heilbronn-Franken.

Also during the 1970s, the centre of the city was transformed into a pedestrian zone and the rededication of the city theatre in 1982 closed one of the largest holes left in the inner city from World War II.

Pursuant to the NATO Double-Track Decision of 1979, Pershing II intermediate-range nuclear missiles were stationed just uphill of Heilbronn in the Waldheide. This made Heilbronn the only major city in Germany with atomic missiles inside its city limits — a fact that became front-page news during the missile accident on January 11, 1985. After the INF Treaty was signed in 1987, the missiles were removed.

In the 1980s, Heilbronn hosted Heimatttage and Landesgartenschau staged by the State of Baden-Württemberg.

=== 21st Century ===
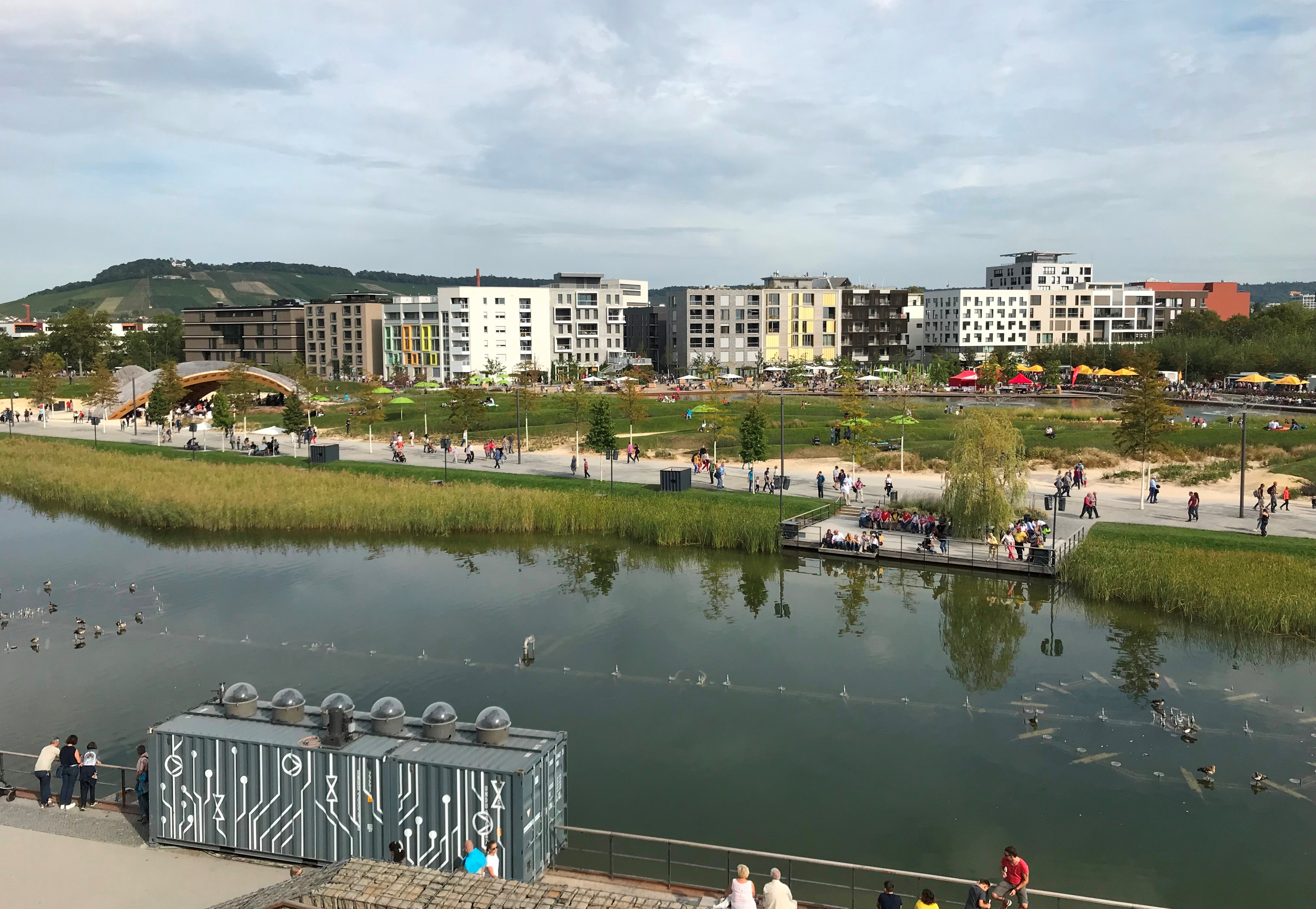
View of the Bundesgartenschau and the Neckarbogen

In 1998, Heilbronn was connected to the S-Bahn net with Karlsruhe. This further transformed the city centre, and an extension of the S-Bahn towards Öhringen opened on December 10, 2005, marking the completion of the east–west axis of the Baden-Wuerttemburg regional transportation system. In 2013, the north–south axis to Neckarsulm was opened.

Heilbronn won the European competition "Entente Florale 2000" on September 9, 2000, in Broughshane, Northern Ireland, and in 2005–06 the city became the first UNICEF children's city in Germany.

Late in 2005, Heilbronn was chosen to host the Bundesgartenschau in 2019. More than 2.3 million visitors came to the garden and city exhibition in 2019, which took place on a former commercial site of about 40 hectares located directly north of the main station. Now a part of the site is being developed into a new Urban district called Neckarbogen, where up to 3,500 people will live and 1,000 people will work in the future. The first buildings of the green and family-friendly quarter have been highly acclaimed and already received several awards.

Other major new buildings in the city area in recent years include two Neckar bridges, the two shopping centres Stadtgalerie and Klosterhof, the experimenta Science Center and the Bildungscampus.

In 2021, the State of Baden-Wuerttemberg decides to locate its new innovation park artificial intelligence in Heilbronn.

=== Religion ===
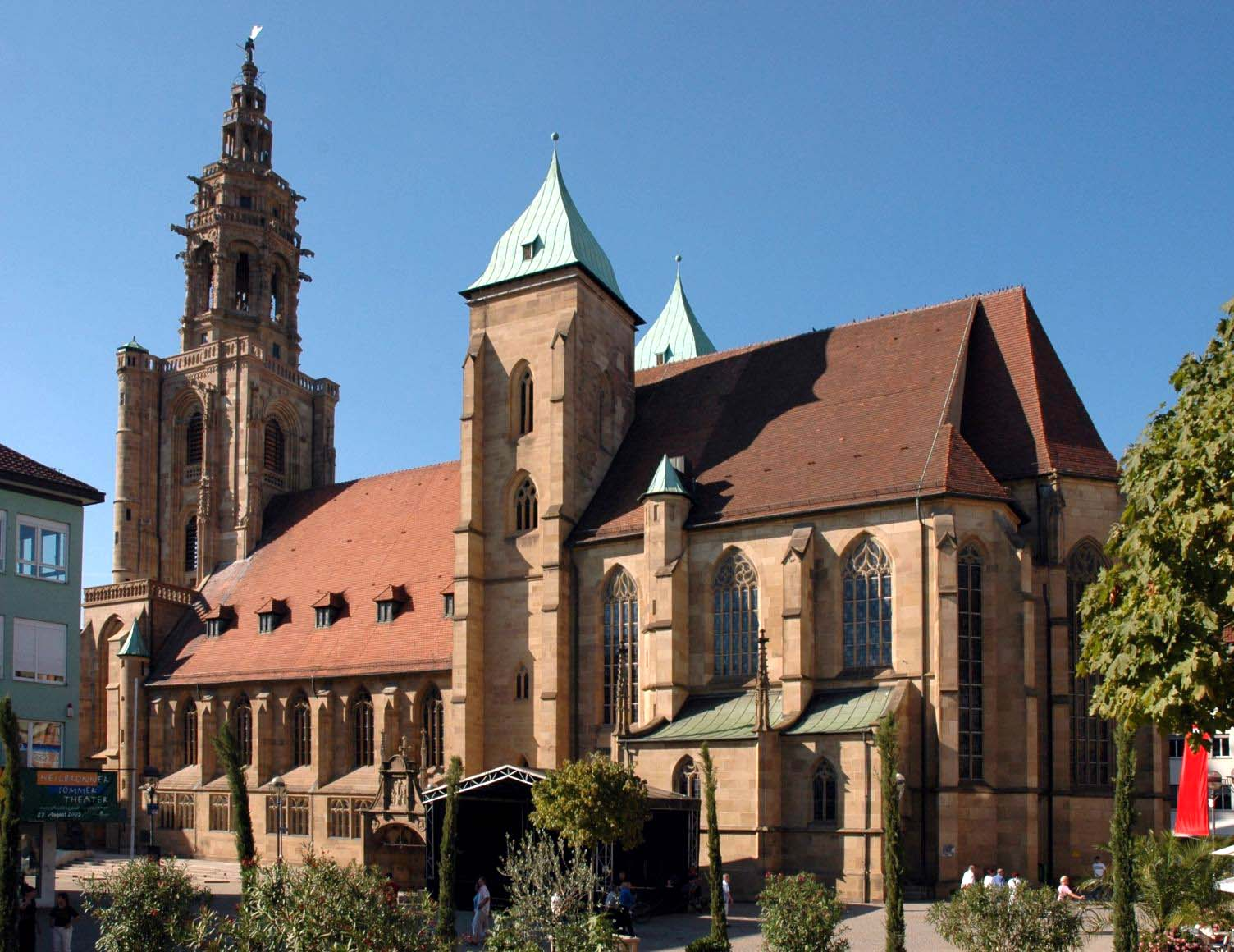
St. Kilian's Church, Heilbronn, as seen from the Kiliansplatz

Ever since the Franks under Chlodwig settled in the Neckar region around 500 the area has been predominantly Christian and when Heilbronn was first mentioned in an official document in 741 Christian Michaelsbasilica, present day's Kilianskirche, was mentioned along with the city. The Teutonic Knights constructed its church from the 13th century and both churches were continually expanded. They were joined later by other churches and cloisters in the city.

Around 1050 an important Jewish community was mentioned that had settled in what became known as the Judengasse (Lohtorstraße). In 1298, 143 Jews were killed during the Rintfleisch-Pogrom and in 1350 Jews suffered attacks again during a European epidemic of the Bubonic plague. The city's constitution required the council to include Jews, but already in the middle of the 15th century Jews were the target of vigilantes again until they were evicted from the city in 1490 with the blessings of Emperor Frederick III.

The common Jewish name Halpern, and many variants such as Alpert, derive from the name of this city Heilbronn, and the early Jewish community there.

While Heilbronn was part of the Diocese of Würzburg, the independent villages of Böckingen, Neckargartach and Frankenbach were attached to the Diocese of Worms. From 1514 on the Heilbronn native Johann Lachmann was caretaker of the parish in St. Kilian, in 1521 he became its preacher, in 1524 he converted to Lutheranism and proceeded to teach and lead the Reformation in Heilbronn against the wishes of both dioceses. After the Protestant Reformation of Heilbronn was complete the city remained Lutheran for centuries and the council and citizens accepted the Augsburg Confession without dissent. Catholics were no longer welcome, Jews were prohibited from settling in Heilbronn, and the city took part in the Protestation at Speyer on April 19, 1529 (the Protestation was the origin of the terms Protestant and Protestantism).

The Age of Enlightenment brought Heilbronn freedom of religion. From 1803 Jews were again permitted to settle in the city, Catholics also began to move back in and by the 1860s Jews were granted equal rights as Heilbronn citizens.

After the city became part of Württemberg in 1803 it also became seat of a deaconry and the Prelate or regional bishop of the Protestant State Church in Württemberg. To this day Protestants are in the majority in Heilbronn. The Catholic parishes belong to the Deacony Heilbronn and are part of the Diocese of Rottenburg-Stuttgart.

Around 1920 first groups of "Serious Bible Students" (now: Jehovah's Witnesses) formed. Their small community suffered from oppression during the Third Reich and many of its members died in concentration camps. Similarly, the Jewish community had to watch as its colossal synagogue went up in flames and its 350 members were subsequently all but extinguished. Jehovah's Witnesses built a first meeting room in Heilbronn in 1953 and many more have been added since then.

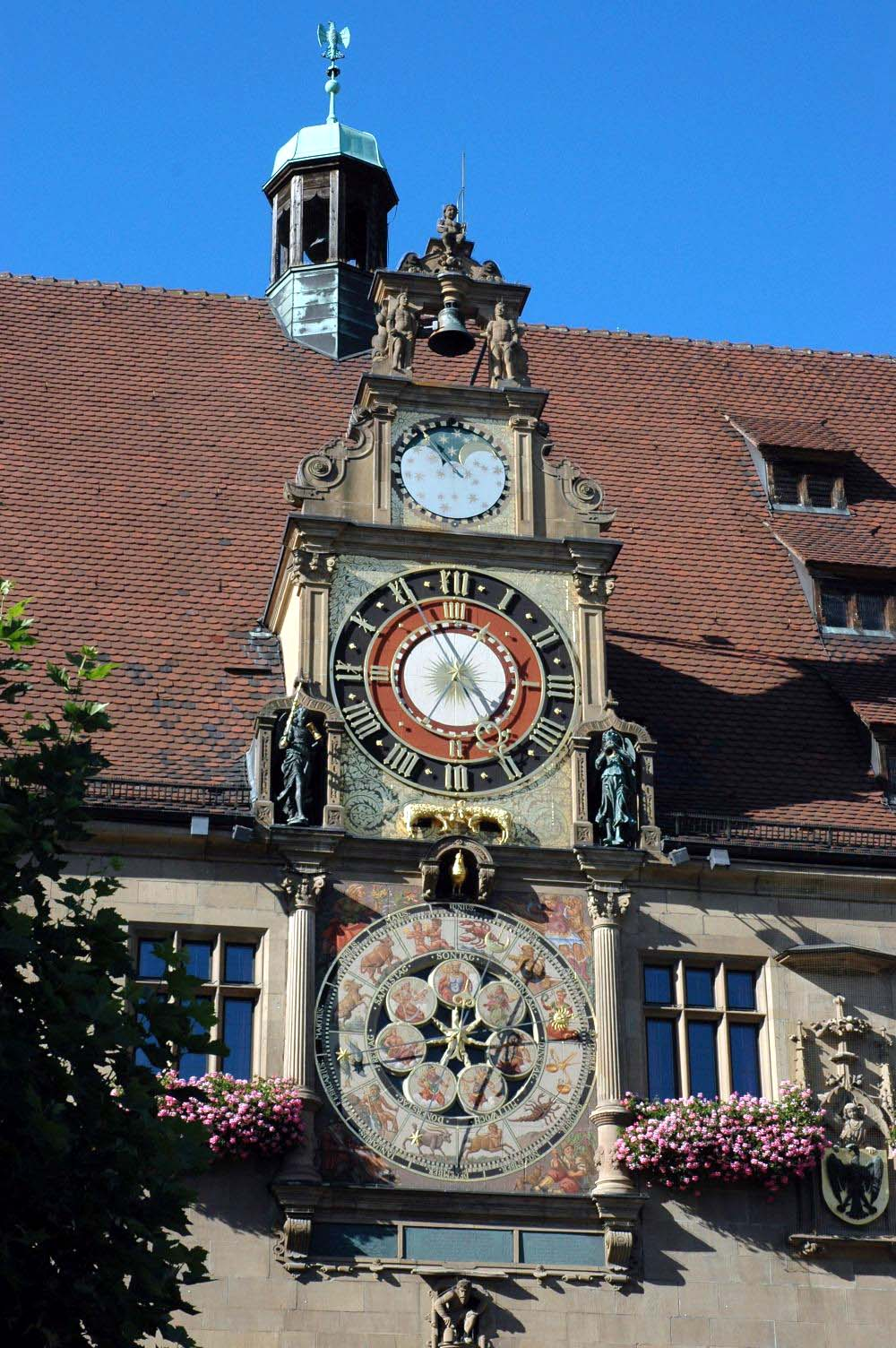
Astronomical clock at City Hall

Since the 1970s, after guest workers and immigrants from Islamic or Russian-Orthodox countries settled here, these faiths are practiced by a growing part of the population and numerous mosques have been created since the 1990s in the city and county of Heilbronn.

=== District reform ===
Over the years, the following, formerly independent towns or communities, have been annexed to Heilbronn:

Year	Town	Area (km^{2})
June 1, 1933	Böckingen	11.35
October 1, 1938	Neckargartach	11.25
October 1, 1938	Sontheim	7.40
January 1, 1970	Klingenberg	2.72
July 1, 1972	Kirchhausen	11.47
January 1, 1974	Biberach	10.58
April 1, 1974	Frankenbach	8.89
April 1, 1974	Horkheim	4.86

=== Demographics ===
Figures reflect city limits at the time and are estimates (until 1870) or Census data (¹), or official extensions thereof, counting only primary residences.

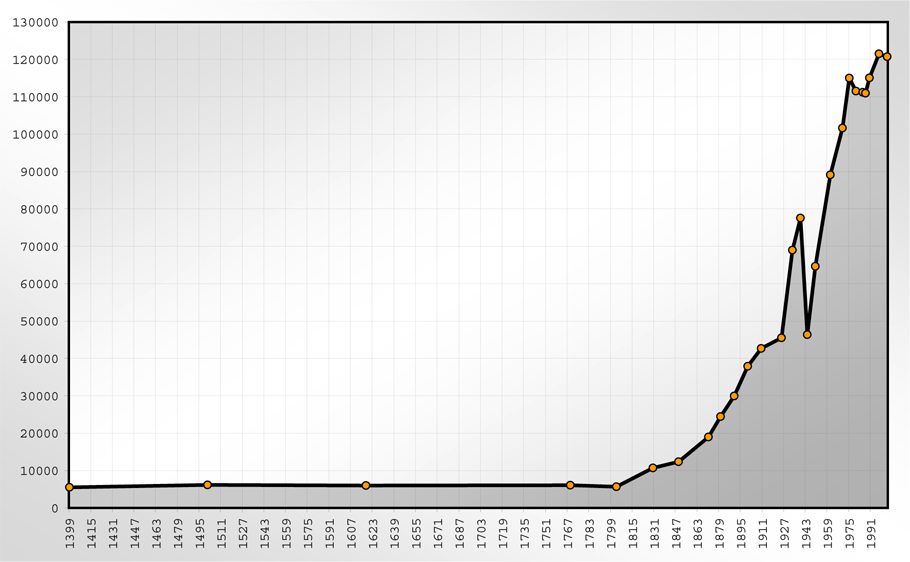
Population statistics of Heilbronn

Year	Population
1399	approx. 5,500
1501	6,168
1618	approx. 6,000
1769	6,077
1803	5,692
1830	10,703
1849	12,377
December 1, 1871	18,955
1880	24,446
December 1, 1890	29,941
December 1, 1900	37,891
December 1, 1910	42,688
June 16, 1925	45,520

Year	Population
June 16, 1933 ¹	68,953
May 17, 1939 ¹	77,569
1944 ¹	46,350
September 13, 1950 ¹	64,643
June 6, 1961 ¹	89,100
May 27, 1970 ¹	101,646
June 30, 1975	114,999
June 30, 1980	111,509
June 30, 1985	111,188
May 27, 1987 ¹	110,970
June 30, 1990 ¹	115,055
June 30, 1997	121,500
March 31, 2020	126,559
December 31, 2023	132,533

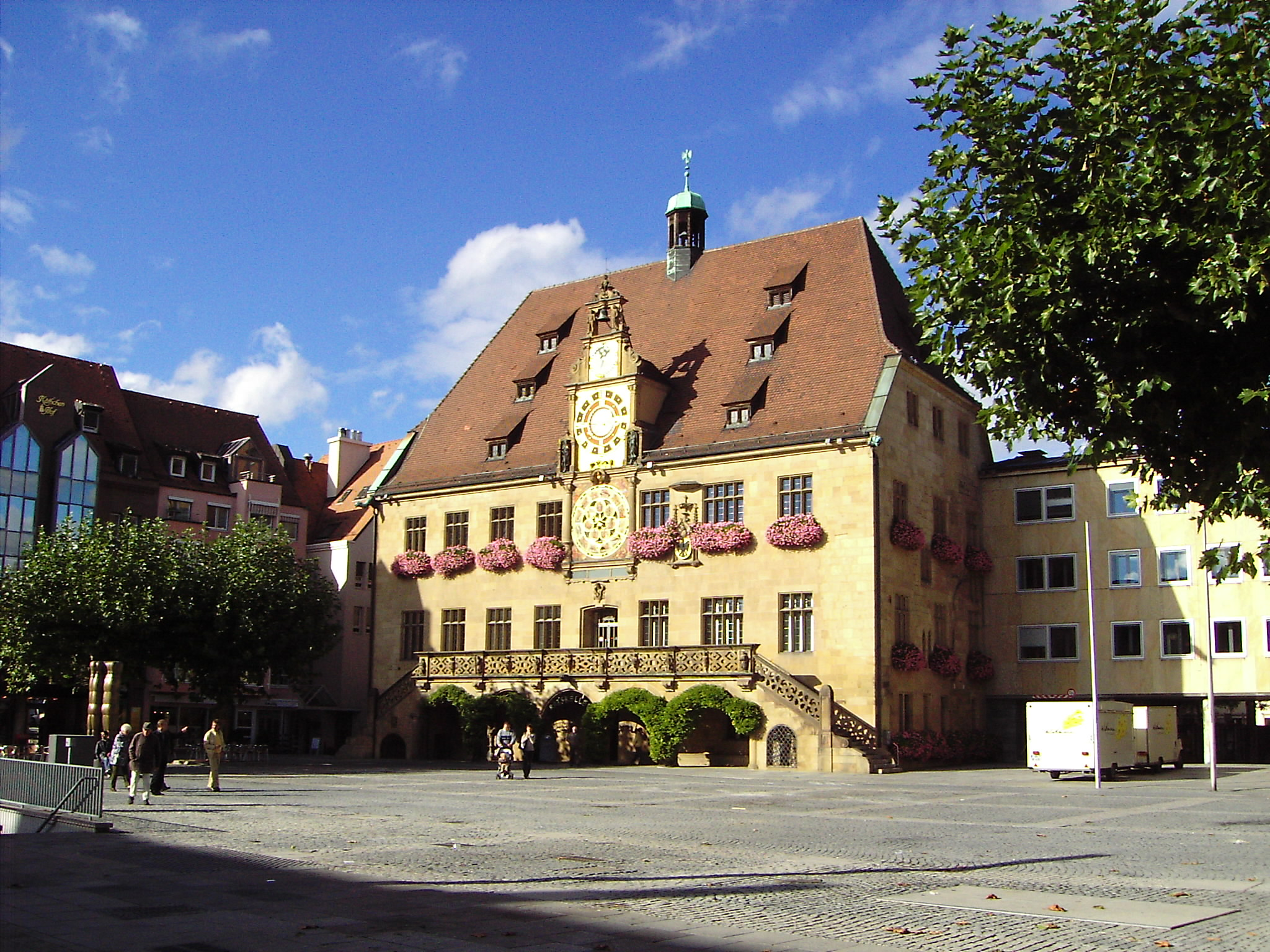
City Hall

¹ Census data

== Government ==
In connection with the district reform in the 1970s, municipal laws of Baden-Württemberg were amended to introduce borough councils for certain boroughs. Residents of such boroughs elect their borough council at each municipal election and the borough council must be consulted on all matters of significance to the respective borough. The Borough President also presides over the Borough Council. In Heilbronn the boroughs of Biberach, Böckingen, Frankenbach, Horkheim, Kirchhausen, Klingenberg, Neckargartach, and Sontheim have borough councils.

=== City council ===
After the municipal elections of May 26, 2019 the city council of Heilbronn was made up of 40 seats. Multiple members have since changed parties, resulting in the following distribution of seats:

Party	Seats
CDU	9
SPD	8
Bündnis 90/Green Party	8
FDP	4
FV	2
Pro Heilbronn	2
Unabhängige für Heilbronn (UfHN)	2
AfD	3
The Left	2

=== Mayor ===
At first Heilbronn was governed by a regal advocate and an executor. Later, the city had two mayors but ever since the city was made part of Württemberg it has had just one mayor at a time.

Year	Mayor
1803–1819	Georg Christian Franz Kübel
1819–1822	Lebrecht Landauer
1822–1835	Johann Clemens Bruckmann
1835–1848	Heinrich Titot
1848–1869	Christian August Klett

Year	Mayor
1869–1884	Karl Wüst
1884–1904	Paul Hegelmaier
1904–1921	Paul Göbel
1921–1933	Emil Beutinger
1933–1945	Heinrich Gültig
1945–1946	Emil Beutinger

Year	Mayor
1946–1948	Paul Metz
1948–1967	Paul Meyle
1967–1983	Hans Hoffmann
1983–1999	Manfred Weinmann
1999–2014	Helmut Himmelsbach
2014–present	Harry Mergel

=== Representatives from Heilbronn ===
The city of Heilbronn together with the northern municipalities of Heilbronn County makes up the electoral District 268 for national elections of representatives to the Bundestag.

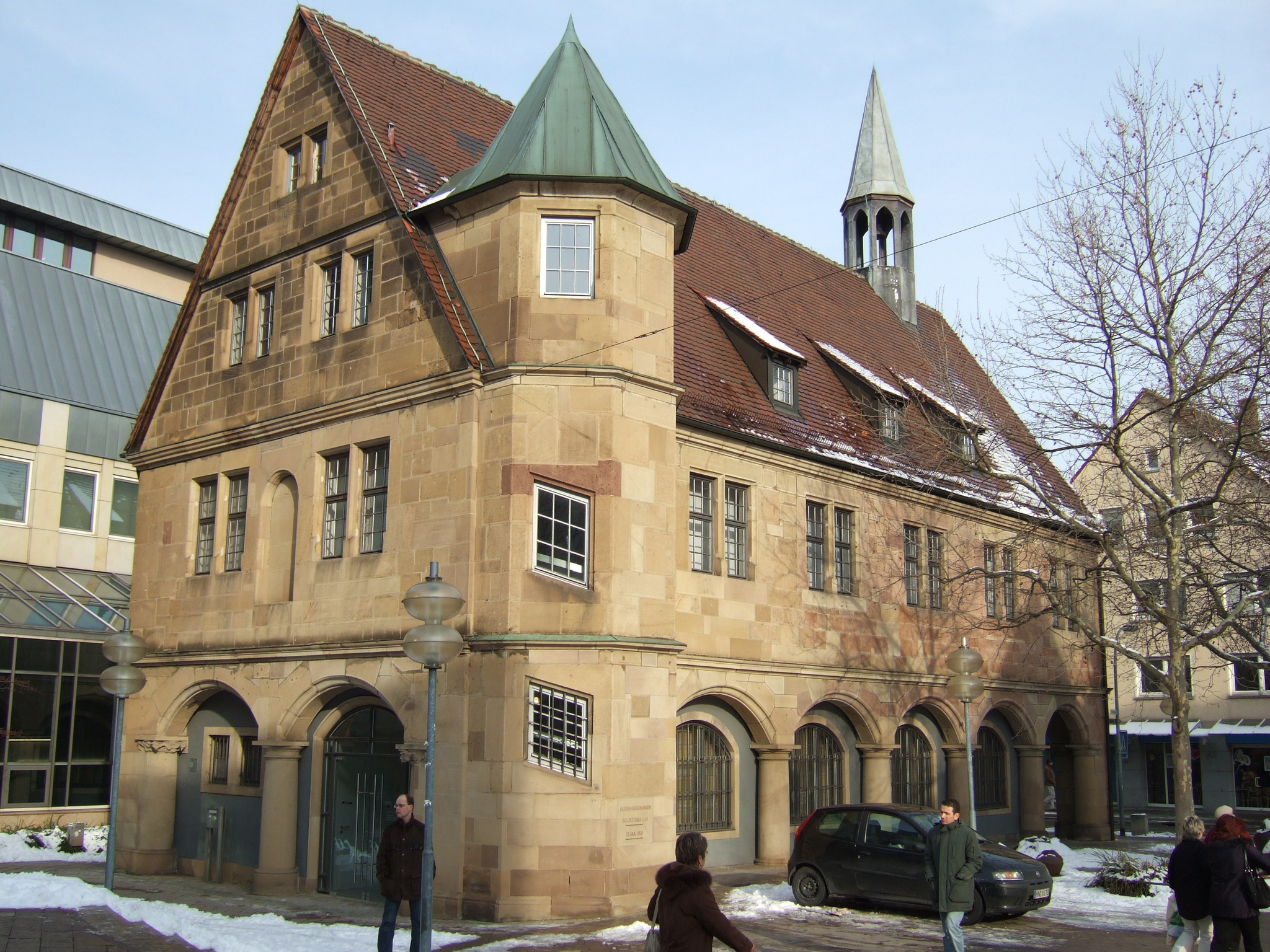
Museum of Natural History

For State elections to the Landtag of Baden-Württemberg Heilbronn makes up an electoral district (District 18) together with Erlenbach. Before the 2006 elections, it was an electoral district all by itself.

=== Coat of arms ===
Heilbronn's coat of arms features a black eagle with red tongue and claws on golden background. The eagle is protected by a red, silver and blue shield. The city flag is red, white and blue.

The oldest seal of the city dates back to 1265. The eagle is the symbol for the imperial freedom enjoyed by Heilbronn until it was annexed by the Grand Duchy (and later Kingdom) of Württemberg. While it is established that it appeared for the first time with shield in 1556 to distinguish it from other versions of eagles, the origin of the colors of the shield has yet to be determined. The colors also appeared in reverse order in 1556, 1581 and 1681 and there have been other variations of colour as well, such as white rather than golden background.

Interesting is the fact that Heilbronn sports three colours in its flag. Newly dedicated municipal flags in Baden-Württemberg only use two colours. According to State municipal laws, Heilbronn's flag was grandfathered as it had been in use prior to 1935.

== Main sights ==
=== Buildings ===
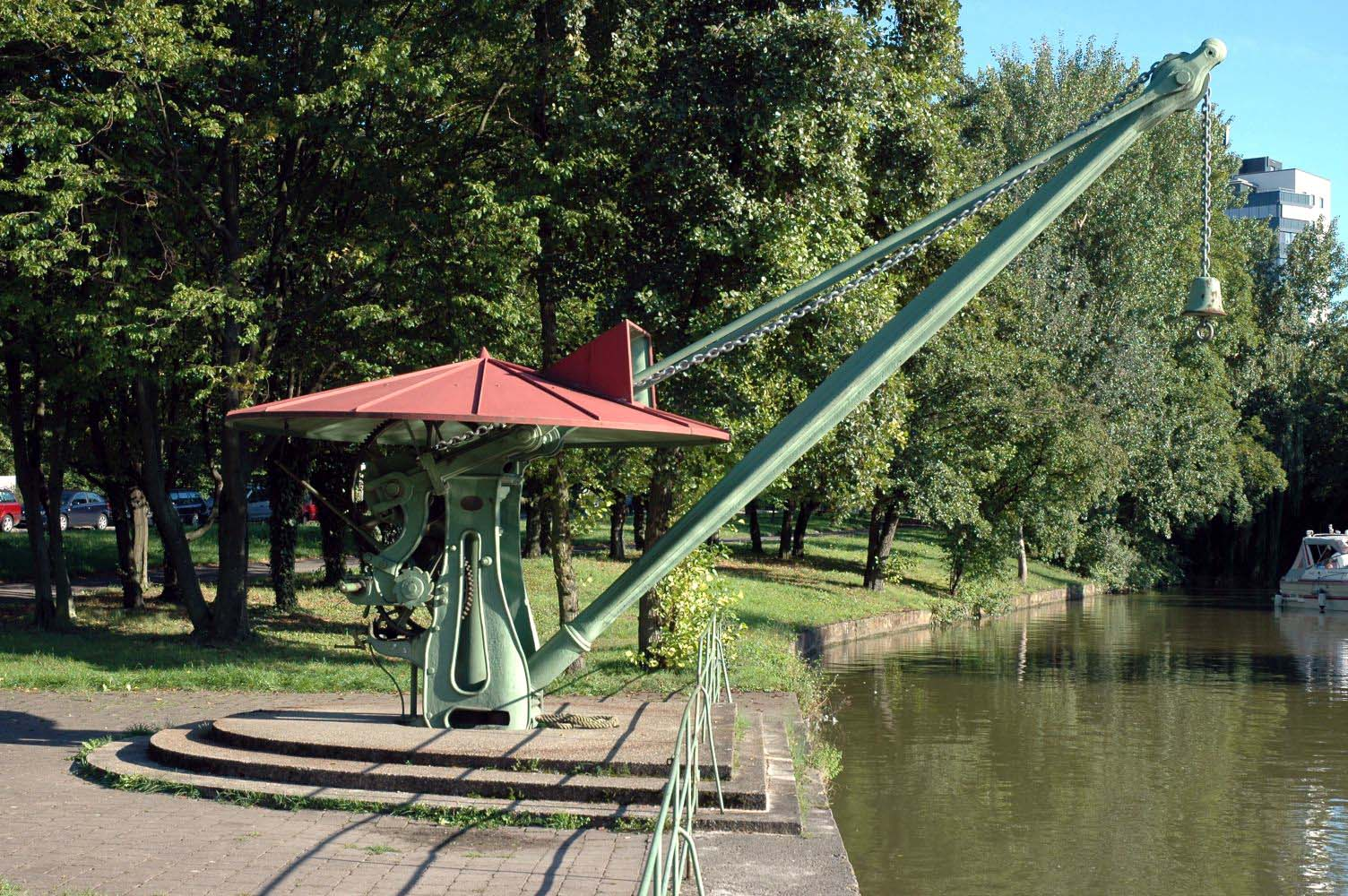
Historic manual crane

- Historic manual crane
- Bollwerksturm
- Deutschhof
- Steam power plant
- Community centre "Harmonie"
- Court and Fleischhaus
- Götzenturm
- Hafenmarktturm (port market tower)
- Haus Zehender at the market place
- Käthchenhaus at the market place
- City Hall with historic astronomic clock
- Schießhaus
- Trappenseeschlösschen
- Weinvilla

=== Churches ===
- Kilianskirche (Protestant): The tower from the early Renaissance is the logo of the city. The high altar by Hans Seyffer was completed in 1498.
- Deutschordensmünster St.-Peter-und-Paul (Catholic)
- Nikolaikirche (Protestant)

=== Museums ===
- Museum of Natural History
- City Galery Deutschhof
- Museum of archeology
- Kleist-Archiv Sembdner
- South-German Train Museum Heilbronn

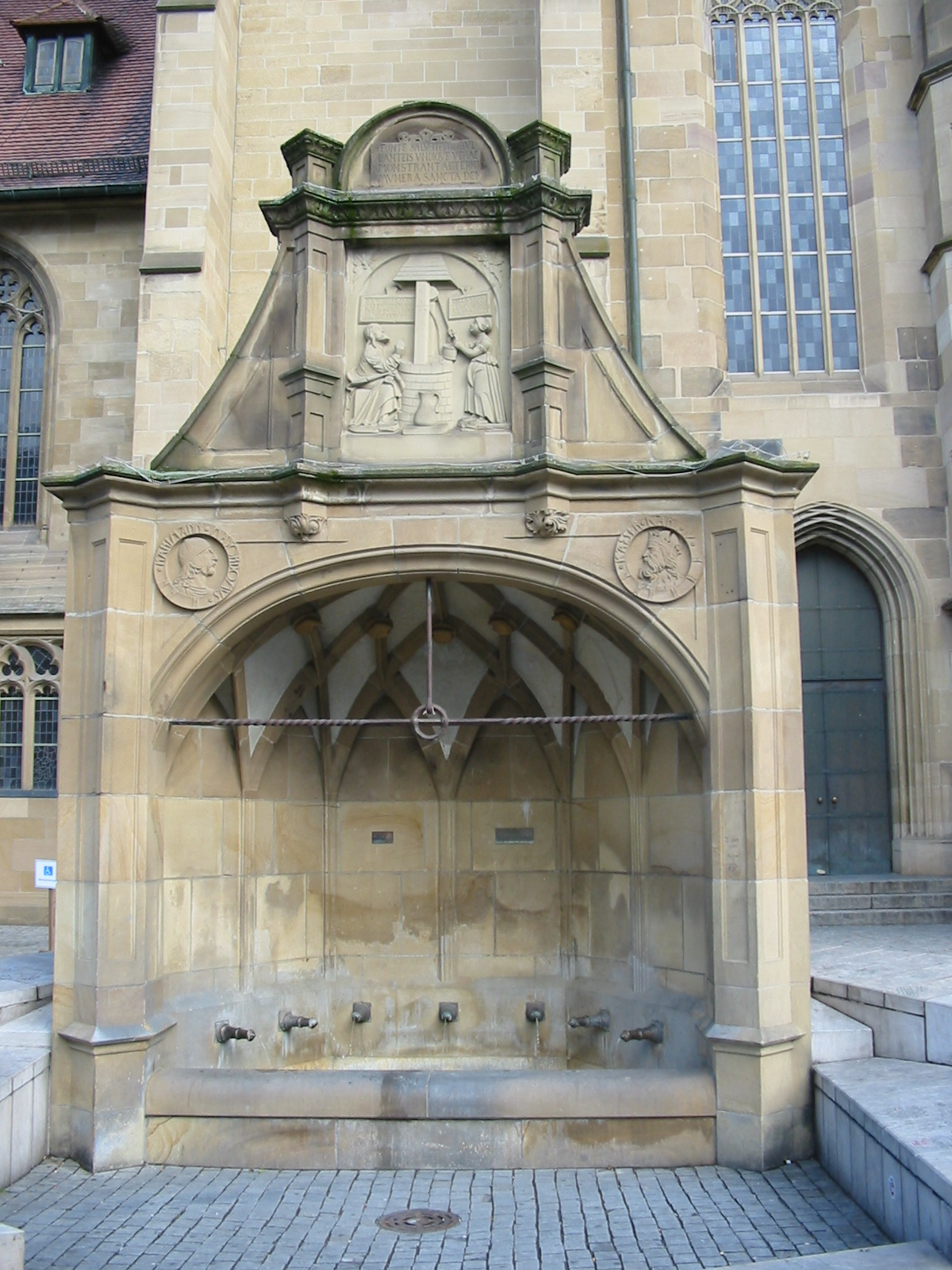
Siebenröhrenbrunnen

View of Heilbronn from Wartberg viewing tower

=== Other sights ===
- Old cemetery (created in 1530, a park since 1882)
- Viewing tower on the Wartberg hill provides a nice view of Heilbronn and the neighboring area.
- Ehrenfriedhof for the victims of the air raid on December 4, 1944
- Fleinertorbrunnen
- Robert Mayer Memorial in the market place
- Bismarck Memorial
- Siebenröhrenbrunnen
- Trappensee

== Culture ==
=== Language ===
Heilbronn is located near the border between the Swabian and the South Franconian dialects of the German language.

=== Theater ===
The Heilbronn municipal theatre on Berliner Platz was built between 1979 and 1982 and continues the tradition of the municipal theatre that was once located there. Together with the adjacent Logentheater of the Theaterforum K3, completed in 2001, the Salon 3 and the BOXX the Heilbronn Theatre offers drama, musical and opera performances.

The Theaterschiff Heilbronn, located on the Neckar river, also offers changing performances.

The young theatre label Tacheles and Tarantismus has created a place of encounter and dialogue with the theatre laboratory STILBRUCH. The programme includes in-house productions and own play developments, workshops with students, readings, performance pieces, concerts, open-stage formats and party series.

=== Museum ===
The Heilbronn's municipal museum in the Deutschhof shows its art and sculpture collections as well as exhibits on the history of the city, archaeology and the history of the earth. The municipal art collection focuses on works by regional artists, including 18th and 19th century painters such as Heinrich Friedrich Füger and Carl Doerr as well as 20th century artists such as Heinrich Altherr and Hal Busse. There is also a special collection of small sculptures and bozzetti by international sculptors such as Wilhelm Lehmbruck and Henry Moore. The archaeology collection is in the tradition of the earlier municipal collection of ground finds founded by Alfred Schliz (1849-1915) and largely destroyed during the Second World War. Friedrich von Alberti (1795-1878), who gave the name Triassic to the sequence of Buntsandstein, Muschelkalk and Keuper, was particularly responsible for research into the history of the earth in and around Heilbronn.

The Deutschhof is also home to Haus der Stadtgeschichte (House of City History), which hosts a permanent exhibition on the city's history by the Heilbronn City Archive. Admission to the permanent exhibitions of the municipal museums and the city archives is free, and the exhibition rooms are structurally connected. The municipal museums also run the Vogelmann Art Gallery together with the Heilbronn Art Association.

The Kunsthalle Vogelmann is a municipal exhibition hall in Heilbronn and focusses on modern art. The Kunsthalle was built in 2009/2010 as an extension of the municipal concert and congress center Harmonie.

The most important art associations in the city are the Kunstverein Heilbronn, which has existed with two new foundations since 1879 and has held more than 400 events since 1956, and the Künstlerbund, Heilbronn.

The Literaturhaus Heilbronn has opened in 2020. It is located in the Trappenseeschlösschen, a striking baroque building in the middle of a lake in the east of the city. With readings by contemporary authors, lectures, discussions, workshops and conferences as well as smaller temporary exhibitions, the Literaturhaus Heilbronn offers a variety of formats on the subject of literature and reading. Associated to the Literaturhaus is the Kleist Archiv Semdner, an archive and study center on the famous German author Heinrich von Kleist.

In 2009, experimenta, the largest science centre in southern Germany, opened in the Hagenbucher, a former storage building. The exhibition was expanded by 2019 with a new building, designed by Sauerbruch Hutton, an architecture practice based in Berlin, Germany.

=== Music ===
The Württemberg Chamber Orchestra Heilbronn (WKO), founded in 1960 by Jörg Faerber, is one of the best known German chamber orchestras.

Since 2015 the Classic Open Air Festival takes place in the city centre. With free admission and in the open air, orchestras and music groups from Heilbronn present themselves with a varied concert program.

The Heilbronn municipal music school is housed in the K3 theatre forum.

The jazz club Cave 61, founded in 1961, is a nationally known organizer of jazz concerts with jazz groups from all over the world. Its venue is an old theatre.

=== Other cultural venues ===
The city of Heilbronn supports various cultural projects, including the art and cultural workhouse Zigarre and Kommunales Kino in the Kulturkeller in the Gewerkschaftshaus as well as the free cultural center Maschinenfabrik, which started in 2021 in an old factory.

=== Events ===
In February the citizens of Heilbronn and the surrounding area have an opportunity to enjoy themselves at the Pferdemarkt. In May the Trollinger marathon takes place. The Heilbronner Volksfest on the Theresienwiese is the largest festival of its kind in Heilbronn. Each year it begins on the last Friday in July and ends on the second Monday in August. In September, people enjoy themselves at the Heilbronner Weindorf, in October at the Hafenmarkt and in November and December at the Weihnachtsmarkt, a Christmas market.

== Sport ==
FC Heilbronn is a football club based in Heilbronn, Baden-Württemberg formed only recently – in 2003 – out of a merger between two former clubs with the elder dating back to 1896 and playing a five-year stint in the Regionalliga Süd (II) / 2nd Bundesliga Süd from 1969 to 1975.

Heilbronn hosts an annual tennis tournament Heilbronn Open (see Heilbronn Open website) which is part of the ATP Challenger tour.

Heilbronn is also the hometown of ice hockey team Heilbronner Falken (Heilbronn Falcons). The team currently plays in the second German ice hockey league. The Eisbären Heilbronn (Heilbronn polar bears) is the second ice hockey team, which is playing in the regional league South-West in Baden-Württemberg.

The „Red Devils“ Heilbronn is a wrestling team, which is part of the national wrestling league.

The city's 68 sport clubs offer a wide range of different sporting activities and have around 30,000 members.

== Economy and infrastructure ==
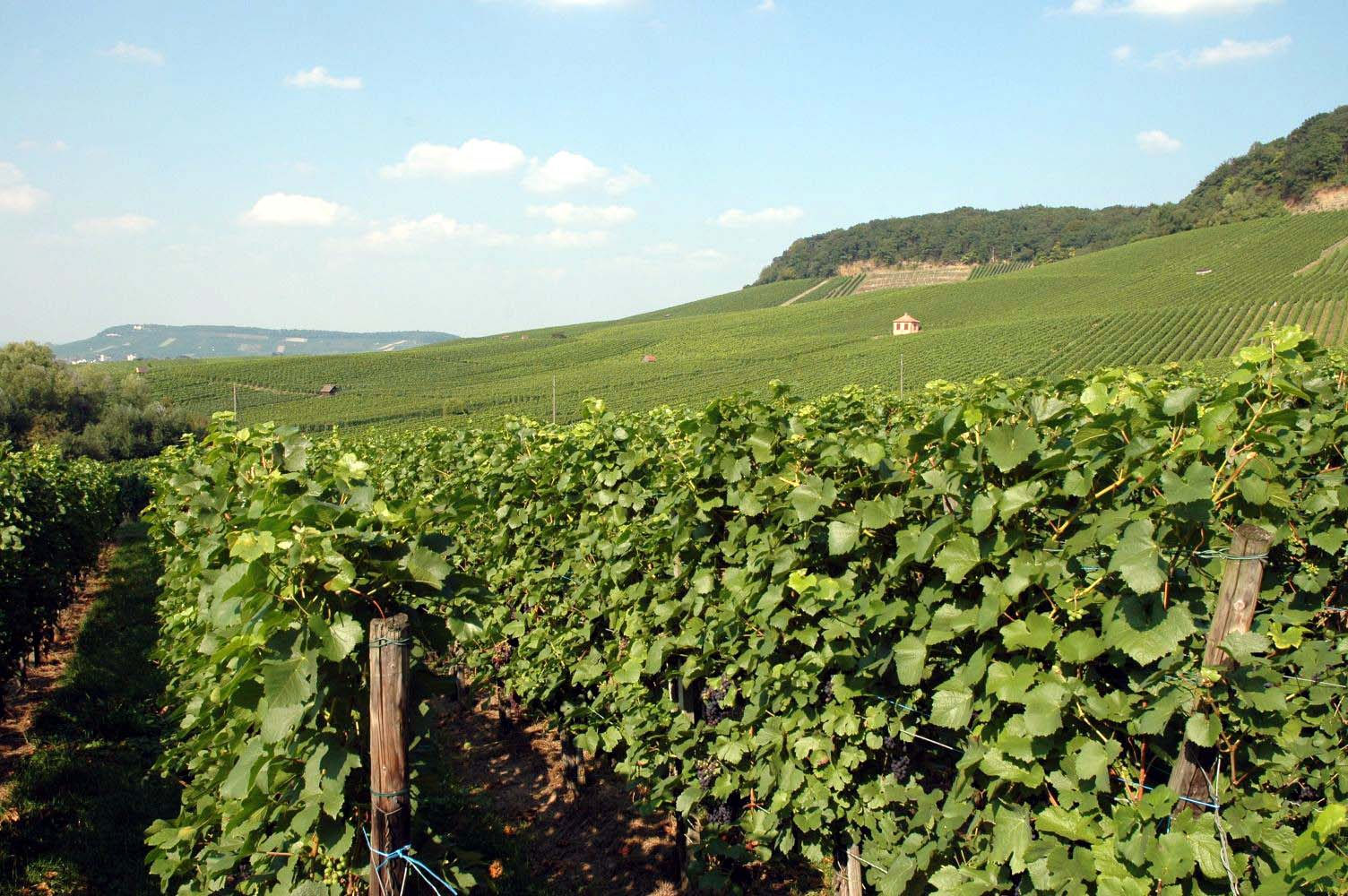
Vineyards east of Heilbronn

Viticulture has a long tradition in Heilbronn and is an important part of its economy to this day. Its 514 ha, two thirds of it growing red grapes, is the third largest vineyard in Württemberg's vine-growing region after Brackenheim and Lauffen am Neckar. In 1888, the vintners of the Heilbronn area combined and formed the Weingärtnergesellschaft Heilbronn, a cooperative. In 1933, that cooperative then merged with the competing cooperative Winzergenossenschaft Heilbronn that had formed in 1919 and that cooperative again merged with the Vintner cooperatives of Erlenbach and Weinsberg to form the Genossenschaftskellerei Heilbronn-Erlenbach-Weinsberg with seat just outside the city limits in Erlenbach. In addition to the cooperative, numerous independent vintners are also located here.

South of the steam power plant is located the conveyor tower of the Südwestdeutsche Salzwerke AG (SWS). The SWS runs a salt mine in the Heilbronn area. That mine was connected through a tunnel with the now shut-down (since 1994) salt mine Kochendorf in Bad Friedrichshall. Extraction had extended the Heilbronn mine far to the west so that in 2004 a new shaft, Konradsberg, was added — probably the last mining shaft that was constructed in all of Germany.

=== Infrastructure ===
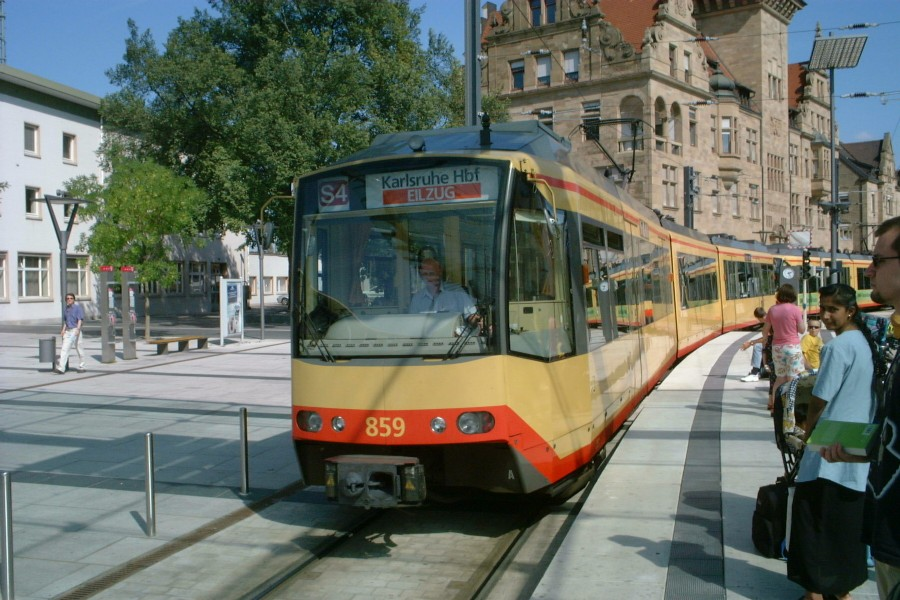
Heilbronn/Karlsruhe Stadtbahn train pulling into the station outside of Heilbronn Hauptbahnhof

The city of Heilbronn is readily accessible by road courtesy of the Weinsberg Intersection just to the northeast of the city, the intersection of the Autobahn A 81 from Würzburg to Gottmadingen and the A 6 from Saarbrücken to Waidhaus. In addition to the Autobahns the city is connected via the Bundesstraßen B 27 from Blankenburg to Schaffhausen, B 39 from Frankenstein (Palatine) to Mainhardt and B 293 from Karlsruhe to Heilbronn that both run through the city itself.

Heilbronn is also a forerunner of right turn on red in Germany and 65 "Green arrow" signs have been installed at appropriate intersections since 1996.

Although Heilbronn Hauptbahnhof (central station) does not benefit from the Deutsche Bahn long-distance service, the city is well connected by train. The Franconia Railway (Frankenbahn) connects Stuttgart and Würzburg, the Neckar Valley Railway and Elsenz Valley Railway run from Heilbronn to Heidelberg and Mannheim, and the Hohenlohe Railway accommodates travel to Schwäbisch Hall via Öhringen.

The Heilbronn and Karlsruhe Stadtbahns provide a connection all the way to Karlsruhe on the Kraichgau Railway's tracks. Currently the S 4 takes travellers from Karlsruhe through the central train station past the centre of town all the way to the Öhringen borough of Cappel (since December 11, 2005). Because of massive delays in the construction of the S-Bahn tracks through Heilbronn's city limits and with the modernization

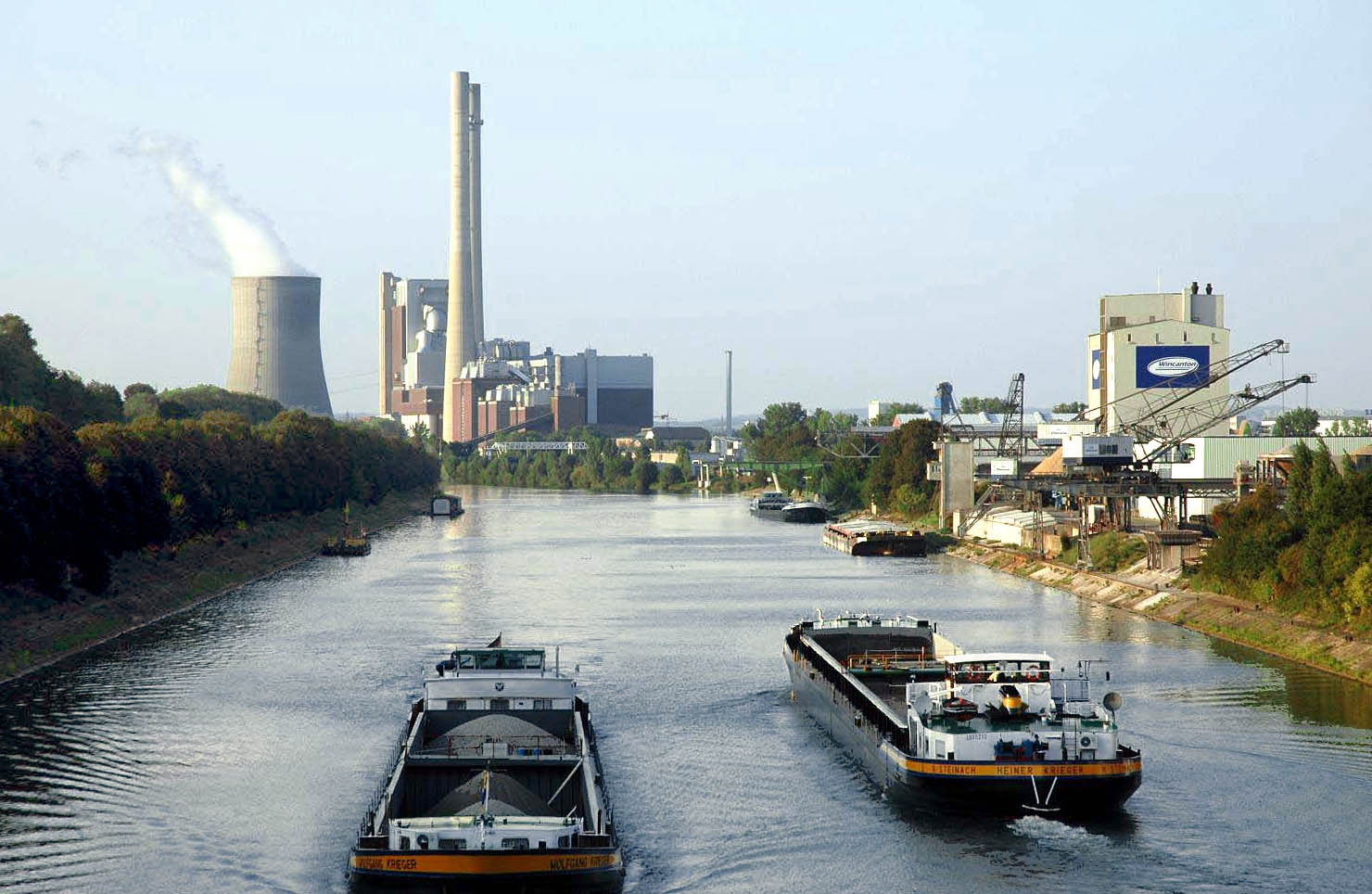
The Heilbronn canal port

and electrification of the existing tracks from Heilbronn to Öhringen meant that the new section's official opening needed to be postponed several times. In the future, additional S-Bahn lines are planned to Neckarsulm, Lauffen am Neckar and Zaberfeld. As well a these new lines, additional stops will also be built in the inner city of Heilbronn. In 2014 the S-Bahn line to Neckarsulm was established.

Whilst the original Straßenbahn of Heilbronn, nicknamed the Spatzenschaukel (German for "sparrows' swing"), was discontinued on April 1, 1955, the city used electrically powered trolley buses until 1960. Today, public transportation is provided by the S-Bahn that runs through Heilbronn similar to the Karlsruhe model and this is complemented by buses run by the Stadtwerke Heilbronn (Verkehrsbetriebe) and several other enterprises. All now belong to the Heilbronner Verkehrsverbund.

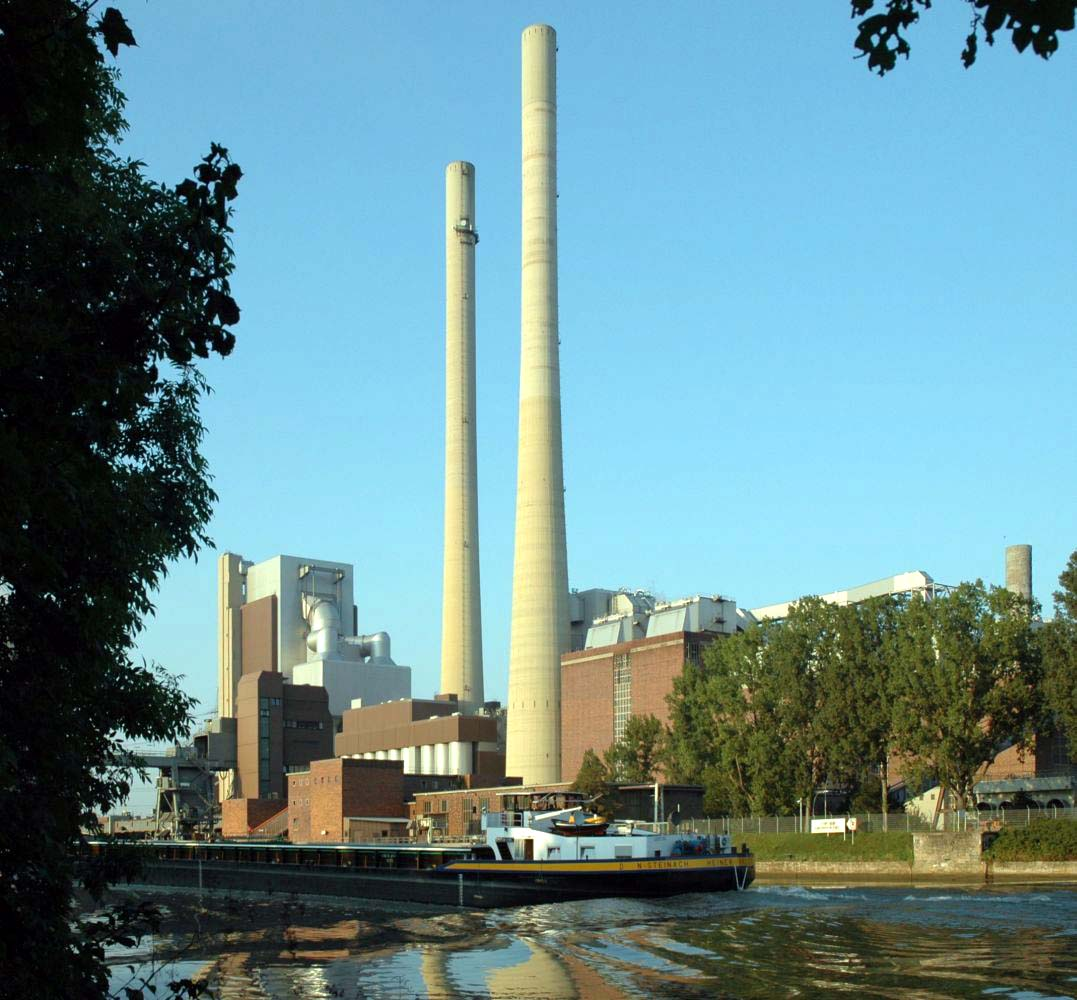
Thermal power plant

View of the Thermal Power Plant from Wartberg

The canal port on the Neckar is one of the ten largest German interior ports.

=== Power plant ===
In the industrial part of Heilbronn EnBW AG runs a large powerplant that is powered by coal. Its two chimneys (250 m tall) and cooling tower (140 m tall) are visible from afar, see Heilbronn Power Station.

=== Transport ===
The public light rail system with the lines S4, S41 and S42 (Heilbronn Stadtbahn) is run by the Albtal-Verkehrs-Gesellschaft. The local bus system is run by the Stadtwerke Heilbronn (municipal utilities of Heilbronn). There are also various regional bus lines to the Zabergäu area, the Schozach/Bottwartal area, the Kraichgau area and the Kochertal area. These are run by OVR (a part of the Transdev group) and Regiobus Stuttgart (a part of DB Regio). The city does not have its own airport. The nearest airports are Stuttgart Airport located 71 km (44 mi) to the south and Frankfurt Airport located 143 km (89 mi) to the north west of Heibronn.

=== Media ===
Heilbronn is home to one of the studios of Südwestrundfunk (SWR). From here regional programmes like Frankenradio are broadcast on SWR4 Baden-Württemberg. The Heilbronner Stimme is a daily newspaper published in the city and the advertisers Neckar Express, echo am Mittwoch and echo am Sonntag are available weekly free of charge. Heilbronners also peruse the monthly city magazines Freizeit Journal and Moritz.

=== Public service ===
Several courts are located in Heilbronn, two belonging to the Stuttgart court district, a specialty court hearing labour issues, and a family court whose district includes the city of Heilbronn and the counties of Heilbronn, Ludwigsburg, Schwäbisch Hall, Hohenlohe and Main-Tauber.

The city is also the seat of the Prelature of Heilbronn and of the church district of Heilbronn (of the Protestant State Church as well as of the Heilbronn Deacony of the Diocese of Rottenburg-Stuttgart).

=== Education ===
Heilbronn offers a wide range of higher education institutions developing very dynamically. In 2020, 9054 people were studying in Heilbronn, almost 60 percent more than ten years ago. On 1 February 2020 the Ministry of the Interior of Baden-Württemberg awarded the city of Heilbronn the designation of University City.

Heilbronn is the seat of the main campus of the Hochschule Heilbronn, founded in 1961 as a public engineering school. Since 1971 the school was known as the Fachhochschule Heilbronn (Heilbronn University) and has operated a secondary campus in Künzelsau since 1988. Starting with the fall semester on September 1, 2005, the Fachhochschule was awarded the status of a Hochschule. In 2009 a third campus in Schwäbisch Hall was established.

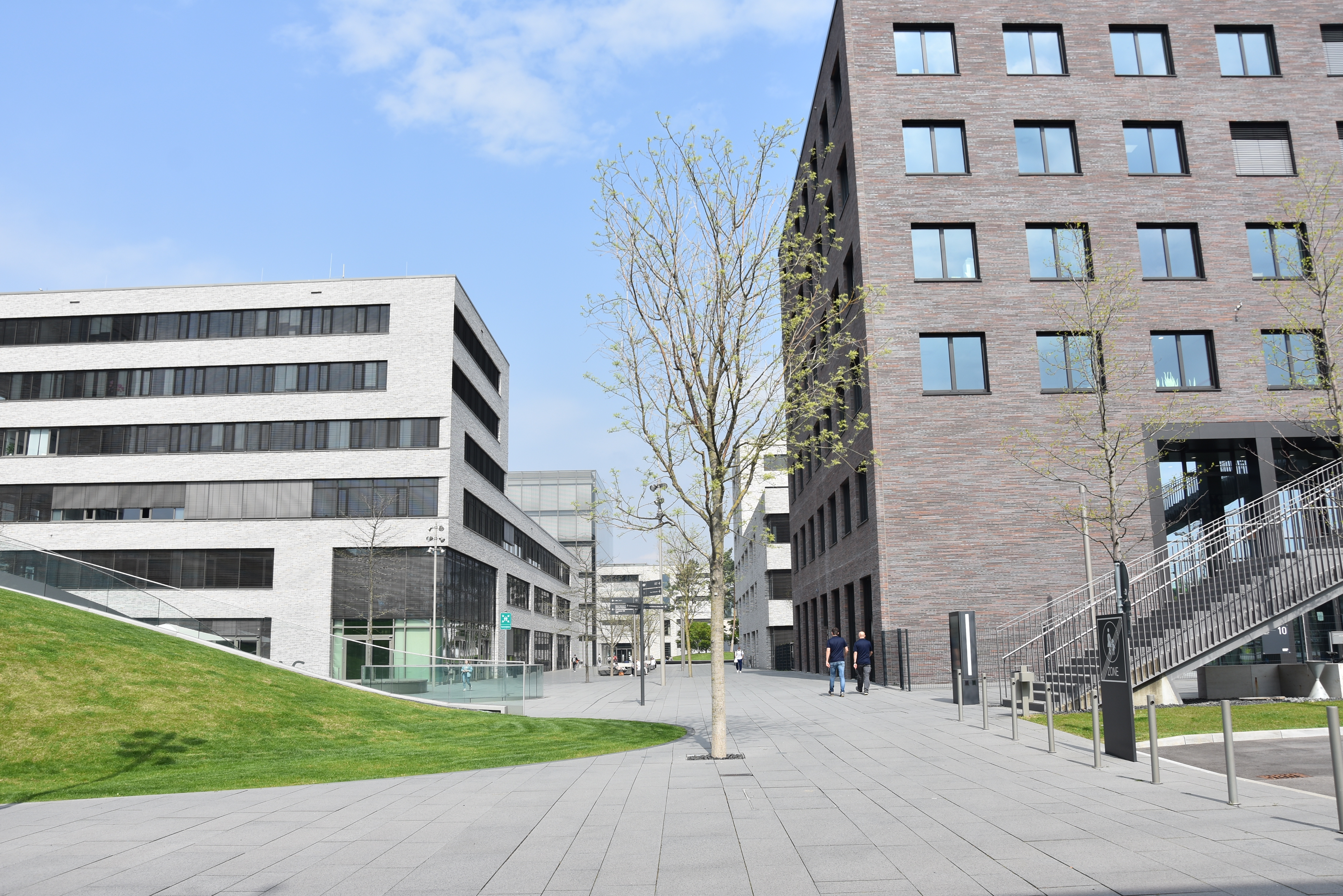
View of the Bildungscampus Heilbronn

Today the business faculties of the Hochschule Heilbronn reside at the Bildungscampus of the Dieter Schwarz Foundation in the heart of Heilbronn along with the Baden-Wuerttemberg Cooperative State University Heilbronn (DHBW Heilbronn), the Baden-Wuerttemberg Cooperative State University - Center for Advanced Studies (DHBW CAS) as well as the Campus Heilbronn of the Technical University of Munich and other educational establishments and scientific institutions.

42 Heilbronn, a full-time tuition-free coding school, was established in 2021 nearby the Bildungscampus.

As far as general education is concerned, Heilbronn operates five college-track highschools or gymnasiums (Elly-Heuss-Knapp-Gymnasium, Justinus-Kerner-Gymnasium, Mönchsee-Gymnasium, Robert-Mayer-Gymnasium and Theodor-Heuss-Gymnasium), four non-college-track highschools or Realschulen (Dammrealschule, Helene-Lange-Realschule, Heinrich-von-Kleist-Realschule in Böckingen and Mörike-Realschule). There are also six special-education schools run by the city Wilhelm-Hofmann-Förderschule, Pestalozzi-Förderschule, and Paul-Meyle-Schule for the mentally and physically impaired, two special-education schools run by Heilbronn County (Gebrüder-Grimm-Schule for the speech impaired and Hermann-Herzog-Schule for the seeing impaired), and the Lindenparkschule, which is run by the state of Baden-Württemberg for the hearing and speech impaired. The latter also includes a boarding school and consultation centre.

City primary schools are the Damm-Grundschule, Deutschorden-Grundschule Kirchhausen, Grundschule Horkheim, Grundschule Klingenberg, Grünewaldschule Grundschule Böckingen, Reinöhlschule Grundschule Böckingen, Silcherschule Grundschule and Uhlandschule Grundschule Sontheim. Grammar and middle schools (some include vocational training programs) are Albrecht-Dürer-Schule Neckargartach, Elly-Heuss-Knapp-Schule Böckingen, Fritz-Ulrich-Schule Böckingen, Gerhart-Hauptmann-Schule, Grund- und Hauptschule mit Werkrealschule Biberach, Grund- und Hauptschule mit Werkrealschule Frankenbach, Ludwig-Pfau-Schule, Rosenauschule, Staufenbergschule Sontheim, Wartbergschule and Wilhelm-Hauff-Schule.

The Gustav-von-Schmoller-Schule and the Technische Schulzentrum Heilbronn consisting of the Johann-Jakob-Widmann-Schule and the Wilhelm-Maybach-Schule are professional training schools run by the city. The county runs the Andreas-Schneider-Schule and Christiane-Herzog-Schule, and in the fall of 2005 the Peter-Bruckmann-Schule was added to the already operating professional training schools.

Finally, the following private schools round out the education options offered in Heilbronn:

- The Abendrealschule Heilbronn e.V. allows students with middle school diplomas to achieve the first in a series of steps to gain college entrance prerequisites on a part-time basis after work. It is part of a structured program commonly referred to as the Alternate Path to Higher Education.
- Academy for Communication sciences
- Alice-Salomon-Schule
- Altenpflegeschule Heilbronn
- Berufskolleg für Grafik Heilbronn
- Freie Waldorfschule Heilbronn
- Internationaler Bund e. V. Bildungszentrum Heilbronn
- Katholisches Freies Bildungszentrum St. Kilian Heilbronn with grammar, middle, and college-track as well as non-college-track highschools
- Kolping-Bildungszentrum Heilbronn

=== Crime ===
A female police officer, Michèle Kiesewetter, was in 2007 fatally shot in Heilbronn, an event that gave its name to the so-called Phantom of Heilbronn – an elusive serial killer hunted by German police for several years. The "Phantom" was in March 2009 revealed not be a serial killer, but the result of procedural errors by the German police. In 2011 the police discovered that Kiesewetter was murdered by National Socialist Underground terrorists.

== Twin towns – sister cities ==
Heilbronn is twinned with:

- Béziers, France (1965)
- Solothurn, Switzerland (1981)
- Stockport, England (1982)
- Frankfurt (Oder), Germany (1988)
- Słubice, Poland (1998)
- Novorossiysk, Russia (2019)

== Gallery ==
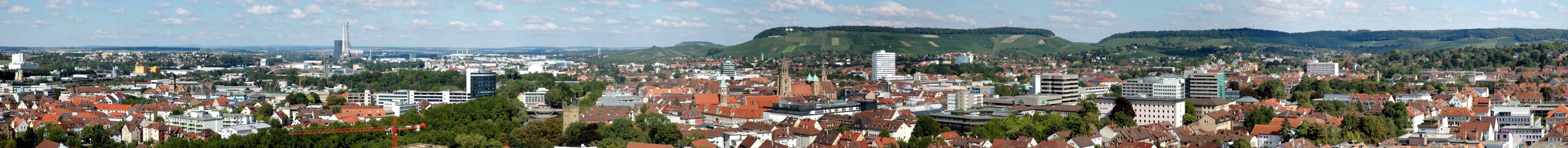
150° panorama of Heilbronn's city centre

== Footnotes ==
=== Sources ===
- Schrenk, Christhard; Hubert Weckbach; Susanne Schlösser (1998). Von Helibrunna nach Heilbronn: eine Stadtgeschichte (in German). Stuttgart: Theiss. ISBN 3-8062-1333-X. (Publications from the archives of the city of Heilbronn; 36)
- Chronik der Stadt Heilbronn (in German). Heilbronn: Stadtarchiv Heilbronn. 1895–2004. Published so far are Vols. I–VII (741 to 1957) and X (1970 to 1974)
- Keyser, Erich (ed.) (1962). Württembergisches Städtebuch. In: Deutsches Städtebuch. Handbuch städtischer Geschichte. Vol. 4,2. Stuttgart: Kohlhammer Verlag.
- Fekete, Julius (2002). Kunst- und Kulturdenkmale im Stadt- und Landkreis Heilbronn (in German). Stuttgart: Konrad Theiss Verlag. ISBN 3-8062-1662-2.
- Jacobi, Uwe (1992). Die vermissten Ratsprotokolle (in German). Heilbronn: Heilbronner Stimme. ISBN 3-921923-09-3.
- Jacobi, Uwe (2004). Heilbronn 4. Dezember 1944. Protokoll einer Katastrophe (in German). Heilbronn: Heilbronner Stimme. ISBN 3-921923-12-3.
