= Raum Weinsberg =

- Gemeindeverwaltungsverband
- Location of Raum Weinsberg within Heilbronn district
- Interactive map of Raum Weinsberg
- Location within Germany Location within Baden-Württemberg
- Coordinates: 49°09′N 9°17′E
- Country: Germany
- State: Baden-Württemberg
- Admin. region: Stuttgart
- District: Heilbronn
- Seat: Weinsberg
- Subdivisions: 4 municipalities

Area
  - Total: 46.8 km^{2} (18.1 sq mi)

Population (2025-12-31)
  - Total: 23,271
  - Density: 497/km^{2} (1,290/sq mi)
- Time zone: UTC+01:00 (CET)
  - Summer (DST): UTC+02:00 (CEST)
- Website: www.weinsberg.de

Raum Weinsberg is a Gemeindeverwaltungsverband in the district of Heilbronn in Baden-Württemberg, Germany. The seat of the Gemeindeverwaltungsverband is in Weinsberg.

The Gemeindeverwaltungsverband Raum Weinsberg consists of the following municipalities:

1. Eberstadt
2. Ellhofen
3. Lehrensteinsfeld
4. Weinsberg
