= List of minor planets: 425001–426000 =

The following is a partial list of minor planets, running from minor-planet number 425001 through 426000, inclusive. The primary data for this and other partial lists is based on JPL's "Small-Body Orbital Elements" and data available from the Minor Planet Center. Critical list information is also provided by the MPC, unless otherwise specified from Lowell Observatory. A detailed description of the table's columns and additional sources are given on the main page including a complete list of every page in this series, and a statistical break-up on the dynamical classification of minor planets.

Also see the summary list of all named bodies in numerical and alphabetical order, and the corresponding naming citations for the number range of this particular list. New namings may only be added to this list after official publication, as the preannouncement of names is condemned by the Working Group for Small Bodies Nomenclature of the International Astronomical Union.

Near-Earth obj.	MBA (inner)	MBA (outer)	Centaur
Mars-crosser	MBA (middle)	Jupiter trojan	Trans-Neptunian obj.
Unclassified

== 425001–425100 ==
Designation			Discovery			Properties		Ref
Permanent	Provisional	Named after	Date	Site	Discoverer(s)	Category	Diam.	Ref
425001	2009 CN_{64}	—	February 3, 2009	Kitt Peak	Spacewatch	·	2.6 km	MPC · JPL
425002	2009 DL_{4}	—	February 20, 2009	Catalina	CSS	·	1.5 km	MPC · JPL
425003	2009 DK_{6}	—	February 17, 2009	Kitt Peak	Spacewatch	·	2.8 km	MPC · JPL
425004	2009 DN_{39}	—	February 18, 2009	Wildberg	R. Apitzsch	·	4.7 km	MPC · JPL
425005	2009 DU_{46}	—	February 28, 2009	Socorro	LINEAR	·	3.6 km	MPC · JPL
425006	2009 DF_{64}	—	February 22, 2009	Kitt Peak	Spacewatch	·	750 m	MPC · JPL
425007	2009 DQ_{66}	—	February 24, 2009	Mount Lemmon	Mount Lemmon Survey	·	710 m	MPC · JPL
425008	2009 DE_{76}	—	February 21, 2009	Mount Lemmon	Mount Lemmon Survey	·	540 m	MPC · JPL
425009	2009 DZ_{88}	—	February 22, 2009	Siding Spring	SSS	T_{j} (2.99)	4.4 km	MPC · JPL
425010	2009 DU_{106}	—	February 28, 2009	Kitt Peak	Spacewatch	·	2.8 km	MPC · JPL
425011	2009 DC_{112}	—	February 26, 2009	Calar Alto	F. Hormuth	CYB	3.3 km	MPC · JPL
425012	2009 DN_{124}	—	February 19, 2009	Kitt Peak	Spacewatch	THM	2.5 km	MPC · JPL
425013	2009 DV_{124}	—	February 19, 2009	Kitt Peak	Spacewatch	·	920 m	MPC · JPL
425014	2009 DW_{125}	—	February 19, 2009	Kitt Peak	Spacewatch	·	4.2 km	MPC · JPL
425015	2009 DJ_{126}	—	February 19, 2009	Kitt Peak	Spacewatch	PHO	1.2 km	MPC · JPL
425016	2009 EL_{6}	—	March 1, 2009	Mount Lemmon	Mount Lemmon Survey	·	3.3 km	MPC · JPL
425017	2009 EW_{16}	—	March 15, 2009	Kitt Peak	Spacewatch	·	3.5 km	MPC · JPL
425018	2009 EE_{19}	—	March 15, 2009	Mount Lemmon	Mount Lemmon Survey	(1298)	2.7 km	MPC · JPL
425019	2009 EK_{29}	—	March 2, 2009	Mount Lemmon	Mount Lemmon Survey	THB	3.3 km	MPC · JPL
425020	2009 ES_{30}	—	March 3, 2009	Mount Lemmon	Mount Lemmon Survey	·	690 m	MPC · JPL
425021	2009 FH_{3}	—	February 20, 2009	Kitt Peak	Spacewatch	·	580 m	MPC · JPL
425022	2009 FN_{7}	—	March 16, 2009	Kitt Peak	Spacewatch	·	770 m	MPC · JPL
425023	2009 FL_{22}	—	March 19, 2009	Calar Alto	F. Hormuth	·	730 m	MPC · JPL
425024	2009 FK_{66}	—	March 21, 2009	Kitt Peak	Spacewatch	·	610 m	MPC · JPL
425025	2009 FR_{67}	—	March 19, 2009	Kitt Peak	Spacewatch	·	1.2 km	MPC · JPL
425026	2009 FB_{70}	—	March 18, 2009	Mount Lemmon	Mount Lemmon Survey	·	1.1 km	MPC · JPL
425027	2009 FN_{71}	—	March 28, 2009	Mount Lemmon	Mount Lemmon Survey	·	4.7 km	MPC · JPL
425028	2009 FZ_{72}	—	March 19, 2009	Mount Lemmon	Mount Lemmon Survey	·	680 m	MPC · JPL
425029	2009 FL_{74}	—	March 16, 2009	Mount Lemmon	Mount Lemmon Survey	·	640 m	MPC · JPL
425030	2009 FC_{77}	—	March 18, 2009	Kitt Peak	Spacewatch	·	580 m	MPC · JPL
425031	2009 HF_{18}	—	April 18, 2009	Mount Lemmon	Mount Lemmon Survey	·	540 m	MPC · JPL
425032	2009 HQ_{24}	—	April 17, 2009	Kitt Peak	Spacewatch	·	4.2 km	MPC · JPL
425033	2009 HL_{29}	—	April 19, 2009	Kitt Peak	Spacewatch	·	610 m	MPC · JPL
425034	2009 HJ_{78}	—	April 24, 2009	Mount Lemmon	Mount Lemmon Survey	·	890 m	MPC · JPL
425035	2009 HK_{98}	—	April 2, 2009	Kitt Peak	Spacewatch	·	580 m	MPC · JPL
425036	2009 HF_{103}	—	April 18, 2009	Kitt Peak	Spacewatch	·	690 m	MPC · JPL
425037	2009 HT_{104}	—	April 18, 2009	Kitt Peak	Spacewatch	MAS	710 m	MPC · JPL
425038	2009 KN_{16}	—	May 26, 2009	Kitt Peak	Spacewatch	V	760 m	MPC · JPL
425039	2009 KX_{37}	—	February 7, 2006	Mount Lemmon	Mount Lemmon Survey	L5	8.7 km	MPC · JPL
425040	2009 MS_{2}	—	June 17, 2009	Kitt Peak	Spacewatch	·	1.0 km	MPC · JPL
425041	2009 OF_{9}	—	July 28, 2009	La Sagra	OAM	·	1.8 km	MPC · JPL
425042	2009 PR	—	August 13, 2009	Dauban	Kugel, F.	MAS	880 m	MPC · JPL
425043	2009 PE_{3}	—	August 12, 2009	La Sagra	OAM	·	1.4 km	MPC · JPL
425044	2009 PV_{7}	—	August 15, 2009	Catalina	CSS	JUN	1.1 km	MPC · JPL
425045	2009 PQ_{12}	—	August 15, 2009	Catalina	CSS	·	1.2 km	MPC · JPL
425046	2009 QY_{2}	—	August 16, 2009	Kitt Peak	Spacewatch	RAF	650 m	MPC · JPL
425047	2009 QE_{8}	—	August 20, 2009	Kitt Peak	Spacewatch	AMO +1km	800 m	MPC · JPL
425048	2009 QW_{10}	—	August 22, 2009	Dauban	Kugel, F.	MAS	630 m	MPC · JPL
425049	2009 QS_{21}	—	August 19, 2009	La Sagra	OAM	·	1 km	MPC · JPL
425050	2009 QR_{23}	—	August 16, 2009	Kitt Peak	Spacewatch	·	1.2 km	MPC · JPL
425051	2009 QR_{29}	—	August 23, 2009	Bergisch Gladbach	W. Bickel	·	1.7 km	MPC · JPL
425052	2009 QP_{32}	—	August 23, 2009	Wildberg	R. Apitzsch	·	1.4 km	MPC · JPL
425053	2009 QM_{33}	—	August 24, 2009	La Sagra	OAM	·	1.3 km	MPC · JPL
425054	2009 QQ_{34}	—	June 21, 2009	Mount Lemmon	Mount Lemmon Survey	JUN	1.2 km	MPC · JPL
425055	2009 QA_{40}	—	August 27, 2009	Kitt Peak	Spacewatch	·	1.1 km	MPC · JPL
425056	2009 QM_{50}	—	March 26, 2007	Mount Lemmon	Mount Lemmon Survey	·	1.6 km	MPC · JPL
425057	2009 QK_{54}	—	August 26, 2009	Catalina	CSS	·	1.7 km	MPC · JPL
425058	2009 QB_{59}	—	August 27, 2009	Kitt Peak	Spacewatch	·	1.2 km	MPC · JPL
425059	2009 QC_{62}	—	August 28, 2009	Socorro	LINEAR	·	1.6 km	MPC · JPL
425060	2009 RN_{3}	—	August 16, 2009	Catalina	CSS	·	1.9 km	MPC · JPL
425061	2009 RF_{8}	—	September 12, 2009	Kitt Peak	Spacewatch	·	1.1 km	MPC · JPL
425062	2009 RZ_{8}	—	September 12, 2009	Kitt Peak	Spacewatch	·	1.1 km	MPC · JPL
425063	2009 RQ_{10}	—	September 12, 2009	Kitt Peak	Spacewatch	MRX	920 m	MPC · JPL
425064	2009 RD_{15}	—	November 1, 2005	Mount Lemmon	Mount Lemmon Survey	·	1.4 km	MPC · JPL
425065	2009 RV_{15}	—	September 12, 2009	Kitt Peak	Spacewatch	·	1.2 km	MPC · JPL
425066	2009 RB_{19}	—	September 13, 2009	Purple Mountain	PMO NEO Survey Program	·	1.1 km	MPC · JPL
425067	2009 RP_{20}	—	September 14, 2009	Kitt Peak	Spacewatch	·	1.2 km	MPC · JPL
425068	2009 RN_{37}	—	September 15, 2009	Kitt Peak	Spacewatch	·	950 m	MPC · JPL
425069	2009 RJ_{41}	—	September 15, 2009	Kitt Peak	Spacewatch	·	1.3 km	MPC · JPL
425070	2009 RL_{43}	—	September 15, 2009	Kitt Peak	Spacewatch	·	1.5 km	MPC · JPL
425071	2009 RB_{46}	—	September 15, 2009	Kitt Peak	Spacewatch	·	1.5 km	MPC · JPL
425072	2009 RQ_{55}	—	September 15, 2009	Kitt Peak	Spacewatch	·	1.7 km	MPC · JPL
425073	2009 RV_{59}	—	September 10, 2009	Catalina	CSS	·	1.6 km	MPC · JPL
425074	2009 RF_{61}	—	September 15, 2009	Catalina	CSS	·	1.5 km	MPC · JPL
425075	2009 RN_{65}	—	September 15, 2009	Kitt Peak	Spacewatch	·	2.1 km	MPC · JPL
425076	2009 RC_{69}	—	September 15, 2009	Kitt Peak	Spacewatch	·	1.2 km	MPC · JPL
425077	2009 RG_{69}	—	September 15, 2009	Mount Lemmon	Mount Lemmon Survey	·	860 m	MPC · JPL
425078	2009 RE_{70}	—	September 15, 2009	Kitt Peak	Spacewatch	·	1.3 km	MPC · JPL
425079	2009 RX_{70}	—	September 15, 2009	Kitt Peak	Spacewatch	·	1.2 km	MPC · JPL
425080	2009 RB_{71}	—	September 15, 2009	Kitt Peak	Spacewatch	·	1.3 km	MPC · JPL
425081	2009 RO_{72}	—	September 15, 2009	Kitt Peak	Spacewatch	·	1.9 km	MPC · JPL
425082	2009 RH_{74}	—	September 15, 2009	Kitt Peak	Spacewatch	·	1.0 km	MPC · JPL
425083	2009 RJ_{75}	—	September 15, 2009	Kitt Peak	Spacewatch	·	1.4 km	MPC · JPL
425084	2009 SB_{2}	—	August 18, 2009	Catalina	CSS	·	1.6 km	MPC · JPL
425085	2009 SS_{15}	—	September 19, 2009	Bisei SG Center	BATTeRS	·	1.6 km	MPC · JPL
425086	2009 SG_{19}	—	September 22, 2009	Altschwendt	W. Ries	JUN	950 m	MPC · JPL
425087	2009 SJ_{23}	—	September 16, 2009	Kitt Peak	Spacewatch	·	1.7 km	MPC · JPL
425088	2009 SP_{25}	—	September 16, 2009	Kitt Peak	Spacewatch	·	1.3 km	MPC · JPL
425089	2009 SL_{31}	—	September 16, 2009	Kitt Peak	Spacewatch	·	1.4 km	MPC · JPL
425090	2009 SX_{36}	—	September 16, 2009	Kitt Peak	Spacewatch	·	1.1 km	MPC · JPL
425091	2009 SW_{37}	—	September 16, 2009	Kitt Peak	Spacewatch	·	1.2 km	MPC · JPL
425092	2009 SE_{44}	—	September 16, 2009	Kitt Peak	Spacewatch	·	1.2 km	MPC · JPL
425093	2009 SW_{58}	—	September 17, 2009	Kitt Peak	Spacewatch	·	1.3 km	MPC · JPL
425094	2009 SU_{59}	—	September 17, 2009	Kitt Peak	Spacewatch	·	1.8 km	MPC · JPL
425095	2009 SD_{66}	—	September 17, 2009	Kitt Peak	Spacewatch	·	1.5 km	MPC · JPL
425096	2009 SZ_{68}	—	September 17, 2009	Kitt Peak	Spacewatch	AGN	1.0 km	MPC · JPL
425097	2009 SN_{76}	—	September 17, 2009	Kitt Peak	Spacewatch	·	1.4 km	MPC · JPL
425098	2009 SY_{89}	—	September 18, 2009	Mount Lemmon	Mount Lemmon Survey	DOR	2.1 km	MPC · JPL
425099	2009 SF_{98}	—	March 2, 2008	Kitt Peak	Spacewatch	NYS	1.3 km	MPC · JPL
425100	2009 SP_{102}	—	September 22, 2009	Socorro	LINEAR	·	1.9 km	MPC · JPL

== 425101–425200 ==
back to top

Designation			Discovery			Properties		Ref
Permanent	Provisional	Named after	Date	Site	Discoverer(s)	Category	Diam.	Ref
425101	2009 SN_{108}	—	September 16, 2009	Mount Lemmon	Mount Lemmon Survey	·	2.0 km	MPC · JPL
425102	2009 SN_{111}	—	September 18, 2009	Kitt Peak	Spacewatch	·	1.7 km	MPC · JPL
425103	2009 SS_{113}	—	November 10, 2005	Kitt Peak	Spacewatch	·	2.1 km	MPC · JPL
425104	2009 ST_{115}	—	November 1, 2005	Mount Lemmon	Mount Lemmon Survey	·	1.7 km	MPC · JPL
425105	2009 SF_{117}	—	September 18, 2009	Kitt Peak	Spacewatch	(5)	1.1 km	MPC · JPL
425106	2009 SA_{119}	—	September 18, 2009	Kitt Peak	Spacewatch	·	1.2 km	MPC · JPL
425107	2009 SF_{119}	—	September 18, 2009	Kitt Peak	Spacewatch	(5)	950 m	MPC · JPL
425108	2009 SM_{121}	—	September 18, 2009	Kitt Peak	Spacewatch	·	1.2 km	MPC · JPL
425109	2009 ST_{133}	—	September 18, 2009	Kitt Peak	Spacewatch	·	1.1 km	MPC · JPL
425110	2009 SW_{141}	—	September 19, 2009	Kitt Peak	Spacewatch	ADE	2.1 km	MPC · JPL
425111	2009 SB_{144}	—	September 19, 2009	Kitt Peak	Spacewatch	(5)	1.2 km	MPC · JPL
425112	2009 SY_{146}	—	September 19, 2009	Kitt Peak	Spacewatch	·	2.7 km	MPC · JPL
425113	2009 SM_{151}	—	September 20, 2009	Kitt Peak	Spacewatch	·	2.0 km	MPC · JPL
425114	2009 SZ_{159}	—	September 20, 2009	Kitt Peak	Spacewatch	·	1.5 km	MPC · JPL
425115	2009 SQ_{160}	—	September 20, 2009	Kitt Peak	Spacewatch	·	960 m	MPC · JPL
425116	2009 SO_{170}	—	September 23, 2009	Mount Lemmon	Mount Lemmon Survey	·	1.7 km	MPC · JPL
425117	2009 SK_{172}	—	May 3, 2008	Mount Lemmon	Mount Lemmon Survey	·	1.7 km	MPC · JPL
425118	2009 SM_{175}	—	September 4, 2000	Anderson Mesa	LONEOS	·	2.1 km	MPC · JPL
425119	2009 SE_{183}	—	September 21, 2009	Kitt Peak	Spacewatch	·	1.3 km	MPC · JPL
425120	2009 SG_{186}	—	September 21, 2009	Kitt Peak	Spacewatch	MAR	880 m	MPC · JPL
425121	2009 SX_{187}	—	September 21, 2009	Kitt Peak	Spacewatch	·	2.7 km	MPC · JPL
425122	2009 SD_{189}	—	September 22, 2009	La Sagra	OAM	·	2.0 km	MPC · JPL
425123	2009 SA_{195}	—	September 18, 2009	Kitt Peak	Spacewatch	·	1.3 km	MPC · JPL
425124	2009 SF_{199}	—	September 22, 2009	Kitt Peak	Spacewatch	·	1.7 km	MPC · JPL
425125	2009 SV_{209}	—	September 23, 2009	Kitt Peak	Spacewatch	KOR	1.1 km	MPC · JPL
425126	2009 SZ_{209}	—	March 17, 2004	Kitt Peak	Spacewatch	·	1.3 km	MPC · JPL
425127	2009 SY_{212}	—	September 23, 2009	Kitt Peak	Spacewatch	EUN	1.4 km	MPC · JPL
425128	2009 SJ_{216}	—	September 24, 2009	Kitt Peak	Spacewatch	·	1.1 km	MPC · JPL
425129	2009 SK_{216}	—	September 24, 2009	Kitt Peak	Spacewatch	·	1.7 km	MPC · JPL
425130	2009 SY_{218}	—	August 17, 2009	Catalina	CSS	·	1.6 km	MPC · JPL
425131	2009 SO_{224}	—	December 25, 2005	Kitt Peak	Spacewatch	KOR	1.2 km	MPC · JPL
425132	2009 SK_{229}	—	September 18, 2009	Catalina	CSS	·	2.3 km	MPC · JPL
425133	2009 SY_{234}	—	September 17, 2009	Mount Lemmon	Mount Lemmon Survey	·	2.2 km	MPC · JPL
425134	2009 SC_{238}	—	September 16, 2009	Catalina	CSS	·	1.7 km	MPC · JPL
425135	2009 SP_{239}	—	September 17, 2009	Catalina	CSS	·	1.5 km	MPC · JPL
425136	2009 SU_{239}	—	September 17, 2009	Catalina	CSS	·	1.9 km	MPC · JPL
425137	2009 SJ_{249}	—	September 18, 2009	Kitt Peak	Spacewatch	·	1.4 km	MPC · JPL
425138	2009 SG_{250}	—	September 19, 2009	Kitt Peak	Spacewatch	·	2.1 km	MPC · JPL
425139	2009 SO_{257}	—	September 21, 2009	Catalina	CSS	·	1.7 km	MPC · JPL
425140	2009 SZ_{262}	—	September 23, 2009	Mount Lemmon	Mount Lemmon Survey	·	2.0 km	MPC · JPL
425141	2009 SK_{266}	—	September 23, 2009	Mount Lemmon	Mount Lemmon Survey	·	1.0 km	MPC · JPL
425142	2009 SR_{266}	—	September 23, 2009	Mount Lemmon	Mount Lemmon Survey	MAR	1.1 km	MPC · JPL
425143	2009 SO_{279}	—	September 25, 2009	Kitt Peak	Spacewatch	·	1.6 km	MPC · JPL
425144	2009 SF_{282}	—	September 25, 2009	Kitt Peak	Spacewatch	·	1.1 km	MPC · JPL
425145	2009 SC_{285}	—	September 25, 2009	Mount Lemmon	Mount Lemmon Survey	·	1.3 km	MPC · JPL
425146	2009 SS_{286}	—	September 17, 2009	Kitt Peak	Spacewatch	·	1.2 km	MPC · JPL
425147	2009 SU_{295}	—	September 27, 2009	Mount Lemmon	Mount Lemmon Survey	·	1.5 km	MPC · JPL
425148	2009 SE_{297}	—	September 28, 2009	Catalina	CSS	·	1.3 km	MPC · JPL
425149	2009 SC_{327}	—	September 22, 2009	Mount Lemmon	Mount Lemmon Survey	·	1.7 km	MPC · JPL
425150	2009 SO_{327}	—	September 26, 2009	Kitt Peak	Spacewatch	·	1.3 km	MPC · JPL
425151	2009 SS_{328}	—	September 30, 2009	Mount Lemmon	Mount Lemmon Survey	ADE	1.8 km	MPC · JPL
425152	2009 SS_{334}	—	September 25, 2009	Kitt Peak	Spacewatch	·	2.6 km	MPC · JPL
425153	2009 SR_{337}	—	September 28, 2009	Catalina	CSS	·	1.9 km	MPC · JPL
425154	2009 SX_{339}	—	September 26, 2009	Kitt Peak	Spacewatch	·	3.6 km	MPC · JPL
425155	2009 SS_{347}	—	September 29, 2009	Kitt Peak	Spacewatch	·	1.1 km	MPC · JPL
425156	2009 SA_{352}	—	September 17, 2009	Catalina	CSS	·	1.6 km	MPC · JPL
425157	2009 SP_{354}	—	September 23, 2009	Mount Lemmon	Mount Lemmon Survey	·	1.8 km	MPC · JPL
425158	2009 SC_{357}	—	September 20, 2009	Mount Lemmon	Mount Lemmon Survey	·	1.9 km	MPC · JPL
425159	2009 SQ_{358}	—	September 18, 2009	Catalina	CSS	EUN	1.2 km	MPC · JPL
425160	2009 SU_{358}	—	September 18, 2009	Kitt Peak	Spacewatch	·	1.3 km	MPC · JPL
425161	2009 SA_{360}	—	September 26, 2009	Catalina	CSS	·	2.0 km	MPC · JPL
425162	2009 SE_{360}	—	September 27, 2009	Catalina	CSS	·	1.0 km	MPC · JPL
425163	2009 SL_{363}	—	September 18, 2009	Kitt Peak	Spacewatch	·	1.4 km	MPC · JPL
425164	2009 TU_{7}	—	July 27, 2009	Catalina	CSS	·	1.4 km	MPC · JPL
425165	2009 TK_{9}	—	October 14, 2009	La Sagra	OAM	·	1.8 km	MPC · JPL
425166	2009 TD_{13}	—	October 15, 2009	Vail-Jarnac	Jarnac	·	2.7 km	MPC · JPL
425167	2009 TO_{13}	—	September 27, 2009	Mount Lemmon	Mount Lemmon Survey	·	2.8 km	MPC · JPL
425168	2009 TD_{18}	—	September 12, 2009	Kitt Peak	Spacewatch	·	1.1 km	MPC · JPL
425169	2009 TV_{18}	—	September 29, 2005	Kitt Peak	Spacewatch	·	1.1 km	MPC · JPL
425170	2009 TB_{33}	—	October 15, 2009	Mount Lemmon	Mount Lemmon Survey	V	870 m	MPC · JPL
425171	2009 TR_{47}	—	October 2, 2009	Mount Lemmon	Mount Lemmon Survey	·	1.1 km	MPC · JPL
425172	2009 UQ_{3}	—	October 19, 2009	Mayhill	Lowe, A.	·	2.6 km	MPC · JPL
425173	2009 UQ_{10}	—	September 18, 2009	Kitt Peak	Spacewatch	AGN	1.0 km	MPC · JPL
425174	2009 UN_{19}	—	October 24, 2009	Magdalena Ridge	Ryan, W. H.	·	2.8 km	MPC · JPL
425175	2009 UD_{20}	—	October 23, 2009	BlackBird	Levin, K.	·	1.5 km	MPC · JPL
425176	2009 UQ_{21}	—	October 16, 2009	Mount Lemmon	Mount Lemmon Survey	·	990 m	MPC · JPL
425177	2009 UA_{32}	—	October 18, 2009	Mount Lemmon	Mount Lemmon Survey	NEM	2.2 km	MPC · JPL
425178	2009 US_{32}	—	October 18, 2009	Mount Lemmon	Mount Lemmon Survey	·	1.2 km	MPC · JPL
425179	2009 UE_{35}	—	October 21, 2009	Mount Lemmon	Mount Lemmon Survey	·	2.0 km	MPC · JPL
425180	2009 UL_{35}	—	October 21, 2009	Mount Lemmon	Mount Lemmon Survey	·	1.2 km	MPC · JPL
425181	2009 UJ_{38}	—	October 22, 2009	Mount Lemmon	Mount Lemmon Survey	·	2.5 km	MPC · JPL
425182	2009 UN_{38}	—	October 22, 2009	Mount Lemmon	Mount Lemmon Survey	·	4.1 km	MPC · JPL
425183	2009 UY_{43}	—	September 20, 2009	Mount Lemmon	Mount Lemmon Survey	·	1.4 km	MPC · JPL
425184	2009 UJ_{62}	—	September 15, 2009	Kitt Peak	Spacewatch	·	1.3 km	MPC · JPL
425185	2009 UH_{69}	—	October 1, 2009	Mount Lemmon	Mount Lemmon Survey	EUN	1.3 km	MPC · JPL
425186	2009 UK_{70}	—	November 26, 2005	Kitt Peak	Spacewatch	·	1.1 km	MPC · JPL
425187	2009 UB_{74}	—	October 21, 2009	Mount Lemmon	Mount Lemmon Survey	JUN	860 m	MPC · JPL
425188	2009 UE_{79}	—	October 21, 2009	Mount Lemmon	Mount Lemmon Survey	·	1.5 km	MPC · JPL
425189	2009 UR_{96}	—	November 9, 1999	Socorro	LINEAR	·	1.7 km	MPC · JPL
425190	2009 UW_{96}	—	September 16, 2009	Mount Lemmon	Mount Lemmon Survey	·	1.4 km	MPC · JPL
425191	2009 UT_{107}	—	December 6, 2005	Kitt Peak	Spacewatch	·	1.7 km	MPC · JPL
425192	2009 UJ_{111}	—	September 21, 2009	Mount Lemmon	Mount Lemmon Survey	·	1.4 km	MPC · JPL
425193	2009 US_{111}	—	October 24, 2009	Catalina	CSS	EUN	1.1 km	MPC · JPL
425194	2009 UD_{135}	—	October 24, 2009	Kitt Peak	Spacewatch	AEO	1.0 km	MPC · JPL
425195	2009 UX_{136}	—	October 25, 2009	Catalina	CSS	EUN	1.3 km	MPC · JPL
425196	2009 UC_{151}	—	October 24, 2009	Kitt Peak	Spacewatch	·	1.8 km	MPC · JPL
425197	2009 UO_{151}	—	September 28, 2009	Catalina	CSS	·	1.8 km	MPC · JPL
425198	2009 UM_{152}	—	October 26, 2009	Kitt Peak	Spacewatch	·	1.3 km	MPC · JPL
425199	2009 UY_{153}	—	October 18, 2009	Mount Lemmon	Mount Lemmon Survey	·	1.1 km	MPC · JPL
425200	2009 VS_{3}	—	November 8, 2009	Kitt Peak	Spacewatch	·	1.3 km	MPC · JPL

== 425201–425300 ==
back to top

Designation			Discovery			Properties		Ref
Permanent	Provisional	Named after	Date	Site	Discoverer(s)	Category	Diam.	Ref
425201	2009 VA_{4}	—	November 8, 2009	Kitt Peak	Spacewatch	·	1.4 km	MPC · JPL
425202	2009 VE_{8}	—	September 18, 2009	Mount Lemmon	Mount Lemmon Survey	·	1.5 km	MPC · JPL
425203	2009 VW_{14}	—	December 28, 2005	Kitt Peak	Spacewatch	·	1.8 km	MPC · JPL
425204	2009 VJ_{18}	—	December 25, 2005	Kitt Peak	Spacewatch	·	2.0 km	MPC · JPL
425205	2009 VA_{19}	—	December 10, 2005	Kitt Peak	Spacewatch	·	1.2 km	MPC · JPL
425206	2009 VR_{23}	—	November 9, 2009	Mount Lemmon	Mount Lemmon Survey	·	2.0 km	MPC · JPL
425207	2009 VD_{31}	—	November 9, 2009	Mount Lemmon	Mount Lemmon Survey	NEM	1.9 km	MPC · JPL
425208	2009 VM_{32}	—	November 9, 2009	Mount Lemmon	Mount Lemmon Survey	·	1.6 km	MPC · JPL
425209	2009 VL_{39}	—	November 10, 2009	Mount Lemmon	Mount Lemmon Survey	·	1.3 km	MPC · JPL
425210	2009 VG_{43}	—	October 24, 2009	Catalina	CSS	·	2.2 km	MPC · JPL
425211	2009 VA_{45}	—	November 11, 2009	Socorro	LINEAR	·	1.6 km	MPC · JPL
425212	2009 VW_{48}	—	November 10, 2009	Kitt Peak	Spacewatch	·	1.8 km	MPC · JPL
425213	2009 VH_{52}	—	November 10, 2009	Mount Lemmon	Mount Lemmon Survey	·	820 m	MPC · JPL
425214	2009 VA_{55}	—	November 10, 2009	Kitt Peak	Spacewatch	·	2.2 km	MPC · JPL
425215	2009 VQ_{55}	—	November 11, 2009	Kitt Peak	Spacewatch	MAR	1.1 km	MPC · JPL
425216	2009 VW_{61}	—	November 8, 2009	Kitt Peak	Spacewatch	·	1.3 km	MPC · JPL
425217	2009 VL_{63}	—	November 8, 2009	Kitt Peak	Spacewatch	AST	1.6 km	MPC · JPL
425218	2009 VQ_{63}	—	November 8, 2009	Kitt Peak	Spacewatch	EUN	1.6 km	MPC · JPL
425219	2009 VA_{66}	—	November 9, 2009	Kitt Peak	Spacewatch	·	1.8 km	MPC · JPL
425220	2009 VS_{66}	—	November 9, 2009	Kitt Peak	Spacewatch	NEM	1.9 km	MPC · JPL
425221	2009 VT_{66}	—	November 9, 2009	Kitt Peak	Spacewatch	·	1.6 km	MPC · JPL
425222	2009 VS_{67}	—	November 9, 2009	Kitt Peak	Spacewatch	·	2.7 km	MPC · JPL
425223	2009 VH_{68}	—	September 20, 2009	Mount Lemmon	Mount Lemmon Survey	·	1.8 km	MPC · JPL
425224	2009 VP_{69}	—	November 9, 2009	Mount Lemmon	Mount Lemmon Survey	·	1.5 km	MPC · JPL
425225	2009 VF_{80}	—	September 16, 2009	Catalina	CSS	JUN	1.6 km	MPC · JPL
425226	2009 VG_{87}	—	November 10, 2009	Kitt Peak	Spacewatch	·	3.3 km	MPC · JPL
425227	2009 VT_{89}	—	November 11, 2009	Kitt Peak	Spacewatch	·	2.8 km	MPC · JPL
425228	2009 VT_{90}	—	November 11, 2009	Kitt Peak	Spacewatch	·	1.6 km	MPC · JPL
425229	2009 VS_{95}	—	November 10, 2009	Kitt Peak	Spacewatch	·	2.1 km	MPC · JPL
425230	2009 VT_{95}	—	November 10, 2009	Kitt Peak	Spacewatch	·	2.5 km	MPC · JPL
425231	2009 VQ_{97}	—	September 20, 2009	Mount Lemmon	Mount Lemmon Survey	·	2.3 km	MPC · JPL
425232	2009 VP_{113}	—	October 22, 2009	Mount Lemmon	Mount Lemmon Survey	·	1.6 km	MPC · JPL
425233	2009 VR_{115}	—	November 8, 2009	Kitt Peak	Spacewatch	DOR	2.9 km	MPC · JPL
425234	2009 VL_{116}	—	November 11, 2009	Mount Lemmon	Mount Lemmon Survey	EOS	2.3 km	MPC · JPL
425235	2009 WZ_{5}	—	November 18, 2009	Plana	Fratev, F.	·	1.6 km	MPC · JPL
425236	2009 WE_{7}	—	November 8, 2009	Catalina	CSS	·	1.4 km	MPC · JPL
425237	2009 WL_{10}	—	November 19, 2009	Socorro	LINEAR	(5)	1.5 km	MPC · JPL
425238	2009 WQ_{12}	—	November 16, 2009	Mount Lemmon	Mount Lemmon Survey	·	1.4 km	MPC · JPL
425239	2009 WS_{17}	—	October 26, 2009	Kitt Peak	Spacewatch	·	1.7 km	MPC · JPL
425240	2009 WB_{19}	—	November 17, 2009	Mount Lemmon	Mount Lemmon Survey	KOR	1.2 km	MPC · JPL
425241	2009 WL_{30}	—	November 16, 2009	Kitt Peak	Spacewatch	MAR	1.5 km	MPC · JPL
425242	2009 WP_{32}	—	November 16, 2009	Mount Lemmon	Mount Lemmon Survey	·	1.5 km	MPC · JPL
425243	2009 WT_{42}	—	March 3, 2006	Anderson Mesa	LONEOS	·	2.7 km	MPC · JPL
425244	2009 WA_{44}	—	November 9, 2009	Mount Lemmon	Mount Lemmon Survey	MAR	980 m	MPC · JPL
425245	2009 WJ_{45}	—	November 9, 2009	Mount Lemmon	Mount Lemmon Survey	·	2.0 km	MPC · JPL
425246	2009 WC_{48}	—	October 26, 2009	Kitt Peak	Spacewatch	·	2.1 km	MPC · JPL
425247	2009 WP_{50}	—	November 19, 2009	La Sagra	OAM	·	2.2 km	MPC · JPL
425248	2009 WG_{51}	—	September 20, 2009	Kitt Peak	Spacewatch	·	2.2 km	MPC · JPL
425249	2009 WK_{52}	—	June 15, 2004	Kitt Peak	Spacewatch	·	2.0 km	MPC · JPL
425250	2009 WG_{54}	—	November 23, 2009	Mount Lemmon	Mount Lemmon Survey	AMO	210 m	MPC · JPL
425251	2009 WK_{62}	—	November 16, 2009	Mount Lemmon	Mount Lemmon Survey	·	1.8 km	MPC · JPL
425252	2009 WE_{65}	—	November 17, 2009	Mount Lemmon	Mount Lemmon Survey	·	1.6 km	MPC · JPL
425253	2009 WS_{70}	—	October 25, 2009	Kitt Peak	Spacewatch	MRX	1.0 km	MPC · JPL
425254	2009 WY_{72}	—	February 1, 2006	Mount Lemmon	Mount Lemmon Survey	·	1.4 km	MPC · JPL
425255	2009 WU_{77}	—	November 18, 2004	Campo Imperatore	CINEOS	·	2.6 km	MPC · JPL
425256	2009 WX_{78}	—	November 18, 2009	Mount Lemmon	Mount Lemmon Survey	·	890 m	MPC · JPL
425257	2009 WH_{79}	—	November 18, 2009	Mount Lemmon	Mount Lemmon Survey	·	1.4 km	MPC · JPL
425258	2009 WS_{84}	—	November 19, 2009	Kitt Peak	Spacewatch	·	1.6 km	MPC · JPL
425259	2009 WY_{85}	—	November 19, 2009	Kitt Peak	Spacewatch	·	2.1 km	MPC · JPL
425260	2009 WD_{86}	—	November 19, 2009	Kitt Peak	Spacewatch	WIT	800 m	MPC · JPL
425261	2009 WW_{86}	—	November 19, 2009	Kitt Peak	Spacewatch	·	2.7 km	MPC · JPL
425262	2009 WC_{87}	—	November 19, 2009	Kitt Peak	Spacewatch	·	3.5 km	MPC · JPL
425263	2009 WS_{88}	—	November 19, 2009	Kitt Peak	Spacewatch	·	2.3 km	MPC · JPL
425264	2009 WS_{95}	—	November 20, 2009	Mount Lemmon	Mount Lemmon Survey	·	1.4 km	MPC · JPL
425265	2009 WU_{105}	—	December 30, 2005	Mount Lemmon	Mount Lemmon Survey	·	2.3 km	MPC · JPL
425266	2009 WB_{113}	—	November 18, 2009	Kitt Peak	Spacewatch	·	1.9 km	MPC · JPL
425267	2009 WM_{113}	—	November 18, 2009	Mount Lemmon	Mount Lemmon Survey	·	1.6 km	MPC · JPL
425268	2009 WS_{117}	—	September 30, 2003	Kitt Peak	Spacewatch	·	2.4 km	MPC · JPL
425269	2009 WH_{127}	—	November 20, 2009	Kitt Peak	Spacewatch	EOS	2.0 km	MPC · JPL
425270	2009 WX_{127}	—	November 20, 2009	Kitt Peak	Spacewatch	·	1.3 km	MPC · JPL
425271	2009 WE_{128}	—	October 9, 2004	Kitt Peak	Spacewatch	·	1.9 km	MPC · JPL
425272	2009 WQ_{128}	—	October 23, 2009	Mount Lemmon	Mount Lemmon Survey	·	2.3 km	MPC · JPL
425273	2009 WH_{129}	—	October 27, 2009	Kitt Peak	Spacewatch	·	1.3 km	MPC · JPL
425274	2009 WC_{141}	—	November 18, 2009	Mount Lemmon	Mount Lemmon Survey	·	2.4 km	MPC · JPL
425275	2009 WY_{145}	—	November 19, 2009	Kitt Peak	Spacewatch	·	2.1 km	MPC · JPL
425276	2009 WG_{168}	—	October 25, 2009	Kitt Peak	Spacewatch	·	1.5 km	MPC · JPL
425277	2009 WT_{170}	—	November 10, 2009	Mount Lemmon	Mount Lemmon Survey	(5)	1.5 km	MPC · JPL
425278	2009 WD_{177}	—	November 23, 2009	Sandlot	G. Hug	·	1.5 km	MPC · JPL
425279	2009 WB_{180}	—	November 23, 2009	Kitt Peak	Spacewatch	ADE	2.3 km	MPC · JPL
425280	2009 WQ_{180}	—	November 23, 2009	Kitt Peak	Spacewatch	NEM	2.2 km	MPC · JPL
425281	2009 WB_{181}	—	November 23, 2009	Kitt Peak	Spacewatch	·	2.8 km	MPC · JPL
425282	2009 WH_{184}	—	August 18, 2009	Kitt Peak	Spacewatch	·	1.8 km	MPC · JPL
425283	2009 WD_{186}	—	October 30, 2009	Mount Lemmon	Mount Lemmon Survey	·	1.4 km	MPC · JPL
425284	2009 WR_{190}	—	November 24, 2009	Kitt Peak	Spacewatch	·	1.5 km	MPC · JPL
425285	2009 WQ_{191}	—	November 9, 2009	Kitt Peak	Spacewatch	·	1.9 km	MPC · JPL
425286	2009 WA_{202}	—	November 9, 2009	Catalina	CSS	·	3.4 km	MPC · JPL
425287	2009 WR_{205}	—	November 17, 2009	Kitt Peak	Spacewatch	·	1.7 km	MPC · JPL
425288	2009 WK_{208}	—	November 17, 2009	Kitt Peak	Spacewatch	AEO	1.1 km	MPC · JPL
425289	2009 WS_{209}	—	November 17, 2009	Kitt Peak	Spacewatch	·	1.9 km	MPC · JPL
425290	2009 WD_{211}	—	November 18, 2009	Kitt Peak	Spacewatch	·	1.5 km	MPC · JPL
425291	2009 WK_{213}	—	November 18, 2009	La Sagra	OAM	JUN	1.3 km	MPC · JPL
425292	2009 WP_{213}	—	October 16, 2009	Catalina	CSS	EUN	1.3 km	MPC · JPL
425293	2009 WU_{224}	—	November 16, 2009	Mount Lemmon	Mount Lemmon Survey	·	5.8 km	MPC · JPL
425294	2009 WH_{250}	—	November 17, 2009	Kitt Peak	Spacewatch	·	1.5 km	MPC · JPL
425295	2009 WN_{251}	—	October 12, 2009	Mount Lemmon	Mount Lemmon Survey	·	2.2 km	MPC · JPL
425296	2009 WR_{262}	—	November 21, 2009	Mount Lemmon	Mount Lemmon Survey	EOS	2.4 km	MPC · JPL
425297	2009 XR_{3}	—	December 9, 2009	La Sagra	OAM	·	1.9 km	MPC · JPL
425298	2009 XF_{19}	—	December 15, 2009	Mount Lemmon	Mount Lemmon Survey	EOS	2.1 km	MPC · JPL
425299	2009 XA_{21}	—	December 15, 2009	Mount Lemmon	Mount Lemmon Survey	·	1.9 km	MPC · JPL
425300	2009 XV_{21}	—	December 15, 2009	Bergisch Gladbach	W. Bickel	ADE	2.7 km	MPC · JPL

== 425301–425400 ==
back to top

Designation			Discovery			Properties		Ref
Permanent	Provisional	Named after	Date	Site	Discoverer(s)	Category	Diam.	Ref
425301	2009 XR_{23}	—	October 1, 2003	Kitt Peak	Spacewatch	·	2.1 km	MPC · JPL
425302	2009 XW_{23}	—	January 10, 2010	Mount Lemmon	Mount Lemmon Survey	·	2.3 km	MPC · JPL
425303	2009 YU	—	September 27, 2009	Kitt Peak	Spacewatch	·	1.4 km	MPC · JPL
425304	2009 YU_{4}	—	December 17, 2009	Mount Lemmon	Mount Lemmon Survey	·	2.3 km	MPC · JPL
425305	2009 YU_{8}	—	September 20, 2009	Kitt Peak	Spacewatch	·	2.3 km	MPC · JPL
425306	2009 YX_{12}	—	December 18, 2009	Mount Lemmon	Mount Lemmon Survey	·	2.5 km	MPC · JPL
425307	2009 YU_{13}	—	December 18, 2009	Mount Lemmon	Mount Lemmon Survey	·	3.7 km	MPC · JPL
425308	2009 YT_{14}	—	December 18, 2009	Mount Lemmon	Mount Lemmon Survey	·	4.4 km	MPC · JPL
425309	2009 YJ_{17}	—	December 20, 2009	Kitt Peak	Spacewatch	·	2.2 km	MPC · JPL
425310	2009 YZ_{18}	—	January 26, 2006	Mount Lemmon	Mount Lemmon Survey	·	2.0 km	MPC · JPL
425311	2009 YE_{23}	—	March 9, 2005	Catalina	CSS	·	2.4 km	MPC · JPL
425312	2009 YY_{24}	—	December 19, 2009	Kitt Peak	Spacewatch	VER	4.1 km	MPC · JPL
425313	2010 AA_{2}	—	January 6, 2010	Bisei SG Center	BATTeRS	·	3.8 km	MPC · JPL
425314	2010 AU_{3}	—	December 20, 2009	Kitt Peak	Spacewatch	·	2.6 km	MPC · JPL
425315	2010 AP_{6}	—	January 6, 2010	Kitt Peak	Spacewatch	·	6.1 km	MPC · JPL
425316	2010 AQ_{7}	—	January 6, 2010	Kitt Peak	Spacewatch	·	1.5 km	MPC · JPL
425317	2010 AB_{12}	—	January 6, 2010	Catalina	CSS	·	2.7 km	MPC · JPL
425318	2010 AA_{13}	—	January 7, 2010	Mount Lemmon	Mount Lemmon Survey	·	2.4 km	MPC · JPL
425319	2010 AJ_{14}	—	January 7, 2010	Kitt Peak	Spacewatch	HYG	3.3 km	MPC · JPL
425320	2010 AA_{23}	—	January 6, 2010	Kitt Peak	Spacewatch	HYG	3.0 km	MPC · JPL
425321	2010 AN_{33}	—	January 7, 2010	Kitt Peak	Spacewatch	·	2.9 km	MPC · JPL
425322	2010 AZ_{50}	—	January 8, 2010	Kitt Peak	Spacewatch	·	2.7 km	MPC · JPL
425323	2010 AE_{51}	—	January 8, 2010	Kitt Peak	Spacewatch	·	3.8 km	MPC · JPL
425324	2010 AV_{51}	—	January 8, 2010	Mount Lemmon	Mount Lemmon Survey	·	2.5 km	MPC · JPL
425325	2010 AZ_{53}	—	March 2, 2006	Kitt Peak	Spacewatch	·	2.2 km	MPC · JPL
425326	2010 AS_{55}	—	January 8, 2010	Kitt Peak	Spacewatch	·	3.9 km	MPC · JPL
425327	2010 AA_{56}	—	January 8, 2010	Kitt Peak	Spacewatch	·	1.5 km	MPC · JPL
425328	2010 AD_{58}	—	January 15, 2005	Kitt Peak	Spacewatch	·	1.7 km	MPC · JPL
425329	2010 AW_{58}	—	January 11, 2010	Kitt Peak	Spacewatch	·	4.4 km	MPC · JPL
425330	2010 AY_{59}	—	January 7, 2010	Catalina	CSS	H	810 m	MPC · JPL
425331	2010 AO_{63}	—	November 21, 2009	Mount Lemmon	Mount Lemmon Survey	·	2.3 km	MPC · JPL
425332	2010 AY_{66}	—	January 11, 2010	Kitt Peak	Spacewatch	·	4.7 km	MPC · JPL
425333	2010 AU_{74}	—	January 8, 2010	Catalina	CSS	H	820 m	MPC · JPL
425334	2010 AV_{74}	—	October 3, 2003	Kitt Peak	Spacewatch	EOS	2.0 km	MPC · JPL
425335	2010 AC_{87}	—	April 13, 2005	Catalina	CSS	·	3.2 km	MPC · JPL
425336	2010 AL_{93}	—	January 8, 2010	WISE	WISE	·	4.6 km	MPC · JPL
425337	2010 AR_{105}	—	January 12, 2010	WISE	WISE	·	4.2 km	MPC · JPL
425338	2010 AY_{109}	—	December 1, 2008	Kitt Peak	Spacewatch	·	2.3 km	MPC · JPL
425339	2010 AX_{110}	—	January 13, 2010	WISE	WISE	·	3.7 km	MPC · JPL
425340	2010 AE_{111}	—	January 13, 2010	WISE	WISE	·	4.9 km	MPC · JPL
425341	2010 AN_{124}	—	April 20, 2010	Mount Lemmon	Mount Lemmon Survey	·	3.5 km	MPC · JPL
425342	2010 AP_{124}	—	January 11, 2010	Kitt Peak	Spacewatch	LIX	3.6 km	MPC · JPL
425343	2010 BX_{3}	—	September 21, 2008	Kitt Peak	Spacewatch	AGN	2.0 km	MPC · JPL
425344	2010 BY_{4}	—	January 17, 2010	Kitt Peak	Spacewatch	(31811)	3.2 km	MPC · JPL
425345	2010 BD_{22}	—	January 17, 2010	WISE	WISE	THB	3.1 km	MPC · JPL
425346	2010 BP_{25}	—	January 17, 2010	WISE	WISE	·	4.0 km	MPC · JPL
425347	2010 BP_{32}	—	January 18, 2010	WISE	WISE	·	2.6 km	MPC · JPL
425348	2010 BY_{34}	—	September 6, 2008	Kitt Peak	Spacewatch	L4	10 km	MPC · JPL
425349	2010 BV_{40}	—	October 30, 2008	Mount Lemmon	Mount Lemmon Survey	VER	3.5 km	MPC · JPL
425350	2010 BQ_{42}	—	January 19, 2010	WISE	WISE	·	4.0 km	MPC · JPL
425351	2010 BP_{43}	—	January 19, 2010	WISE	WISE	·	3.4 km	MPC · JPL
425352	2010 BX_{46}	—	October 20, 2007	Mount Lemmon	Mount Lemmon Survey	URS	4.1 km	MPC · JPL
425353	2010 BM_{52}	—	September 24, 2009	Catalina	CSS	·	1.7 km	MPC · JPL
425354	2010 BC_{53}	—	April 6, 2010	Catalina	CSS	·	4.7 km	MPC · JPL
425355	2010 BM_{53}	—	March 17, 2004	Socorro	LINEAR	·	5.8 km	MPC · JPL
425356	2010 BV_{63}	—	March 15, 2004	Kitt Peak	Spacewatch	·	4.3 km	MPC · JPL
425357	2010 BX_{65}	—	April 8, 2010	Catalina	CSS	URS	3.7 km	MPC · JPL
425358	2010 BZ_{74}	—	January 15, 2009	Kitt Peak	Spacewatch	·	2.4 km	MPC · JPL
425359	2010 BM_{75}	—	April 14, 2010	Kitt Peak	Spacewatch	SYL · CYB	6.8 km	MPC · JPL
425360	2010 BX_{77}	—	May 4, 2005	Kitt Peak	Spacewatch	·	3.5 km	MPC · JPL
425361	2010 BU_{78}	—	September 16, 2006	Catalina	CSS	·	5.6 km	MPC · JPL
425362	2010 BM_{87}	—	October 9, 2002	Kitt Peak	Spacewatch	·	3.0 km	MPC · JPL
425363	2010 BS_{87}	—	October 21, 2006	Kitt Peak	Spacewatch	·	4.1 km	MPC · JPL
425364	2010 BQ_{97}	—	September 15, 2006	Kitt Peak	Spacewatch	·	3.6 km	MPC · JPL
425365	2010 BF_{129}	—	October 26, 2009	Mount Lemmon	Mount Lemmon Survey	·	2.8 km	MPC · JPL
425366	2010 CX_{2}	—	February 5, 2010	Kitt Peak	Spacewatch	·	3.5 km	MPC · JPL
425367	2010 CF_{3}	—	February 5, 2010	Kitt Peak	Spacewatch	H	490 m	MPC · JPL
425368	2010 CQ_{4}	—	November 16, 2009	Kitt Peak	Spacewatch	·	3.0 km	MPC · JPL
425369	2010 CF_{6}	—	February 6, 2010	WISE	WISE	·	4.5 km	MPC · JPL
425370	2010 CQ_{6}	—	February 6, 2010	WISE	WISE	·	5.1 km	MPC · JPL
425371	2010 CQ_{18}	—	January 7, 2010	Kitt Peak	Spacewatch	·	2.4 km	MPC · JPL
425372	2010 CU_{28}	—	February 9, 2010	Kitt Peak	Spacewatch	·	2.7 km	MPC · JPL
425373	2010 CU_{31}	—	February 9, 2010	Mount Lemmon	Mount Lemmon Survey	·	4.1 km	MPC · JPL
425374	2010 CU_{33}	—	February 6, 2010	Mount Lemmon	Mount Lemmon Survey	·	3.6 km	MPC · JPL
425375	2010 CP_{35}	—	February 10, 2010	Kitt Peak	Spacewatch	·	2.5 km	MPC · JPL
425376	2010 CT_{35}	—	February 10, 2010	Kitt Peak	Spacewatch	·	3.6 km	MPC · JPL
425377	2010 CA_{36}	—	January 8, 2010	Mount Lemmon	Mount Lemmon Survey	·	5.0 km	MPC · JPL
425378	2010 CZ_{37}	—	December 20, 2009	Mount Lemmon	Mount Lemmon Survey	EMA	3.7 km	MPC · JPL
425379	2010 CA_{41}	—	February 13, 2010	Mount Lemmon	Mount Lemmon Survey	·	2.2 km	MPC · JPL
425380	2010 CZ_{41}	—	February 6, 2010	Mount Lemmon	Mount Lemmon Survey	·	2.3 km	MPC · JPL
425381	2010 CB_{44}	—	February 13, 2010	Nogales	L. Elenin	·	2.8 km	MPC · JPL
425382	2010 CA_{45}	—	February 11, 2010	WISE	WISE	·	4.6 km	MPC · JPL
425383	2010 CR_{47}	—	February 12, 2010	WISE	WISE	LIX	4.0 km	MPC · JPL
425384	2010 CQ_{55}	—	January 12, 2010	Mount Lemmon	Mount Lemmon Survey	·	2.7 km	MPC · JPL
425385	2010 CU_{59}	—	November 20, 2009	Kitt Peak	Spacewatch	·	3.7 km	MPC · JPL
425386	2010 CO_{60}	—	February 14, 2010	Socorro	LINEAR	·	2.6 km	MPC · JPL
425387	2010 CZ_{61}	—	February 9, 2010	Kitt Peak	Spacewatch	·	3.8 km	MPC · JPL
425388	2010 CA_{62}	—	February 9, 2010	Kitt Peak	Spacewatch	·	4.2 km	MPC · JPL
425389	2010 CT_{62}	—	April 1, 2005	Kitt Peak	Spacewatch	·	3.1 km	MPC · JPL
425390	2010 CB_{63}	—	February 9, 2010	Catalina	CSS	·	3.4 km	MPC · JPL
425391	2010 CM_{63}	—	March 9, 2005	Mount Lemmon	Mount Lemmon Survey	·	2.2 km	MPC · JPL
425392	2010 CV_{68}	—	February 10, 2010	Kitt Peak	Spacewatch	·	3.1 km	MPC · JPL
425393	2010 CJ_{71}	—	February 13, 2010	Mount Lemmon	Mount Lemmon Survey	LIX	3.4 km	MPC · JPL
425394	2010 CU_{76}	—	February 13, 2010	Kitt Peak	Spacewatch	BRA	1.4 km	MPC · JPL
425395	2010 CM_{78}	—	February 13, 2010	Mount Lemmon	Mount Lemmon Survey	·	3.1 km	MPC · JPL
425396	2010 CC_{79}	—	October 31, 2008	Kitt Peak	Spacewatch	·	2.2 km	MPC · JPL
425397	2010 CC_{81}	—	February 13, 2010	Mount Lemmon	Mount Lemmon Survey	·	5.1 km	MPC · JPL
425398	2010 CD_{82}	—	February 12, 1999	Kitt Peak	Spacewatch	·	2.5 km	MPC · JPL
425399	2010 CO_{85}	—	February 14, 2010	Kitt Peak	Spacewatch	·	1.8 km	MPC · JPL
425400	2010 CG_{93}	—	February 14, 2010	Kitt Peak	Spacewatch	·	1.7 km	MPC · JPL

== 425401–425500 ==
back to top

Designation			Discovery			Properties		Ref
Permanent	Provisional	Named after	Date	Site	Discoverer(s)	Category	Diam.	Ref
425401	2010 CT_{93}	—	February 14, 2010	Kitt Peak	Spacewatch	·	3.4 km	MPC · JPL
425402	2010 CE_{95}	—	February 14, 2010	Kitt Peak	Spacewatch	·	2.4 km	MPC · JPL
425403	2010 CP_{103}	—	February 14, 2010	Kitt Peak	Spacewatch	·	2.3 km	MPC · JPL
425404	2010 CU_{109}	—	January 18, 1994	Kitt Peak	Spacewatch	·	1.9 km	MPC · JPL
425405	2010 CR_{115}	—	January 19, 2005	Kitt Peak	Spacewatch	KOR	1.4 km	MPC · JPL
425406	2010 CR_{125}	—	February 15, 2010	Kitt Peak	Spacewatch	·	2.4 km	MPC · JPL
425407	2010 CS_{138}	—	December 19, 2009	Mount Lemmon	Mount Lemmon Survey	EOS	2.1 km	MPC · JPL
425408	2010 CS_{141}	—	February 13, 2010	Catalina	CSS	·	4.1 km	MPC · JPL
425409	2010 CN_{142}	—	February 6, 2010	Mount Lemmon	Mount Lemmon Survey	·	4.0 km	MPC · JPL
425410	2010 CT_{153}	—	February 14, 2010	Catalina	CSS	H	590 m	MPC · JPL
425411	2010 CA_{154}	—	October 1, 2008	Mount Lemmon	Mount Lemmon Survey	·	1.8 km	MPC · JPL
425412	2010 CS_{157}	—	February 15, 2010	Kitt Peak	Spacewatch	·	3.1 km	MPC · JPL
425413	2010 CC_{160}	—	February 15, 2010	Mount Lemmon	Mount Lemmon Survey	·	2.2 km	MPC · JPL
425414	2010 CL_{161}	—	February 6, 2010	Mount Lemmon	Mount Lemmon Survey	·	2.7 km	MPC · JPL
425415	2010 CT_{161}	—	February 6, 2010	Kitt Peak	Spacewatch	THM	2.2 km	MPC · JPL
425416	2010 CV_{161}	—	February 6, 2010	Kitt Peak	Spacewatch	EOS	2.0 km	MPC · JPL
425417	2010 CM_{164}	—	January 11, 2010	Kitt Peak	Spacewatch	·	4.6 km	MPC · JPL
425418	2010 CE_{165}	—	February 10, 2010	Kitt Peak	Spacewatch	·	3.1 km	MPC · JPL
425419	2010 CS_{181}	—	June 21, 2007	Mount Lemmon	Mount Lemmon Survey	WIT	1.2 km	MPC · JPL
425420	2010 CQ_{185}	—	October 23, 2009	Mount Lemmon	Mount Lemmon Survey	·	3.8 km	MPC · JPL
425421	2010 CR_{185}	—	February 13, 2010	Mount Lemmon	Mount Lemmon Survey	·	3.5 km	MPC · JPL
425422	2010 CY_{218}	—	January 29, 2009	Mount Lemmon	Mount Lemmon Survey	·	3.6 km	MPC · JPL
425423	2010 DZ	—	September 10, 2007	Mount Lemmon	Mount Lemmon Survey	NEM	2.3 km	MPC · JPL
425424	2010 DP_{2}	—	March 9, 2005	Mount Lemmon	Mount Lemmon Survey	·	2.3 km	MPC · JPL
425425	2010 DU_{8}	—	February 16, 2010	Kitt Peak	Spacewatch	·	2.9 km	MPC · JPL
425426	2010 DE_{12}	—	February 19, 2010	Magdalena Ridge	Ryan, W. H.	·	3.7 km	MPC · JPL
425427	2010 DW_{21}	—	February 14, 2010	Catalina	CSS	·	5.6 km	MPC · JPL
425428	2010 DL_{38}	—	March 8, 2005	Kitt Peak	Spacewatch	·	2.5 km	MPC · JPL
425429	2010 DT_{42}	—	February 17, 2010	Kitt Peak	Spacewatch	VER	2.6 km	MPC · JPL
425430	2010 DJ_{44}	—	February 17, 2010	Kitt Peak	Spacewatch	·	3.0 km	MPC · JPL
425431	2010 DJ_{45}	—	February 6, 2010	Kitt Peak	Spacewatch	EOS	2.1 km	MPC · JPL
425432	2010 DH_{49}	—	February 18, 2010	Kitt Peak	Spacewatch	H	430 m	MPC · JPL
425433	2010 DL_{49}	—	February 18, 2010	Kitt Peak	Spacewatch	·	3.1 km	MPC · JPL
425434	2010 DO_{51}	—	February 21, 2010	WISE	WISE	THB	3.8 km	MPC · JPL
425435	2010 DU_{56}	—	February 23, 2010	WISE	WISE	T_{j} (2.95)	3.5 km	MPC · JPL
425436	2010 DY_{57}	—	September 30, 2009	Mount Lemmon	Mount Lemmon Survey	·	2.7 km	MPC · JPL
425437	2010 DA_{74}	—	August 25, 2001	Kitt Peak	Spacewatch	·	2.9 km	MPC · JPL
425438	2010 DK_{76}	—	October 8, 2007	Catalina	CSS	·	2.5 km	MPC · JPL
425439	2010 DS_{76}	—	March 9, 2005	Kitt Peak	Spacewatch	H	680 m	MPC · JPL
425440	2010 DJ_{78}	—	February 20, 2010	Vail-Jarnac	Jarnac	LIX	4.4 km	MPC · JPL
425441	2010 EZ_{11}	—	March 13, 2005	Mount Lemmon	Mount Lemmon Survey	·	2.3 km	MPC · JPL
425442 Eberstadt	2010 EJ_{12}	Eberstadt	March 7, 2010	Bergen-Enkheim	Suessenberger, U.	·	2.2 km	MPC · JPL
425443	2010 EX_{31}	—	August 24, 2007	Kitt Peak	Spacewatch	·	1.6 km	MPC · JPL
425444	2010 EQ_{33}	—	March 4, 2010	Kitt Peak	Spacewatch	THM	2.5 km	MPC · JPL
425445	2010 EC_{35}	—	September 12, 2007	Mount Lemmon	Mount Lemmon Survey	·	3.1 km	MPC · JPL
425446	2010 EJ_{42}	—	March 12, 2010	Kachina	Hobart, J.	·	2.4 km	MPC · JPL
425447	2010 EL_{43}	—	December 19, 2004	Anderson Mesa	LONEOS	·	2.3 km	MPC · JPL
425448	2010 EA_{45}	—	March 13, 2010	Dauban	Kugel, F.	·	3.0 km	MPC · JPL
425449	2010 EL_{45}	—	March 14, 2010	Dauban	Kugel, F.	·	4.2 km	MPC · JPL
425450	2010 EV_{45}	—	March 15, 2010	La Sagra	OAM	AMO	430 m	MPC · JPL
425451	2010 EX_{45}	—	March 15, 2010	Catalina	CSS	H	470 m	MPC · JPL
425452	2010 ED_{46}	—	March 13, 2010	Catalina	CSS	·	3.1 km	MPC · JPL
425453	2010 ED_{67}	—	March 12, 2010	Catalina	CSS	·	2.5 km	MPC · JPL
425454	2010 EO_{67}	—	March 12, 2010	Mount Lemmon	Mount Lemmon Survey	H	610 m	MPC · JPL
425455	2010 EU_{67}	—	March 13, 2010	Kitt Peak	Spacewatch	·	3.4 km	MPC · JPL
425456	2010 EJ_{71}	—	February 18, 2010	Mount Lemmon	Mount Lemmon Survey	·	1.8 km	MPC · JPL
425457	2010 EE_{77}	—	March 12, 2010	Kitt Peak	Spacewatch	·	2.3 km	MPC · JPL
425458	2010 ET_{78}	—	March 12, 2010	Mount Lemmon	Mount Lemmon Survey	·	3.5 km	MPC · JPL
425459	2010 EL_{88}	—	February 15, 2010	Catalina	CSS	·	2.3 km	MPC · JPL
425460	2010 EU_{91}	—	February 12, 2004	Kitt Peak	Spacewatch	·	2.9 km	MPC · JPL
425461	2010 EN_{92}	—	March 10, 2005	Mount Lemmon	Mount Lemmon Survey	·	2.5 km	MPC · JPL
425462	2010 EQ_{92}	—	March 14, 2010	Kitt Peak	Spacewatch	·	1.6 km	MPC · JPL
425463	2010 EO_{93}	—	April 2, 2005	Kitt Peak	Spacewatch	·	2.5 km	MPC · JPL
425464	2010 EC_{96}	—	October 6, 1996	Kitt Peak	Spacewatch	·	2.6 km	MPC · JPL
425465	2010 EV_{98}	—	March 14, 2010	Kitt Peak	Spacewatch	·	4.2 km	MPC · JPL
425466	2010 EY_{100}	—	March 15, 2010	Kitt Peak	Spacewatch	·	4.8 km	MPC · JPL
425467	2010 EB_{101}	—	August 10, 2007	Kitt Peak	Spacewatch	·	1.9 km	MPC · JPL
425468	2010 EK_{106}	—	March 14, 2010	Catalina	CSS	H	710 m	MPC · JPL
425469	2010 EX_{106}	—	March 11, 2010	Moletai	K. Černis, Zdanavicius, J.	·	3.6 km	MPC · JPL
425470	2010 EG_{107}	—	March 12, 2010	Kitt Peak	Spacewatch	·	3.3 km	MPC · JPL
425471	2010 EU_{108}	—	March 14, 2010	Kitt Peak	Spacewatch	·	4.3 km	MPC · JPL
425472	2010 EE_{110}	—	March 4, 2010	Kitt Peak	Spacewatch	·	4.4 km	MPC · JPL
425473	2010 EG_{112}	—	March 12, 2010	Kitt Peak	Spacewatch	·	3.1 km	MPC · JPL
425474	2010 EU_{125}	—	March 13, 2010	Catalina	CSS	·	3.1 km	MPC · JPL
425475	2010 EN_{126}	—	March 14, 2010	Catalina	CSS	·	3.7 km	MPC · JPL
425476	2010 EY_{127}	—	March 15, 2010	Catalina	CSS	·	4.8 km	MPC · JPL
425477	2010 ET_{135}	—	March 13, 2010	Kitt Peak	Spacewatch	·	3.8 km	MPC · JPL
425478	2010 EC_{142}	—	March 13, 2010	Mount Lemmon	Mount Lemmon Survey	·	4.2 km	MPC · JPL
425479	2010 FO_{4}	—	March 16, 2010	Mount Lemmon	Mount Lemmon Survey	URS	4.7 km	MPC · JPL
425480	2010 FF_{5}	—	March 16, 2010	Purple Mountain	PMO NEO Survey Program	·	3.5 km	MPC · JPL
425481	2010 FK_{10}	—	March 18, 2010	Mount Lemmon	Mount Lemmon Survey	·	3.3 km	MPC · JPL
425482	2010 FH_{12}	—	September 20, 2007	Kitt Peak	Spacewatch	·	2.5 km	MPC · JPL
425483	2010 FA_{18}	—	March 18, 2010	Mount Lemmon	Mount Lemmon Survey	·	5.0 km	MPC · JPL
425484	2010 FQ_{19}	—	March 11, 2005	Kitt Peak	Spacewatch	EOS	1.8 km	MPC · JPL
425485	2010 FP_{46}	—	October 15, 2009	Mount Lemmon	Mount Lemmon Survey	·	4.5 km	MPC · JPL
425486	2010 FV_{47}	—	June 10, 2005	Kitt Peak	Spacewatch	·	2.4 km	MPC · JPL
425487	2010 FM_{54}	—	March 21, 2010	Catalina	CSS	EOS	2.1 km	MPC · JPL
425488	2010 FP_{90}	—	January 8, 2010	Mount Lemmon	Mount Lemmon Survey	·	3.5 km	MPC · JPL
425489	2010 FW_{93}	—	February 18, 2010	Mount Lemmon	Mount Lemmon Survey	·	2.1 km	MPC · JPL
425490	2010 GF_{24}	—	February 12, 2004	Kitt Peak	Spacewatch	·	2.7 km	MPC · JPL
425491	2010 GL_{25}	—	April 8, 2010	La Sagra	OAM	·	4.8 km	MPC · JPL
425492	2010 GN_{27}	—	April 5, 2010	Kitt Peak	Spacewatch	·	3.6 km	MPC · JPL
425493	2010 GG_{31}	—	June 3, 2005	Kitt Peak	Spacewatch	·	2.0 km	MPC · JPL
425494	2010 GC_{67}	—	April 11, 2010	Vail	Observatory, Jarnac	·	4.9 km	MPC · JPL
425495	2010 GF_{67}	—	March 15, 2010	Catalina	CSS	·	2.8 km	MPC · JPL
425496	2010 GF_{98}	—	April 10, 2010	Kitt Peak	Spacewatch	·	3.1 km	MPC · JPL
425497	2010 GK_{101}	—	April 5, 2010	Kitt Peak	Spacewatch	HYG	3.7 km	MPC · JPL
425498	2010 GZ_{105}	—	April 7, 2010	Kitt Peak	Spacewatch	·	4.2 km	MPC · JPL
425499	2010 GS_{110}	—	August 19, 2006	Kitt Peak	Spacewatch	·	2.3 km	MPC · JPL
425500	2010 GU_{124}	—	April 7, 2010	Kitt Peak	Spacewatch	·	4.3 km	MPC · JPL

== 425501–425600 ==
back to top

Designation			Discovery			Properties		Ref
Permanent	Provisional	Named after	Date	Site	Discoverer(s)	Category	Diam.	Ref
425501	2010 GA_{125}	—	April 7, 2010	Kitt Peak	Spacewatch	·	4.3 km	MPC · JPL
425502	2010 GH_{139}	—	October 2, 2008	Mount Lemmon	Mount Lemmon Survey	·	2.0 km	MPC · JPL
425503	2010 GR_{146}	—	April 7, 2010	Catalina	CSS	·	3.9 km	MPC · JPL
425504	2010 GT_{171}	—	March 20, 2010	Catalina	CSS	·	3.3 km	MPC · JPL
425505	2010 GW_{171}	—	November 21, 2008	Kitt Peak	Spacewatch	EOS	2.3 km	MPC · JPL
425506	2010 HB_{41}	—	April 22, 2010	WISE	WISE	·	1.9 km	MPC · JPL
425507	2010 HV_{105}	—	November 18, 2007	Mount Lemmon	Mount Lemmon Survey	·	3.1 km	MPC · JPL
425508	2010 HE_{106}	—	September 28, 2006	Kitt Peak	Spacewatch	·	2.7 km	MPC · JPL
425509 Valyavin	2010 JM_{34}	Valyavin	May 7, 2010	Zelenchukskaya	T. V. Krjačko, B. Satovski	·	4.3 km	MPC · JPL
425510	2010 JW_{44}	—	May 7, 2010	Mount Lemmon	Mount Lemmon Survey	·	3.1 km	MPC · JPL
425511	2010 JR_{61}	—	May 8, 2010	WISE	WISE	·	3.3 km	MPC · JPL
425512	2010 JS_{72}	—	May 6, 2010	Kitt Peak	Spacewatch	·	3.1 km	MPC · JPL
425513	2010 JA_{84}	—	April 11, 2010	Mount Lemmon	Mount Lemmon Survey	·	4.0 km	MPC · JPL
425514	2010 JF_{116}	—	September 17, 2006	Catalina	CSS	·	2.8 km	MPC · JPL
425515	2010 JD_{150}	—	October 6, 1996	Kitt Peak	Spacewatch	EOS	2.0 km	MPC · JPL
425516	2010 JX_{177}	—	November 19, 2008	Kitt Peak	Spacewatch	EOS	2.7 km	MPC · JPL
425517	2010 KK_{54}	—	May 23, 2010	WISE	WISE	·	1.3 km	MPC · JPL
425518	2010 LF_{1}	—	March 24, 2004	Siding Spring	SSS	THB	3.7 km	MPC · JPL
425519	2010 LL_{11}	—	June 2, 2010	WISE	WISE	·	1.7 km	MPC · JPL
425520	2010 LU_{61}	—	June 4, 2010	Catalina	CSS	·	1.4 km	MPC · JPL
425521	2010 LD_{85}	—	October 16, 2007	Mount Lemmon	Mount Lemmon Survey	LIX	3.7 km	MPC · JPL
425522	2010 MS_{26}	—	June 19, 2010	WISE	WISE	·	1.3 km	MPC · JPL
425523	2010 MR_{82}	—	June 27, 2010	WISE	WISE	ERI	1.7 km	MPC · JPL
425524	2010 MT_{105}	—	October 25, 2003	Kitt Peak	Spacewatch	·	2.3 km	MPC · JPL
425525	2010 NL_{11}	—	January 30, 2009	Mount Lemmon	Mount Lemmon Survey	CYB	3.5 km	MPC · JPL
425526	2010 NV_{42}	—	October 31, 1986	Palomar	E. F. Helin	PHO	1.8 km	MPC · JPL
425527	2010 ND_{110}	—	July 13, 2010	WISE	WISE	·	2.0 km	MPC · JPL
425528	2010 OJ	—	May 25, 2006	Mount Lemmon	Mount Lemmon Survey	·	1.2 km	MPC · JPL
425529	2010 OK_{44}	—	July 21, 2010	WISE	WISE	PHO	1.2 km	MPC · JPL
425530	2010 OQ_{50}	—	December 18, 2007	Mount Lemmon	Mount Lemmon Survey	·	1.0 km	MPC · JPL
425531	2010 OJ_{68}	—	November 20, 2000	Socorro	LINEAR	·	1.5 km	MPC · JPL
425532	2010 OY_{95}	—	July 28, 2010	WISE	WISE	·	3.9 km	MPC · JPL
425533	2010 OO_{96}	—	September 16, 2006	Siding Spring	SSS	PHO	1.5 km	MPC · JPL
425534	2010 OZ_{111}	—	July 29, 2010	WISE	WISE	·	3.0 km	MPC · JPL
425535	2010 OJ_{121}	—	July 31, 2010	WISE	WISE	·	3.3 km	MPC · JPL
425536	2010 PE_{26}	—	August 10, 2010	Kitt Peak	Spacewatch	L4	10 km	MPC · JPL
425537	2010 PE_{45}	—	December 31, 2007	Kitt Peak	Spacewatch	·	1.4 km	MPC · JPL
425538	2010 PV_{62}	—	December 4, 2007	Catalina	CSS	·	720 m	MPC · JPL
425539	2010 RF_{11}	—	September 2, 2010	Mount Lemmon	Mount Lemmon Survey	·	610 m	MPC · JPL
425540	2010 RC_{14}	—	September 1, 2010	Mount Lemmon	Mount Lemmon Survey	(883)	740 m	MPC · JPL
425541	2010 RO_{39}	—	September 2, 2010	Socorro	LINEAR	·	940 m	MPC · JPL
425542	2010 RE_{40}	—	March 21, 2009	Kitt Peak	Spacewatch	PHO	1.1 km	MPC · JPL
425543	2010 RM_{51}	—	September 4, 2010	Kitt Peak	Spacewatch	·	740 m	MPC · JPL
425544	2010 RL_{55}	—	September 5, 2010	Mount Lemmon	Mount Lemmon Survey	·	720 m	MPC · JPL
425545	2010 RG_{59}	—	September 6, 2010	Kitt Peak	Spacewatch	·	1.2 km	MPC · JPL
425546	2010 RE_{67}	—	September 5, 2010	Dauban	Kugel, F.	·	950 m	MPC · JPL
425547	2010 RK_{87}	—	September 2, 2010	Mount Lemmon	Mount Lemmon Survey	·	650 m	MPC · JPL
425548	2010 RD_{103}	—	September 10, 2010	Kitt Peak	Spacewatch	·	1.1 km	MPC · JPL
425549	2010 RM_{103}	—	September 10, 2010	Kitt Peak	Spacewatch	·	660 m	MPC · JPL
425550	2010 RA_{104}	—	December 30, 2007	Mount Lemmon	Mount Lemmon Survey	·	570 m	MPC · JPL
425551	2010 RM_{113}	—	May 31, 2006	Mount Lemmon	Mount Lemmon Survey	·	740 m	MPC · JPL
425552	2010 RH_{115}	—	September 11, 2010	Kitt Peak	Spacewatch	·	600 m	MPC · JPL
425553	2010 RS_{115}	—	September 11, 2010	Catalina	CSS	·	790 m	MPC · JPL
425554	2010 RJ_{119}	—	November 13, 2007	Mount Lemmon	Mount Lemmon Survey	·	630 m	MPC · JPL
425555	2010 RU_{120}	—	August 22, 2003	Campo Imperatore	CINEOS	·	890 m	MPC · JPL
425556	2010 RY_{125}	—	August 5, 2010	Kitt Peak	Spacewatch	·	690 m	MPC · JPL
425557	2010 RU_{136}	—	October 9, 2007	Kitt Peak	Spacewatch	·	510 m	MPC · JPL
425558	2010 RK_{139}	—	October 18, 2003	Kitt Peak	Spacewatch	NYS	790 m	MPC · JPL
425559	2010 RS_{143}	—	October 1, 2000	Socorro	LINEAR	·	690 m	MPC · JPL
425560	2010 RJ_{149}	—	December 16, 2007	Mount Lemmon	Mount Lemmon Survey	V	570 m	MPC · JPL
425561	2010 RB_{152}	—	January 13, 2008	Kitt Peak	Spacewatch	MAS	720 m	MPC · JPL
425562	2010 RR_{153}	—	September 15, 2010	Kitt Peak	Spacewatch	·	640 m	MPC · JPL
425563	2010 RH_{165}	—	September 9, 2010	Kitt Peak	Spacewatch	·	740 m	MPC · JPL
425564	2010 RO_{167}	—	February 2, 2008	Kitt Peak	Spacewatch	NYS	1.1 km	MPC · JPL
425565	2010 RX_{171}	—	September 4, 2010	Kitt Peak	Spacewatch	·	1.2 km	MPC · JPL
425566	2010 RV_{179}	—	October 27, 2003	Kitt Peak	Spacewatch	·	850 m	MPC · JPL
425567	2010 SD_{9}	—	November 14, 2007	Mount Lemmon	Mount Lemmon Survey	·	700 m	MPC · JPL
425568	2010 SV_{13}	—	December 17, 2007	Mount Lemmon	Mount Lemmon Survey	·	580 m	MPC · JPL
425569	2010 SO_{19}	—	September 9, 2010	Kitt Peak	Spacewatch	·	750 m	MPC · JPL
425570	2010 SV_{34}	—	November 19, 2003	Kitt Peak	Spacewatch	·	1.0 km	MPC · JPL
425571	2010 SL_{35}	—	October 3, 1999	Kitt Peak	Spacewatch	·	1.1 km	MPC · JPL
425572	2010 TZ	—	April 29, 2006	Kitt Peak	Spacewatch	·	840 m	MPC · JPL
425573	2010 TX_{5}	—	September 16, 2010	Kitt Peak	Spacewatch	·	690 m	MPC · JPL
425574	2010 TK_{23}	—	January 16, 2004	Kitt Peak	Spacewatch	NYS	850 m	MPC · JPL
425575	2010 TT_{23}	—	September 17, 2010	Kitt Peak	Spacewatch	·	550 m	MPC · JPL
425576	2010 TT_{38}	—	October 18, 1999	Kitt Peak	Spacewatch	·	1.1 km	MPC · JPL
425577	2010 TL_{59}	—	November 9, 1996	Kitt Peak	Spacewatch	·	600 m	MPC · JPL
425578	2010 TV_{90}	—	September 21, 2003	Kitt Peak	Spacewatch	·	750 m	MPC · JPL
425579	2010 TP_{92}	—	September 18, 2010	Mount Lemmon	Mount Lemmon Survey	·	870 m	MPC · JPL
425580	2010 TK_{99}	—	September 16, 2010	Kitt Peak	Spacewatch	·	630 m	MPC · JPL
425581	2010 TB_{106}	—	November 19, 2003	Kitt Peak	Spacewatch	·	640 m	MPC · JPL
425582	2010 TZ_{107}	—	September 4, 2010	Kitt Peak	Spacewatch	·	950 m	MPC · JPL
425583	2010 TC_{114}	—	February 12, 2008	Kitt Peak	Spacewatch	MAS	580 m	MPC · JPL
425584	2010 TH_{116}	—	September 17, 2010	Mount Lemmon	Mount Lemmon Survey	·	520 m	MPC · JPL
425585	2010 TX_{128}	—	January 1, 2008	Kitt Peak	Spacewatch	·	430 m	MPC · JPL
425586	2010 TU_{141}	—	September 18, 2006	Kitt Peak	Spacewatch	V	740 m	MPC · JPL
425587	2010 TE_{143}	—	August 10, 2010	Kitt Peak	Spacewatch	·	680 m	MPC · JPL
425588	2010 TX_{143}	—	October 11, 2010	Mount Lemmon	Mount Lemmon Survey	·	560 m	MPC · JPL
425589	2010 TV_{163}	—	September 22, 1995	Kitt Peak	Spacewatch	NYS	1.1 km	MPC · JPL
425590	2010 TD_{168}	—	October 23, 2003	Kitt Peak	Spacewatch	·	650 m	MPC · JPL
425591	2010 TM_{169}	—	March 4, 2005	Catalina	CSS	·	730 m	MPC · JPL
425592	2010 TS_{170}	—	September 17, 2003	Kitt Peak	Spacewatch	·	580 m	MPC · JPL
425593	2010 TD_{171}	—	October 21, 2003	Kitt Peak	Spacewatch	V	540 m	MPC · JPL
425594	2010 TV_{176}	—	October 22, 2003	Socorro	LINEAR	·	1.0 km	MPC · JPL
425595	2010 TK_{180}	—	March 2, 2009	Mount Lemmon	Mount Lemmon Survey	·	720 m	MPC · JPL
425596	2010 UP_{9}	—	October 21, 2003	Kitt Peak	Spacewatch	NYS	700 m	MPC · JPL
425597	2010 UP_{13}	—	October 16, 2003	Kitt Peak	Spacewatch	·	750 m	MPC · JPL
425598	2010 UP_{17}	—	November 1, 1999	Kitt Peak	Spacewatch	MAS	630 m	MPC · JPL
425599	2010 UJ_{21}	—	May 7, 2005	Mount Lemmon	Mount Lemmon Survey	·	1.2 km	MPC · JPL
425600	2010 UD_{25}	—	September 18, 2010	Mount Lemmon	Mount Lemmon Survey	NYS	930 m	MPC · JPL

== 425601–425700 ==
back to top

Designation			Discovery			Properties		Ref
Permanent	Provisional	Named after	Date	Site	Discoverer(s)	Category	Diam.	Ref
425601	2010 UN_{25}	—	October 28, 2010	Kitt Peak	Spacewatch	MAR	1.4 km	MPC · JPL
425602	2010 UA_{45}	—	October 25, 2003	Kitt Peak	Spacewatch	·	730 m	MPC · JPL
425603	2010 UH_{48}	—	December 30, 2007	Kitt Peak	Spacewatch	·	670 m	MPC · JPL
425604	2010 UA_{54}	—	September 24, 2000	Socorro	LINEAR	·	740 m	MPC · JPL
425605	2010 UG_{54}	—	November 24, 2003	Anderson Mesa	LONEOS	·	730 m	MPC · JPL
425606	2010 UM_{70}	—	October 17, 1995	Kitt Peak	Spacewatch	ERI	1.6 km	MPC · JPL
425607	2010 UN_{70}	—	December 18, 2003	Socorro	LINEAR	·	920 m	MPC · JPL
425608	2010 UG_{75}	—	October 9, 2010	Catalina	CSS	PHO	900 m	MPC · JPL
425609	2010 UW_{91}	—	October 4, 2006	Mount Lemmon	Mount Lemmon Survey	·	1.3 km	MPC · JPL
425610	2010 UQ_{94}	—	November 20, 2007	Catalina	CSS	PHO	1.4 km	MPC · JPL
425611	2010 UW_{96}	—	November 12, 1999	Socorro	LINEAR	NYS	1.0 km	MPC · JPL
425612	2010 VA_{22}	—	September 19, 2006	Catalina	CSS	·	1.1 km	MPC · JPL
425613	2010 VO_{22}	—	November 27, 1995	Kitt Peak	Spacewatch	·	1.1 km	MPC · JPL
425614	2010 VW_{29}	—	January 11, 2008	Catalina	CSS	·	850 m	MPC · JPL
425615	2010 VX_{41}	—	December 18, 2003	Socorro	LINEAR	NYS	900 m	MPC · JPL
425616	2010 VF_{48}	—	October 14, 2010	Mount Lemmon	Mount Lemmon Survey	NYS	980 m	MPC · JPL
425617	2010 VL_{52}	—	September 11, 2010	Mount Lemmon	Mount Lemmon Survey	MAS	760 m	MPC · JPL
425618	2010 VK_{55}	—	December 19, 2003	Socorro	LINEAR	·	950 m	MPC · JPL
425619	2010 VV_{60}	—	September 20, 2003	Kitt Peak	Spacewatch	·	590 m	MPC · JPL
425620	2010 VA_{62}	—	March 6, 2008	Mount Lemmon	Mount Lemmon Survey	·	1.1 km	MPC · JPL
425621	2010 VH_{65}	—	October 30, 2010	Kitt Peak	Spacewatch	·	610 m	MPC · JPL
425622	2010 VG_{66}	—	January 16, 2004	Kitt Peak	Spacewatch	·	1.2 km	MPC · JPL
425623	2010 VN_{67}	—	April 19, 2009	Mount Lemmon	Mount Lemmon Survey	PHO	1.0 km	MPC · JPL
425624	2010 VL_{70}	—	September 11, 2010	Mount Lemmon	Mount Lemmon Survey	·	710 m	MPC · JPL
425625	2010 VR_{83}	—	October 10, 1999	Kitt Peak	Spacewatch	MAS	560 m	MPC · JPL
425626	2010 VP_{89}	—	August 18, 2006	Kitt Peak	Spacewatch	MAS	580 m	MPC · JPL
425627	2010 VH_{96}	—	November 17, 1999	Kitt Peak	Spacewatch	NYS	820 m	MPC · JPL
425628	2010 VP_{100}	—	November 5, 2010	Kitt Peak	Spacewatch	·	1.0 km	MPC · JPL
425629	2010 VL_{101}	—	September 5, 2010	Mount Lemmon	Mount Lemmon Survey	·	880 m	MPC · JPL
425630	2010 VO_{101}	—	September 17, 2006	Kitt Peak	Spacewatch	NYS	940 m	MPC · JPL
425631	2010 VZ_{123}	—	October 29, 2010	Mount Lemmon	Mount Lemmon Survey	·	750 m	MPC · JPL
425632	2010 VZ_{126}	—	October 18, 2006	Kitt Peak	Spacewatch	·	970 m	MPC · JPL
425633	2010 VW_{127}	—	January 11, 2008	Mount Lemmon	Mount Lemmon Survey	·	1.2 km	MPC · JPL
425634	2010 VJ_{133}	—	December 13, 2006	Kitt Peak	Spacewatch	·	1.2 km	MPC · JPL
425635	2010 VU_{138}	—	February 27, 2008	Mount Lemmon	Mount Lemmon Survey	NYS	980 m	MPC · JPL
425636	2010 VH_{140}	—	October 13, 2010	Catalina	CSS	·	1.1 km	MPC · JPL
425637	2010 VJ_{144}	—	August 29, 2006	Kitt Peak	Spacewatch	V	660 m	MPC · JPL
425638	2010 VU_{159}	—	February 8, 2008	Mount Lemmon	Mount Lemmon Survey	·	780 m	MPC · JPL
425639	2010 VU_{164}	—	April 11, 2005	Kitt Peak	Spacewatch	V	700 m	MPC · JPL
425640	2010 VR_{170}	—	November 19, 2006	Kitt Peak	Spacewatch	·	1.5 km	MPC · JPL
425641	2010 VX_{174}	—	November 11, 2010	Kitt Peak	Spacewatch	·	1.2 km	MPC · JPL
425642	2010 VJ_{175}	—	September 5, 1999	Kitt Peak	Spacewatch	·	820 m	MPC · JPL
425643	2010 VS_{184}	—	December 19, 2003	Kitt Peak	Spacewatch	·	1.1 km	MPC · JPL
425644	2010 VD_{185}	—	December 1, 2003	Kitt Peak	Spacewatch	(2076)	640 m	MPC · JPL
425645	2010 VF_{192}	—	September 20, 2006	Kitt Peak	Spacewatch	·	920 m	MPC · JPL
425646	2010 VJ_{196}	—	October 30, 2010	Mount Lemmon	Mount Lemmon Survey	·	890 m	MPC · JPL
425647	2010 VP_{199}	—	August 28, 2006	Anderson Mesa	LONEOS	·	1.4 km	MPC · JPL
425648	2010 VL_{206}	—	January 30, 2012	Kitt Peak	Spacewatch	V	600 m	MPC · JPL
425649	2010 VE_{209}	—	October 13, 2010	Mount Lemmon	Mount Lemmon Survey	·	830 m	MPC · JPL
425650	2010 VY_{209}	—	October 18, 2003	Kitt Peak	Spacewatch	·	750 m	MPC · JPL
425651	2010 WO_{10}	—	December 31, 2007	Kitt Peak	Spacewatch	·	650 m	MPC · JPL
425652	2010 WG_{16}	—	November 12, 2010	Mount Lemmon	Mount Lemmon Survey	KON	2.1 km	MPC · JPL
425653	2010 WB_{54}	—	February 14, 2004	Kitt Peak	Spacewatch	·	970 m	MPC · JPL
425654	2010 WV_{56}	—	November 13, 2006	Catalina	CSS	·	1.4 km	MPC · JPL
425655	2010 WW_{66}	—	November 16, 1999	Kitt Peak	Spacewatch	NYS	940 m	MPC · JPL
425656	2010 XU_{1}	—	September 27, 2006	Kitt Peak	Spacewatch	V	570 m	MPC · JPL
425657	2010 XG_{4}	—	November 9, 2009	Kitt Peak	Spacewatch	MAR	1.4 km	MPC · JPL
425658	2010 XW_{4}	—	November 18, 2006	Kitt Peak	Spacewatch	·	1.5 km	MPC · JPL
425659	2010 XC_{12}	—	November 10, 2010	Mount Lemmon	Mount Lemmon Survey	·	1.8 km	MPC · JPL
425660	2010 XD_{12}	—	November 15, 2010	Mount Lemmon	Mount Lemmon Survey	·	1.2 km	MPC · JPL
425661	2010 XA_{17}	—	December 2, 2010	Kitt Peak	Spacewatch	·	1.9 km	MPC · JPL
425662	2010 XG_{18}	—	October 25, 2003	Kitt Peak	Spacewatch	·	860 m	MPC · JPL
425663	2010 XX_{18}	—	December 4, 2010	Mount Lemmon	Mount Lemmon Survey	·	1.1 km	MPC · JPL
425664	2010 XA_{37}	—	November 17, 2006	Kitt Peak	Spacewatch	·	1.1 km	MPC · JPL
425665	2010 XT_{49}	—	October 22, 2003	Kitt Peak	Spacewatch	·	710 m	MPC · JPL
425666	2010 XS_{61}	—	November 14, 2010	Kitt Peak	Spacewatch	V	670 m	MPC · JPL
425667	2010 XQ_{63}	—	October 23, 2006	Mount Lemmon	Mount Lemmon Survey	·	1.2 km	MPC · JPL
425668	2010 XY_{65}	—	October 17, 2006	Kitt Peak	Spacewatch	·	940 m	MPC · JPL
425669	2010 XV_{66}	—	July 21, 2006	Mount Lemmon	Mount Lemmon Survey	NYS	1.1 km	MPC · JPL
425670	2010 XP_{67}	—	April 5, 2008	Mount Lemmon	Mount Lemmon Survey	·	1 km	MPC · JPL
425671	2010 XX_{79}	—	November 7, 2010	Catalina	CSS	·	3.9 km	MPC · JPL
425672	2010 XA_{80}	—	September 26, 2006	Catalina	CSS	·	1.0 km	MPC · JPL
425673	2010 XN_{88}	—	December 5, 2007	Kitt Peak	Spacewatch	PHO	1.2 km	MPC · JPL
425674	2010 YR_{3}	—	January 29, 2004	Socorro	LINEAR	PHO	1.5 km	MPC · JPL
425675	2010 YJ_{4}	—	October 16, 2009	Mount Lemmon	Mount Lemmon Survey	·	1.2 km	MPC · JPL
425676	2011 AC_{2}	—	April 28, 2004	Kitt Peak	Spacewatch	·	1.1 km	MPC · JPL
425677	2011 AQ_{5}	—	December 8, 2010	Mount Lemmon	Mount Lemmon Survey	·	1.6 km	MPC · JPL
425678	2011 AG_{19}	—	December 25, 2010	Mount Lemmon	Mount Lemmon Survey	·	1.2 km	MPC · JPL
425679	2011 AH_{21}	—	January 28, 2007	Kitt Peak	Spacewatch	·	1.1 km	MPC · JPL
425680	2011 AL_{21}	—	December 4, 2005	Kitt Peak	Spacewatch	·	2.1 km	MPC · JPL
425681	2011 AV_{21}	—	January 5, 2000	Kitt Peak	Spacewatch	·	1.6 km	MPC · JPL
425682	2011 AA_{30}	—	April 9, 2004	Siding Spring	SSS	MAS	850 m	MPC · JPL
425683	2011 AW_{30}	—	March 14, 2007	Mount Lemmon	Mount Lemmon Survey	·	1.4 km	MPC · JPL
425684	2011 AK_{46}	—	December 15, 2006	Kitt Peak	Spacewatch	V	730 m	MPC · JPL
425685	2011 AJ_{48}	—	December 14, 2006	Mount Lemmon	Mount Lemmon Survey	·	2.3 km	MPC · JPL
425686	2011 AU_{51}	—	May 7, 2008	Mount Lemmon	Mount Lemmon Survey	·	1.3 km	MPC · JPL
425687	2011 AQ_{53}	—	November 22, 2006	Mount Lemmon	Mount Lemmon Survey	·	1.1 km	MPC · JPL
425688	2011 AV_{56}	—	December 9, 2010	Mount Lemmon	Mount Lemmon Survey	·	1.0 km	MPC · JPL
425689	2011 AK_{57}	—	September 17, 2009	Catalina	CSS	·	1.4 km	MPC · JPL
425690	2011 AG_{59}	—	December 13, 2006	Mount Lemmon	Mount Lemmon Survey	·	1.1 km	MPC · JPL
425691	2011 AO_{59}	—	January 12, 2011	Mount Lemmon	Mount Lemmon Survey	·	1.8 km	MPC · JPL
425692	2011 AL_{62}	—	May 29, 2008	Mount Lemmon	Mount Lemmon Survey	·	1.7 km	MPC · JPL
425693	2011 AL_{65}	—	January 17, 2007	Kitt Peak	Spacewatch	·	1.2 km	MPC · JPL
425694	2011 AZ_{66}	—	December 14, 2010	Mount Lemmon	Mount Lemmon Survey	·	1.4 km	MPC · JPL
425695	2011 AY_{72}	—	December 3, 2010	Catalina	CSS	·	1.5 km	MPC · JPL
425696	2011 AZ_{72}	—	November 24, 2006	Mount Lemmon	Mount Lemmon Survey	·	2.3 km	MPC · JPL
425697	2011 AD_{74}	—	December 6, 2010	Mount Lemmon	Mount Lemmon Survey	·	2.8 km	MPC · JPL
425698	2011 AG_{75}	—	January 11, 2011	Catalina	CSS	·	1.3 km	MPC · JPL
425699	2011 AQ_{75}	—	January 11, 2011	Kitt Peak	Spacewatch	·	1.3 km	MPC · JPL
425700	2011 AT_{77}	—	March 9, 2007	Catalina	CSS	JUN	1.1 km	MPC · JPL

== 425701–425800 ==
back to top

Designation			Discovery			Properties		Ref
Permanent	Provisional	Named after	Date	Site	Discoverer(s)	Category	Diam.	Ref
425701	2011 BK_{5}	—	January 24, 2007	Mount Lemmon	Mount Lemmon Survey	·	980 m	MPC · JPL
425702	2011 BF_{6}	—	December 5, 2010	Mount Lemmon	Mount Lemmon Survey	·	1.7 km	MPC · JPL
425703	2011 BW_{7}	—	May 3, 2008	Kitt Peak	Spacewatch	·	1.4 km	MPC · JPL
425704	2011 BT_{8}	—	January 16, 2011	Mount Lemmon	Mount Lemmon Survey	·	1.9 km	MPC · JPL
425705	2011 BM_{9}	—	November 5, 2010	Mount Lemmon	Mount Lemmon Survey	MAS	850 m	MPC · JPL
425706	2011 BO_{10}	—	March 14, 2007	Catalina	CSS	·	1.4 km	MPC · JPL
425707	2011 BR_{10}	—	December 13, 2006	Mount Lemmon	Mount Lemmon Survey	·	1.1 km	MPC · JPL
425708	2011 BO_{14}	—	December 8, 2010	Mount Lemmon	Mount Lemmon Survey	MAR	1.6 km	MPC · JPL
425709	2011 BR_{19}	—	March 14, 2007	Anderson Mesa	LONEOS	RAF	1.3 km	MPC · JPL
425710	2011 BN_{20}	—	January 23, 2011	Mount Lemmon	Mount Lemmon Survey	·	900 m	MPC · JPL
425711	2011 BZ_{22}	—	February 19, 2007	Siding Spring	SSS	·	2.1 km	MPC · JPL
425712	2011 BS_{23}	—	January 26, 1998	Kitt Peak	Spacewatch	·	1.8 km	MPC · JPL
425713	2011 BK_{24}	—	January 28, 2011	Catalina	CSS	AMO	430 m	MPC · JPL
425714	2011 BH_{27}	—	January 25, 2011	Kitt Peak	Spacewatch	NYS	1.3 km	MPC · JPL
425715	2011 BJ_{27}	—	October 14, 2001	Socorro	LINEAR	·	1.1 km	MPC · JPL
425716	2011 BX_{28}	—	July 30, 2009	Catalina	CSS	·	1.7 km	MPC · JPL
425717	2011 BS_{29}	—	November 16, 2010	Mount Lemmon	Mount Lemmon Survey	GEF	1.2 km	MPC · JPL
425718	2011 BT_{30}	—	February 10, 2002	Socorro	LINEAR	·	2.2 km	MPC · JPL
425719	2011 BD_{31}	—	May 4, 2008	Kitt Peak	Spacewatch	·	930 m	MPC · JPL
425720	2011 BV_{32}	—	August 28, 2009	Kitt Peak	Spacewatch	·	1.0 km	MPC · JPL
425721	2011 BQ_{35}	—	January 27, 2007	Kitt Peak	Spacewatch	·	910 m	MPC · JPL
425722	2011 BX_{37}	—	January 28, 2011	Mount Lemmon	Mount Lemmon Survey	·	2.5 km	MPC · JPL
425723	2011 BK_{43}	—	July 28, 2008	Mount Lemmon	Mount Lemmon Survey	EUN	1.4 km	MPC · JPL
425724	2011 BJ_{45}	—	January 26, 2010	WISE	WISE	·	2.2 km	MPC · JPL
425725	2011 BH_{51}	—	December 1, 2006	Mount Lemmon	Mount Lemmon Survey	·	1.4 km	MPC · JPL
425726	2011 BQ_{51}	—	September 21, 2009	Catalina	CSS	·	1.6 km	MPC · JPL
425727	2011 BL_{76}	—	July 30, 2008	Mount Lemmon	Mount Lemmon Survey	·	1.7 km	MPC · JPL
425728	2011 BN_{76}	—	September 16, 2004	Kitt Peak	Spacewatch	(5)	1.2 km	MPC · JPL
425729	2011 BB_{79}	—	March 15, 2004	Socorro	LINEAR	·	970 m	MPC · JPL
425730	2011 BE_{79}	—	December 23, 2006	Mount Lemmon	Mount Lemmon Survey	·	740 m	MPC · JPL
425731	2011 BJ_{80}	—	March 14, 2007	Catalina	CSS	·	2.3 km	MPC · JPL
425732	2011 BW_{81}	—	January 28, 2011	Mount Lemmon	Mount Lemmon Survey	·	1.2 km	MPC · JPL
425733	2011 BJ_{82}	—	October 1, 2005	Mount Lemmon	Mount Lemmon Survey	·	1.4 km	MPC · JPL
425734	2011 BM_{82}	—	June 11, 2004	Kitt Peak	Spacewatch	·	1.5 km	MPC · JPL
425735	2011 BP_{82}	—	March 3, 2000	Socorro	LINEAR	·	1.3 km	MPC · JPL
425736	2011 BU_{83}	—	July 11, 2004	Socorro	LINEAR	·	1.6 km	MPC · JPL
425737	2011 BU_{88}	—	April 19, 2004	Socorro	LINEAR	·	1.7 km	MPC · JPL
425738	2011 BQ_{90}	—	October 9, 2005	Kitt Peak	Spacewatch	·	1.1 km	MPC · JPL
425739	2011 BB_{95}	—	January 10, 2011	Mount Lemmon	Mount Lemmon Survey	·	1.3 km	MPC · JPL
425740	2011 BZ_{96}	—	December 30, 2005	Mount Lemmon	Mount Lemmon Survey	·	2.2 km	MPC · JPL
425741	2011 BB_{97}	—	October 30, 2005	Kitt Peak	Spacewatch	·	1.2 km	MPC · JPL
425742	2011 BG_{101}	—	February 17, 2007	Kitt Peak	Spacewatch	·	880 m	MPC · JPL
425743	2011 BH_{101}	—	January 11, 2011	Kitt Peak	Spacewatch	MAS	740 m	MPC · JPL
425744	2011 BL_{101}	—	March 26, 2003	Kitt Peak	Spacewatch	·	1.5 km	MPC · JPL
425745	2011 BW_{102}	—	December 21, 2006	Mount Lemmon	Mount Lemmon Survey	·	830 m	MPC · JPL
425746	2011 BH_{103}	—	November 22, 2005	Kitt Peak	Spacewatch	MRX	970 m	MPC · JPL
425747	2011 BL_{106}	—	January 28, 2007	Mount Lemmon	Mount Lemmon Survey	·	760 m	MPC · JPL
425748	2011 BH_{109}	—	October 25, 2009	Kitt Peak	Spacewatch	·	1.2 km	MPC · JPL
425749	2011 BZ_{116}	—	November 15, 2010	Mount Lemmon	Mount Lemmon Survey	·	1.1 km	MPC · JPL
425750	2011 BO_{118}	—	September 13, 2005	Kitt Peak	Spacewatch	·	1.1 km	MPC · JPL
425751	2011 BW_{154}	—	October 6, 2004	Kitt Peak	Spacewatch	KOR	1.1 km	MPC · JPL
425752	2011 BY_{160}	—	November 18, 1998	Kitt Peak	Spacewatch	NYS	1.1 km	MPC · JPL
425753	2011 BR_{161}	—	December 1, 1996	Kitt Peak	Spacewatch	·	2.0 km	MPC · JPL
425754	2011 CP	—	March 13, 2007	Catalina	CSS	·	2.1 km	MPC · JPL
425755	2011 CP_{4}	—	February 2, 2011	Haleakala	Pan-STARRS 1	ATE · PHA	210 m	MPC · JPL
425756	2011 CQ_{5}	—	November 22, 2006	Kitt Peak	Spacewatch	NYS	1.1 km	MPC · JPL
425757	2011 CF_{13}	—	November 25, 2006	Mount Lemmon	Mount Lemmon Survey	·	960 m	MPC · JPL
425758	2011 CU_{13}	—	December 19, 2001	Kitt Peak	Spacewatch	·	2.0 km	MPC · JPL
425759	2011 CV_{14}	—	September 14, 2005	Kitt Peak	Spacewatch	·	870 m	MPC · JPL
425760	2011 CM_{17}	—	December 13, 2006	Kitt Peak	Spacewatch	NYS	1.1 km	MPC · JPL
425761	2011 CB_{18}	—	March 16, 2007	Kitt Peak	Spacewatch	·	1.5 km	MPC · JPL
425762	2011 CS_{18}	—	March 19, 2007	Anderson Mesa	LONEOS	·	2.1 km	MPC · JPL
425763	2011 CU_{18}	—	December 9, 2010	Mount Lemmon	Mount Lemmon Survey	·	1.1 km	MPC · JPL
425764	2011 CD_{20}	—	February 6, 2007	Kitt Peak	Spacewatch	·	880 m	MPC · JPL
425765	2011 CM_{22}	—	January 10, 2007	Mount Lemmon	Mount Lemmon Survey	·	1.1 km	MPC · JPL
425766	2011 CT_{24}	—	January 28, 2011	Catalina	CSS	·	1.4 km	MPC · JPL
425767	2011 CD_{26}	—	January 30, 2000	Kitt Peak	Spacewatch	·	1.1 km	MPC · JPL
425768	2011 CJ_{26}	—	September 16, 2009	Kitt Peak	Spacewatch	·	1.8 km	MPC · JPL
425769	2011 CC_{30}	—	May 14, 2004	Kitt Peak	Spacewatch	·	1.4 km	MPC · JPL
425770	2011 CQ_{31}	—	February 21, 2007	Mount Lemmon	Mount Lemmon Survey	KON	1.7 km	MPC · JPL
425771	2011 CB_{32}	—	January 25, 2011	Kitt Peak	Spacewatch	·	1.4 km	MPC · JPL
425772	2011 CY_{36}	—	February 7, 2007	Mount Lemmon	Mount Lemmon Survey	·	1.1 km	MPC · JPL
425773	2011 CJ_{38}	—	December 14, 2006	Kitt Peak	Spacewatch	·	1.5 km	MPC · JPL
425774	2011 CD_{40}	—	January 26, 2011	Mount Lemmon	Mount Lemmon Survey	·	3.0 km	MPC · JPL
425775	2011 CO_{40}	—	July 3, 2003	Kitt Peak	Spacewatch	·	2.0 km	MPC · JPL
425776	2011 CP_{41}	—	November 1, 2010	Mount Lemmon	Mount Lemmon Survey	·	2.1 km	MPC · JPL
425777	2011 CL_{47}	—	February 21, 2007	Mount Lemmon	Mount Lemmon Survey	·	1.2 km	MPC · JPL
425778	2011 CP_{51}	—	September 18, 2004	Socorro	LINEAR	EUN	1.5 km	MPC · JPL
425779	2011 CY_{55}	—	August 18, 2009	Kitt Peak	Spacewatch	·	1.5 km	MPC · JPL
425780	2011 CC_{56}	—	October 3, 2005	Kitt Peak	Spacewatch	·	1.0 km	MPC · JPL
425781	2011 CM_{58}	—	September 27, 2009	Mount Lemmon	Mount Lemmon Survey	·	1.8 km	MPC · JPL
425782	2011 CL_{68}	—	December 10, 2006	Kitt Peak	Spacewatch	V	630 m	MPC · JPL
425783	2011 CC_{71}	—	March 13, 2007	Kitt Peak	Spacewatch	·	1.0 km	MPC · JPL
425784	2011 CP_{71}	—	January 21, 2010	WISE	WISE	·	2.4 km	MPC · JPL
425785	2011 CM_{72}	—	January 11, 2011	Mount Lemmon	Mount Lemmon Survey	·	2.1 km	MPC · JPL
425786	2011 CW_{74}	—	December 12, 2010	Mount Lemmon	Mount Lemmon Survey	NYS	1.3 km	MPC · JPL
425787	2011 CD_{76}	—	January 17, 2007	Catalina	CSS	·	1.2 km	MPC · JPL
425788	2011 CO_{78}	—	February 21, 2007	Mount Lemmon	Mount Lemmon Survey	(5)	880 m	MPC · JPL
425789	2011 CL_{79}	—	April 16, 2007	Siding Spring	SSS	·	2.2 km	MPC · JPL
425790	2011 CU_{79}	—	November 13, 2010	Mount Lemmon	Mount Lemmon Survey	EUN	1.5 km	MPC · JPL
425791	2011 CM_{87}	—	December 11, 2009	Mount Lemmon	Mount Lemmon Survey	·	2.4 km	MPC · JPL
425792	2011 CC_{91}	—	December 6, 2005	Kitt Peak	Spacewatch	·	1.1 km	MPC · JPL
425793	2011 CV_{91}	—	January 10, 2007	Mount Lemmon	Mount Lemmon Survey	·	1.1 km	MPC · JPL
425794	2011 CZ_{92}	—	April 23, 2004	Kitt Peak	Spacewatch	·	1.0 km	MPC · JPL
425795	2011 CZ_{95}	—	October 22, 2005	Kitt Peak	Spacewatch	(5)	840 m	MPC · JPL
425796	2011 CC_{103}	—	February 11, 2002	Socorro	LINEAR	·	1.5 km	MPC · JPL
425797	2011 CT_{103}	—	December 30, 2005	Kitt Peak	Spacewatch	·	1.7 km	MPC · JPL
425798	2011 CC_{104}	—	October 4, 2004	Kitt Peak	Spacewatch	·	1.6 km	MPC · JPL
425799	2011 CH_{107}	—	November 22, 2005	Kitt Peak	Spacewatch	·	1.2 km	MPC · JPL
425800	2011 CC_{109}	—	September 5, 2008	Kitt Peak	Spacewatch	ADE	1.7 km	MPC · JPL

== 425801–425900 ==
back to top

Designation			Discovery			Properties		Ref
Permanent	Provisional	Named after	Date	Site	Discoverer(s)	Category	Diam.	Ref
425801	2011 CO_{112}	—	December 11, 2009	Mount Lemmon	Mount Lemmon Survey	·	1.6 km	MPC · JPL
425802	2011 CF_{117}	—	November 25, 2009	Kitt Peak	Spacewatch	·	2.6 km	MPC · JPL
425803	2011 CY_{117}	—	September 24, 2005	Kitt Peak	Spacewatch	V	860 m	MPC · JPL
425804	2011 DM_{5}	—	February 12, 2002	Kitt Peak	Spacewatch	·	2.0 km	MPC · JPL
425805	2011 DH_{8}	—	March 20, 2007	Kitt Peak	Spacewatch	·	1.3 km	MPC · JPL
425806	2011 DW_{8}	—	April 15, 2007	Kitt Peak	Spacewatch	·	1.2 km	MPC · JPL
425807	2011 DD_{10}	—	November 11, 2009	Kitt Peak	Spacewatch	·	1.4 km	MPC · JPL
425808	2011 DE_{11}	—	March 15, 2007	Kitt Peak	Spacewatch	·	1.3 km	MPC · JPL
425809	2011 DK_{13}	—	November 25, 2005	Kitt Peak	Spacewatch	·	1.3 km	MPC · JPL
425810	2011 DO_{13}	—	February 17, 2007	Kitt Peak	Spacewatch	(5)	930 m	MPC · JPL
425811	2011 DL_{15}	—	August 7, 2004	Campo Imperatore	CINEOS	·	1.1 km	MPC · JPL
425812	2011 DX_{15}	—	September 15, 2004	Kitt Peak	Spacewatch	·	1.8 km	MPC · JPL
425813	2011 DD_{18}	—	April 20, 2007	Kitt Peak	Spacewatch	·	1.2 km	MPC · JPL
425814	2011 DV_{19}	—	January 28, 2011	Mount Lemmon	Mount Lemmon Survey	NYS	1.0 km	MPC · JPL
425815	2011 DK_{23}	—	April 20, 2007	Mount Lemmon	Mount Lemmon Survey	·	1.4 km	MPC · JPL
425816	2011 DD_{24}	—	February 26, 2011	Kitt Peak	Spacewatch	·	1.5 km	MPC · JPL
425817	2011 DC_{25}	—	February 6, 2007	Kitt Peak	Spacewatch	·	1.3 km	MPC · JPL
425818	2011 DV_{28}	—	September 27, 2009	Kitt Peak	Spacewatch	·	1.3 km	MPC · JPL
425819	2011 DV_{39}	—	March 14, 2007	Kitt Peak	Spacewatch	·	1.6 km	MPC · JPL
425820	2011 DL_{41}	—	April 22, 2007	Kitt Peak	Spacewatch	MIS	1.9 km	MPC · JPL
425821	2011 DO_{48}	—	January 26, 2007	Kitt Peak	Spacewatch	MAS	900 m	MPC · JPL
425822	2011 EP_{4}	—	May 9, 2007	Mount Lemmon	Mount Lemmon Survey	MIS	2.6 km	MPC · JPL
425823	2011 EO_{8}	—	September 30, 2005	Kitt Peak	Spacewatch	·	1.1 km	MPC · JPL
425824	2011 ES_{10}	—	May 10, 2003	Kitt Peak	Spacewatch	·	1.4 km	MPC · JPL
425825	2011 EP_{12}	—	September 23, 2004	Kitt Peak	Spacewatch	·	2.1 km	MPC · JPL
425826	2011 ET_{13}	—	February 9, 2011	Mount Lemmon	Mount Lemmon Survey	·	1.8 km	MPC · JPL
425827	2011 EA_{15}	—	January 27, 2007	Mount Lemmon	Mount Lemmon Survey	NYS	1.3 km	MPC · JPL
425828	2011 EA_{16}	—	December 5, 2010	Mount Lemmon	Mount Lemmon Survey	(5)	1.2 km	MPC · JPL
425829	2011 ER_{16}	—	February 23, 2011	Kitt Peak	Spacewatch	GEF	1.2 km	MPC · JPL
425830	2011 ET_{18}	—	February 20, 2002	Socorro	LINEAR	·	2.4 km	MPC · JPL
425831	2011 EA_{20}	—	January 17, 2007	Kitt Peak	Spacewatch	·	980 m	MPC · JPL
425832	2011 EA_{23}	—	July 29, 2008	Kitt Peak	Spacewatch	ADE	2.0 km	MPC · JPL
425833	2011 EF_{23}	—	March 14, 2007	Kitt Peak	Spacewatch	·	2.5 km	MPC · JPL
425834	2011 EH_{24}	—	January 9, 2002	Socorro	LINEAR	·	1.5 km	MPC · JPL
425835	2011 EV_{26}	—	December 21, 2006	Mount Lemmon	Mount Lemmon Survey	·	1.4 km	MPC · JPL
425836	2011 EP_{27}	—	March 15, 2007	Kitt Peak	Spacewatch	·	930 m	MPC · JPL
425837	2011 EY_{36}	—	September 25, 2008	Kitt Peak	Spacewatch	·	1.7 km	MPC · JPL
425838	2011 EQ_{37}	—	March 18, 2007	Kitt Peak	Spacewatch	·	1.6 km	MPC · JPL
425839	2011 ED_{38}	—	April 15, 2007	Catalina	CSS	(5)	1.6 km	MPC · JPL
425840	2011 EO_{39}	—	January 20, 2006	Kitt Peak	Spacewatch	·	1.7 km	MPC · JPL
425841	2011 EQ_{41}	—	October 22, 2009	Mount Lemmon	Mount Lemmon Survey	·	1.8 km	MPC · JPL
425842	2011 EP_{43}	—	February 26, 2007	Mount Lemmon	Mount Lemmon Survey	·	1.2 km	MPC · JPL
425843	2011 EK_{50}	—	February 10, 2011	Catalina	CSS	·	1.7 km	MPC · JPL
425844	2011 EP_{53}	—	March 9, 2011	Kitt Peak	Spacewatch	·	2.0 km	MPC · JPL
425845	2011 EX_{53}	—	March 16, 2007	Kitt Peak	Spacewatch	·	1.1 km	MPC · JPL
425846	2011 EM_{54}	—	March 10, 2011	Kitt Peak	Spacewatch	·	2.1 km	MPC · JPL
425847	2011 EV_{54}	—	February 10, 2002	Socorro	LINEAR	EUN	1.4 km	MPC · JPL
425848	2011 EG_{58}	—	May 5, 2006	Kitt Peak	Spacewatch	·	2.3 km	MPC · JPL
425849	2011 EH_{59}	—	May 22, 2003	Kitt Peak	Spacewatch	(5)	1.1 km	MPC · JPL
425850	2011 ET_{62}	—	April 15, 2007	Catalina	CSS	·	1.7 km	MPC · JPL
425851	2011 ER_{68}	—	April 26, 2000	Kitt Peak	Spacewatch	NYS	1.3 km	MPC · JPL
425852	2011 EY_{68}	—	April 10, 2003	Kitt Peak	Spacewatch	·	1.2 km	MPC · JPL
425853	2011 EV_{70}	—	March 6, 2011	Kitt Peak	Spacewatch	·	2.8 km	MPC · JPL
425854	2011 EV_{71}	—	November 10, 2009	Kitt Peak	Spacewatch	·	1.8 km	MPC · JPL
425855	2011 EY_{71}	—	October 2, 2008	Mount Lemmon	Mount Lemmon Survey	·	2.1 km	MPC · JPL
425856	2011 EL_{72}	—	March 11, 2011	Kitt Peak	Spacewatch	·	1.9 km	MPC · JPL
425857	2011 EH_{75}	—	April 9, 1996	Kitt Peak	Spacewatch	·	2.2 km	MPC · JPL
425858	2011 EU_{75}	—	March 11, 2007	Kitt Peak	Spacewatch	(5)	930 m	MPC · JPL
425859	2011 EG_{80}	—	October 27, 2005	Mount Lemmon	Mount Lemmon Survey	(5)	1.3 km	MPC · JPL
425860	2011 EZ_{82}	—	April 30, 2003	Kitt Peak	Spacewatch	·	1.5 km	MPC · JPL
425861	2011 EB_{83}	—	September 18, 2009	Catalina	CSS	MAR	1.1 km	MPC · JPL
425862	2011 EQ_{84}	—	March 9, 2011	Kitt Peak	Spacewatch	·	2.0 km	MPC · JPL
425863	2011 EN_{86}	—	April 22, 2007	Mount Lemmon	Mount Lemmon Survey	GEF	1.2 km	MPC · JPL
425864	2011 FM_{2}	—	March 25, 2011	Kitt Peak	Spacewatch	·	1.5 km	MPC · JPL
425865	2011 FX_{3}	—	April 24, 2007	Mount Lemmon	Mount Lemmon Survey	·	1.8 km	MPC · JPL
425866	2011 FF_{4}	—	March 16, 2007	Mount Lemmon	Mount Lemmon Survey	·	1.6 km	MPC · JPL
425867	2011 FW_{6}	—	January 8, 2011	Mount Lemmon	Mount Lemmon Survey	·	2.4 km	MPC · JPL
425868	2011 FW_{7}	—	September 22, 2008	Mount Lemmon	Mount Lemmon Survey	·	1.9 km	MPC · JPL
425869	2011 FL_{10}	—	March 12, 2002	Kitt Peak	Spacewatch	·	1.9 km	MPC · JPL
425870	2011 FE_{11}	—	December 6, 2005	Kitt Peak	Spacewatch	·	1.2 km	MPC · JPL
425871	2011 FQ_{11}	—	March 25, 2011	Kitt Peak	Spacewatch	·	2.0 km	MPC · JPL
425872	2011 FH_{12}	—	January 26, 2006	Mount Lemmon	Mount Lemmon Survey	·	1.8 km	MPC · JPL
425873	2011 FS_{16}	—	August 10, 2007	Kitt Peak	Spacewatch	·	3.3 km	MPC · JPL
425874	2011 FM_{18}	—	March 25, 2011	Kitt Peak	Spacewatch	·	2.7 km	MPC · JPL
425875	2011 FW_{18}	—	March 27, 2011	Kitt Peak	Spacewatch	·	2.3 km	MPC · JPL
425876	2011 FH_{19}	—	April 2, 2005	Mount Lemmon	Mount Lemmon Survey	·	2.4 km	MPC · JPL
425877	2011 FP_{19}	—	March 2, 2011	Kitt Peak	Spacewatch	·	2.4 km	MPC · JPL
425878	2011 FP_{22}	—	February 2, 2006	Kitt Peak	Spacewatch	NEM	2.2 km	MPC · JPL
425879	2011 FB_{24}	—	December 29, 2005	Mount Lemmon	Mount Lemmon Survey	·	1.5 km	MPC · JPL
425880	2011 FE_{25}	—	January 11, 2011	Kitt Peak	Spacewatch	·	2.4 km	MPC · JPL
425881	2011 FT_{26}	—	December 3, 2008	Mount Lemmon	Mount Lemmon Survey	CYB	3.8 km	MPC · JPL
425882	2011 FL_{30}	—	December 4, 2005	Kitt Peak	Spacewatch	·	1.5 km	MPC · JPL
425883	2011 FZ_{32}	—	January 22, 2002	Kitt Peak	Spacewatch	·	1.2 km	MPC · JPL
425884	2011 FU_{33}	—	September 22, 2008	Kitt Peak	Spacewatch	·	3.0 km	MPC · JPL
425885	2011 FA_{34}	—	May 13, 2007	Kitt Peak	Spacewatch	·	1.4 km	MPC · JPL
425886	2011 FV_{35}	—	March 10, 2011	Kitt Peak	Spacewatch	·	1.7 km	MPC · JPL
425887	2011 FJ_{36}	—	March 5, 2011	Kitt Peak	Spacewatch	·	2.3 km	MPC · JPL
425888	2011 FH_{41}	—	December 25, 2005	Kitt Peak	Spacewatch	·	2.0 km	MPC · JPL
425889	2011 FC_{48}	—	March 29, 2011	Kitt Peak	Spacewatch	·	1.4 km	MPC · JPL
425890	2011 FO_{48}	—	March 29, 2011	Kitt Peak	Spacewatch	EOS	2.3 km	MPC · JPL
425891	2011 FP_{48}	—	May 15, 2010	WISE	WISE	·	3.4 km	MPC · JPL
425892	2011 FO_{51}	—	March 14, 2007	Catalina	CSS	·	1.9 km	MPC · JPL
425893	2011 FQ_{57}	—	March 30, 2011	Mount Lemmon	Mount Lemmon Survey	·	2.0 km	MPC · JPL
425894	2011 FP_{59}	—	January 23, 2006	Mount Lemmon	Mount Lemmon Survey	·	1.4 km	MPC · JPL
425895	2011 FT_{59}	—	March 15, 2002	Kitt Peak	Spacewatch	·	1.5 km	MPC · JPL
425896	2011 FV_{63}	—	March 25, 2011	Kitt Peak	Spacewatch	·	1.7 km	MPC · JPL
425897	2011 FG_{70}	—	December 11, 2010	Kitt Peak	Spacewatch	(5)	1.4 km	MPC · JPL
425898	2011 FP_{79}	—	February 4, 2006	Mount Lemmon	Mount Lemmon Survey	·	2.0 km	MPC · JPL
425899	2011 FJ_{84}	—	February 27, 2010	WISE	WISE	DOR	2.8 km	MPC · JPL
425900	2011 FA_{88}	—	October 22, 2009	Mount Lemmon	Mount Lemmon Survey	·	2.1 km	MPC · JPL

== 425901–426000 ==
back to top

Designation			Discovery			Properties		Ref
Permanent	Provisional	Named after	Date	Site	Discoverer(s)	Category	Diam.	Ref
425901	2011 FB_{88}	—	March 25, 2007	Mount Lemmon	Mount Lemmon Survey	·	2.1 km	MPC · JPL
425902	2011 FO_{88}	—	September 23, 2008	Kitt Peak	Spacewatch	ADE	2.1 km	MPC · JPL
425903	2011 FE_{101}	—	January 31, 2006	Kitt Peak	Spacewatch	MRX	1.0 km	MPC · JPL
425904	2011 FL_{104}	—	March 14, 2010	WISE	WISE	VER	3.5 km	MPC · JPL
425905	2011 FB_{115}	—	September 22, 2003	Anderson Mesa	LONEOS	DOR	2.8 km	MPC · JPL
425906	2011 FY_{120}	—	March 14, 2011	Mount Lemmon	Mount Lemmon Survey	·	2.4 km	MPC · JPL
425907	2011 FB_{125}	—	November 25, 2005	Kitt Peak	Spacewatch	·	1.5 km	MPC · JPL
425908	2011 FM_{126}	—	April 28, 2003	Kitt Peak	Spacewatch	·	1.2 km	MPC · JPL
425909	2011 FG_{127}	—	January 12, 2002	Kitt Peak	Spacewatch	EUN	1.1 km	MPC · JPL
425910	2011 FE_{132}	—	September 23, 2005	Kitt Peak	Spacewatch	·	1.6 km	MPC · JPL
425911	2011 FG_{132}	—	March 31, 2003	Anderson Mesa	LONEOS	·	4.4 km	MPC · JPL
425912	2011 FS_{134}	—	February 13, 2002	Kitt Peak	Spacewatch	·	1.3 km	MPC · JPL
425913	2011 FE_{141}	—	January 23, 2006	Kitt Peak	Spacewatch	·	2.1 km	MPC · JPL
425914	2011 FJ_{141}	—	October 10, 2004	Kitt Peak	Spacewatch	·	1.4 km	MPC · JPL
425915	2011 FL_{143}	—	October 7, 2008	Kitt Peak	Spacewatch	EMA	3.4 km	MPC · JPL
425916	2011 FD_{148}	—	April 10, 2002	Socorro	LINEAR	·	1.9 km	MPC · JPL
425917	2011 FN_{152}	—	February 10, 2011	Catalina	CSS	·	1.4 km	MPC · JPL
425918	2011 FA_{154}	—	March 27, 2011	Mount Lemmon	Mount Lemmon Survey	·	1.7 km	MPC · JPL
425919	2011 FV_{157}	—	November 16, 2003	Catalina	CSS	·	3.5 km	MPC · JPL
425920	2011 GU_{12}	—	October 11, 2004	Kitt Peak	Spacewatch	·	1.9 km	MPC · JPL
425921	2011 GZ_{13}	—	March 5, 2010	WISE	WISE	·	2.3 km	MPC · JPL
425922	2011 GC_{17}	—	October 1, 2003	Kitt Peak	Spacewatch	EOS	2.0 km	MPC · JPL
425923	2011 GP_{17}	—	April 22, 1998	Kitt Peak	Spacewatch	·	1.4 km	MPC · JPL
425924	2011 GU_{24}	—	April 21, 1998	Socorro	LINEAR	JUN	1.3 km	MPC · JPL
425925	2011 GD_{27}	—	November 3, 2008	Kitt Peak	Spacewatch	EOS	1.9 km	MPC · JPL
425926	2011 GW_{38}	—	November 21, 2009	Kitt Peak	Spacewatch	·	2.1 km	MPC · JPL
425927	2011 GG_{39}	—	February 20, 2006	Kitt Peak	Spacewatch	AGN	1.4 km	MPC · JPL
425928	2011 GY_{39}	—	January 22, 2006	Mount Lemmon	Mount Lemmon Survey	·	1.7 km	MPC · JPL
425929	2011 GS_{46}	—	February 7, 2002	Socorro	LINEAR	EUN	1.8 km	MPC · JPL
425930	2011 GZ_{46}	—	October 20, 2008	Mount Lemmon	Mount Lemmon Survey	·	1.8 km	MPC · JPL
425931	2011 GD_{56}	—	January 23, 2006	Kitt Peak	Spacewatch	·	1.9 km	MPC · JPL
425932	2011 GL_{58}	—	March 27, 2011	Kitt Peak	Spacewatch	EUN	1.5 km	MPC · JPL
425933	2011 GO_{60}	—	April 23, 2007	Mount Lemmon	Mount Lemmon Survey	·	2.0 km	MPC · JPL
425934	2011 GD_{61}	—	December 16, 2009	Mount Lemmon	Mount Lemmon Survey	·	2.1 km	MPC · JPL
425935	2011 GL_{61}	—	March 26, 2011	Mount Lemmon	Mount Lemmon Survey	·	2.1 km	MPC · JPL
425936	2011 GH_{64}	—	February 27, 2007	Kitt Peak	Spacewatch	EUN	1.5 km	MPC · JPL
425937	2011 GP_{64}	—	March 16, 2007	Kitt Peak	Spacewatch	·	1.9 km	MPC · JPL
425938	2011 GC_{65}	—	March 26, 2011	Mount Lemmon	Mount Lemmon Survey	·	2.8 km	MPC · JPL
425939	2011 GU_{67}	—	March 25, 2011	Catalina	CSS	·	2.4 km	MPC · JPL
425940	2011 GQ_{70}	—	April 13, 2011	Kitt Peak	Spacewatch	·	2.5 km	MPC · JPL
425941	2011 GS_{70}	—	December 26, 2005	Mount Lemmon	Mount Lemmon Survey	·	1.8 km	MPC · JPL
425942	2011 GT_{71}	—	December 1, 2005	Kitt Peak	Spacewatch	·	1.5 km	MPC · JPL
425943	2011 GY_{71}	—	October 20, 2008	Mount Lemmon	Mount Lemmon Survey	·	2.4 km	MPC · JPL
425944	2011 GT_{75}	—	January 10, 2006	Mount Lemmon	Mount Lemmon Survey	·	1.3 km	MPC · JPL
425945	2011 GX_{75}	—	April 20, 2007	Kitt Peak	Spacewatch	·	1.4 km	MPC · JPL
425946	2011 GB_{76}	—	March 27, 2011	Mount Lemmon	Mount Lemmon Survey	·	3.5 km	MPC · JPL
425947	2011 GH_{77}	—	September 19, 2003	Kitt Peak	Spacewatch	·	1.9 km	MPC · JPL
425948	2011 GZ_{78}	—	May 11, 2007	Kitt Peak	Spacewatch	·	2.0 km	MPC · JPL
425949	2011 GL_{84}	—	April 1, 2011	Mount Lemmon	Mount Lemmon Survey	EOS	2.2 km	MPC · JPL
425950	2011 GS_{84}	—	September 19, 2003	Kitt Peak	Spacewatch	·	1.9 km	MPC · JPL
425951	2011 GN_{87}	—	December 30, 2005	Kitt Peak	Spacewatch	·	1.4 km	MPC · JPL
425952	2011 HL_{3}	—	November 20, 2008	Kitt Peak	Spacewatch	·	3.2 km	MPC · JPL
425953	2011 HR_{3}	—	May 25, 2006	Mount Lemmon	Mount Lemmon Survey	EOS	1.9 km	MPC · JPL
425954	2011 HY_{3}	—	April 24, 2007	Mount Lemmon	Mount Lemmon Survey	EUN	1.1 km	MPC · JPL
425955	2011 HE_{7}	—	May 18, 2010	WISE	WISE	·	3.3 km	MPC · JPL
425956	2011 HL_{10}	—	March 6, 2011	Kitt Peak	Spacewatch	KOR	1.5 km	MPC · JPL
425957	2011 HL_{11}	—	February 5, 2006	Mount Lemmon	Mount Lemmon Survey	·	1.7 km	MPC · JPL
425958	2011 HC_{14}	—	February 9, 2010	Mount Lemmon	Mount Lemmon Survey	·	2.5 km	MPC · JPL
425959	2011 HC_{16}	—	March 23, 2006	Mount Lemmon	Mount Lemmon Survey	·	1.7 km	MPC · JPL
425960	2011 HH_{18}	—	November 6, 2005	Mount Lemmon	Mount Lemmon Survey	·	1.4 km	MPC · JPL
425961	2011 HL_{19}	—	September 13, 2007	Kitt Peak	Spacewatch	·	2.8 km	MPC · JPL
425962	2011 HY_{20}	—	February 23, 1998	Kitt Peak	Spacewatch	RAF	1.0 km	MPC · JPL
425963	2011 HL_{22}	—	March 14, 2010	WISE	WISE	·	1.9 km	MPC · JPL
425964	2011 HO_{23}	—	April 2, 2011	Kitt Peak	Spacewatch	·	1.9 km	MPC · JPL
425965	2011 HT_{31}	—	September 5, 2008	Kitt Peak	Spacewatch	·	1.9 km	MPC · JPL
425966	2011 HK_{33}	—	December 7, 2005	Kitt Peak	Spacewatch	·	1.2 km	MPC · JPL
425967	2011 HY_{43}	—	April 20, 2007	Kitt Peak	Spacewatch	·	1.2 km	MPC · JPL
425968	2011 HA_{45}	—	March 26, 2011	Kitt Peak	Spacewatch	·	3.8 km	MPC · JPL
425969	2011 HG_{50}	—	April 29, 2011	Mount Lemmon	Mount Lemmon Survey	·	3.5 km	MPC · JPL
425970	2011 HH_{50}	—	February 16, 2010	Kitt Peak	Spacewatch	·	3.1 km	MPC · JPL
425971	2011 HC_{52}	—	December 5, 2005	Mount Lemmon	Mount Lemmon Survey	·	1.7 km	MPC · JPL
425972	2011 HD_{57}	—	April 28, 2011	Kitt Peak	Spacewatch	·	2.1 km	MPC · JPL
425973	2011 HL_{60}	—	April 19, 2010	WISE	WISE	·	2.8 km	MPC · JPL
425974	2011 HX_{60}	—	May 8, 2006	Kitt Peak	Spacewatch	·	2.6 km	MPC · JPL
425975	2011 HS_{63}	—	April 5, 2011	Kitt Peak	Spacewatch	AEO	1.1 km	MPC · JPL
425976	2011 HY_{63}	—	November 2, 2008	Mount Lemmon	Mount Lemmon Survey	·	2.5 km	MPC · JPL
425977	2011 HV_{67}	—	March 13, 2011	Mount Lemmon	Mount Lemmon Survey	·	1.6 km	MPC · JPL
425978	2011 HL_{72}	—	May 3, 2010	WISE	WISE	·	3.4 km	MPC · JPL
425979	2011 HH_{73}	—	November 12, 2005	Kitt Peak	Spacewatch	·	2.0 km	MPC · JPL
425980	2011 HP_{73}	—	December 4, 2005	Kitt Peak	Spacewatch	·	2.0 km	MPC · JPL
425981	2011 HG_{74}	—	January 8, 2006	Mount Lemmon	Mount Lemmon Survey	·	2.0 km	MPC · JPL
425982	2011 HL_{75}	—	February 25, 2006	Mount Lemmon	Mount Lemmon Survey	·	3.8 km	MPC · JPL
425983	2011 HA_{77}	—	May 22, 2006	Kitt Peak	Spacewatch	·	4.5 km	MPC · JPL
425984	2011 HF_{77}	—	December 3, 2008	Mount Lemmon	Mount Lemmon Survey	EOS	2.5 km	MPC · JPL
425985	2011 HO_{77}	—	March 11, 2002	Kitt Peak	Spacewatch	·	1.7 km	MPC · JPL
425986	2011 HR_{81}	—	March 5, 1997	Kitt Peak	Spacewatch	·	1.8 km	MPC · JPL
425987	2011 HD_{82}	—	April 4, 2011	Kitt Peak	Spacewatch	·	2.3 km	MPC · JPL
425988	2011 HK_{82}	—	December 12, 1996	Kitt Peak	Spacewatch	·	1.9 km	MPC · JPL
425989	2011 HX_{82}	—	April 24, 2011	Kitt Peak	Spacewatch	·	3.1 km	MPC · JPL
425990	2011 HV_{84}	—	October 9, 2008	Mount Lemmon	Mount Lemmon Survey	·	1.7 km	MPC · JPL
425991	2011 HX_{84}	—	March 27, 2011	Catalina	CSS	·	1.9 km	MPC · JPL
425992	2011 HR_{89}	—	March 10, 2005	Mount Lemmon	Mount Lemmon Survey	EOS	1.9 km	MPC · JPL
425993	2011 HS_{90}	—	January 23, 2006	Kitt Peak	Spacewatch	·	2.1 km	MPC · JPL
425994	2011 HE_{92}	—	March 27, 2011	Mount Lemmon	Mount Lemmon Survey	·	1.9 km	MPC · JPL
425995	2011 HX_{97}	—	December 25, 2003	Kitt Peak	Spacewatch	·	2.4 km	MPC · JPL
425996	2011 HS_{100}	—	November 2, 2008	Mount Lemmon	Mount Lemmon Survey	·	2.0 km	MPC · JPL
425997	2011 HS_{102}	—	November 26, 2009	Mount Lemmon	Mount Lemmon Survey	·	1.9 km	MPC · JPL
425998	2011 JE_{4}	—	January 1, 1998	Kitt Peak	Spacewatch	VER	3.5 km	MPC · JPL
425999	2011 JF_{6}	—	November 21, 2009	Mount Lemmon	Mount Lemmon Survey	EOS	2.3 km	MPC · JPL
426000	2011 JX_{7}	—	January 14, 2011	Mount Lemmon	Mount Lemmon Survey	·	1.9 km	MPC · JPL

back to top

== Meaning of names ==
As minor planet discoveries are confirmed, they are given a permanent number by the IAU's Minor Planet Center (MPC), and the discoverers can then submit names for them, following the IAU's naming conventions. The list below concerns those minor planets in the specified number-range that have received names, and explains the meanings of those names.

Official naming citations of newly named small Solar System bodies are approved and published in a bulletin by IAU's Working Group for Small Bodies Nomenclature (WGSBN). Before May 2021, citations were published in MPC's Minor Planet Circulars for many decades. Recent citations can also be found on the JPL Small-Body Database (SBDB). Until his death in 2016, German astronomer Lutz D. Schmadel compiled these citations into the Dictionary of Minor Planet Names (DMP) and regularly updated the collection.

Based on Paul Herget's The Names of the Minor Planets, Schmadel also researched the unclear origin of numerous asteroids, most of which had been named prior to World War II. This article incorporates text from this source, which is in the public domain: SBDB New namings may only be added to this list below after official publication as the preannouncement of names is condemned. The WGSBN publishes a comprehensive guideline for the naming rules of non-cometary small Solar System bodies.

Named minor planet	Provisional	This minor planet was named for...	Ref · Catalog
425442 Eberstadt	2010 EJ_{12}	Eberstadt, the most southerly borough of Darmstadt, Germany, near to the castle Frankenstein, and first documented in 782 AD	JPL · 425442
425509 Valyavin	2010 JM_{34}	Gennady Valyavin, Russian astrophysicist and the director of the Special Astrophysical Observatory.	IAU · 425509
