= List of Germans by net worth =

== 2024 German billionaires list top 25 ==
The following Forbes list of German billionaires is based on an annual assessment of wealth and assets compiled and published by Forbes magazine in 2024.

World ranking	Name	Citizenship	Net worth (USD)	Sources of wealth
32	Klaus-Michael Kühne	Germany	39.2 billion	Kuehne + Nagel
37	Dieter Schwarz	Germany	38 billion	Schwarz Gruppe
45	Reinhold Wuerth	Germany	33.6 billion	Würth Group
68	Stefan Quandt	Germany	27.3 billion	BMW
71	Susanne Klatten	Germany	26.5 billion	BMW, Altana, Nordex, SGL Carbon
118	Beate Heister (b. Albrecht) & Karl Albrecht Jr.	Germany	15.9 billion	Aldi Süd
129	Andreas von Bechtolsheim	Germany	14.8 billion	Sun Microsystems, Arista Networks
135	Theo Albrecht Jr.	Germany	14 billion	Aldi Nord and Trader Joe's
164	Hasso Plattner	Germany	12.1 billion	SAP
195	Georg Schaeffler	Germany	10.9 billion	Schaeffler Group
203	Friedhelm Loh	Germany	10.6 billion	Friedhelm Loh Group
232	Andreas Strüngmann	Germany	9.8 billion	Hexal, BioNTech
232	Thomas Strüngmann	Germany	9.8 billion	Hexal, BioNTech
256	Ludwig Merckle	Germany	9.4 billion	Phoenix Pharmahandel, Ratiopharm, HeidelbergCement, Kässbohrer
266	August von Finck Jr.	Germany	9.2 billion	Merck Finck & Co., Allianz, Hochtief, Löwenbräu, Mövenpick Hotels & Resorts
287	Alexander Otto	Germany	8.8 billion	ECE Group
317	Michael Otto	Germany	8.1 billion	Otto Group
329	Michael Herz	Germany	7.9 billion	Tchibo, Beiersdorf
329	Wolfgang Herz	Germany	7.9 billion	Tchibo, Beiersdorf
358	Jürgen Blickle	Germany	7.4 billion	SEW Eurodrive
385	Nadia Thiele	Germany	7.1 billion	Knorr-Bremse
432	Wolfgang Marguerre	Germany	6.4 billion	Octapharma
432	Maximilian Viessmann	Germany	6.4 billion	Viessmann
498	Theo Müller	Germany	5.9 billion	Müller
511	Erich Wesjohann	Germany	5.8 billion	EW Group
529	Wolfgang Reimann	Germany	5.6 billion	JAB Holdings
529	Matthias Reimann-Andersen	Germany	5.6 billion	JAB Holdings
529	Stefan Reimann-Andersen	Germany	5.6 billion	JAB Holdings
529	Renate Reimann-Haas	Germany	5.6 billion	JAB Holdings
1201	Klaus Tschira	Germany	2.8 billion	SAP
1267	Aloys Wobben	Germany	2.6 billion	Enercon
1321	Friedrich Knapp	Germany	2.5 billion	New Yorker
1401	Lutz Meschke	Germany	2.3 billion	Porsche
1542	Martin Herrenknecht	Germany	2 billion	Herrenknecht
1618	Udo Müller	Germany	1.9 billion	Ströer
1694	Jörn Rausing	Germany	1.8 billion	Tetra Laval
1760	Ralph Dommermuth	Germany	1.7 billion	United Internet
1829	Stefan Persson	Germany	1.6 billion	H&M
2083	Andreas Seifert	Germany	1.2 billion	Lidl
2145	Helga Kellerhals	Germany	1.1 billion	Keller Group

== 2015 German billionaires list top 40 ==
World ranking	Name	Citizenship	Net worth (USD)	Sources of wealth
21	Georg Schaeffler	Germany	26.9 billion	Schaeffler Group
37	Beate Heister (b. Albrecht) & Karl Albrecht Jr.	Germany	21.3 billion	Aldi Süd
46	Dieter Schwarz	Germany	19.4 billion	Schwarz Gruppe
49	Theo Albrecht Jr.	Germany	19 billion	Aldi Nord and Trader Joe's
50	Michael Otto	Germany	18.1 billion	Otto Group
54	Susanne Klatten	Germany	16.8 billion	BMW, Altana, Nordex, SGL Carbon
59	Stefan Quandt	Germany	15.6 billion	BMW
77	Johanna Quandt	Germany	13.9 billion	BMW
103	Klaus-Michael Kühne	Germany	11.9 billion	Kuehne + Nagel
137	Hasso Plattner	Germany	9.1 billion	SAP
153	Klaus Tschira	Germany	8.6 billion	SAP
172	August von Finck Jr.	Germany	7.7 billion	Merck Finck & Co., Allianz, Hochtief, Löwenbräu, Mövenpick Hotels & Resorts
185	Dietmar Hopp	Germany	7.2 billion	SAP
201	Maria-Elisabeth Schaeffler	Germany	6.7 billion	Schaeffler Group
201	Reinhold Wuerth	Germany	6.7 billion	Würth Group
220	Heinz Hermann Thiele	Germany	6.4 billion	Knorr-Bremse
230	Curt Engelhorn	Germany	6.2 billion	Boehringer Mannheim
309	Karl-Heinz Kipp	Germany	5.0 billion	Real
352	Heinrich Deichmann	Germany	4.6 billion	Heinrich Deichmann-Schuhe
352	Ludwig Merckle	Germany	4.5 billion	Phoenix Pharmahandel, Ratiopharm, HeidelbergCement, Kässbohrer
360	Michael Herz	Germany	4.5 billion	Tchibo, Beiersdorf
360	Wolfgang Herz	Germany	4.5 billion	Tchibo, Beiersdorf
369	Guenther Fielmann	Germany	4.4 billion	Fielmann
393	Aloys Wobben	Germany	4.2 billion	Enercon
418	Wolfgang Reimann	Germany	4.0 billion	JAB Holding Company, Reckitt Benckiser
418	Matthias Reimann-Andersen	Germany	4.0 billion	JAB Holding Company, Reckitt Benckiser
418	Stefan Reimann-Andersen	Germany	4.0 billion	JAB Holding Company, Reckitt Benckiser
418	Renate Reimann-Haas	Germany	4.0 billion	JAB Holding Company, Reckitt Benckiser
418	Friede Springer	Germany	4.0 billion	Axel Springer AG
435	Ralph Dommermuth	Germany	3.9 billion	United Internet
435	Andreas von Bechtolsheim	Germany	3.9 billion	Sun Microsystems, Arista Networks
462	Traudl Engelhorn	Germany	3.7 billion	Boehringer Mannheim, Corange
462	Ursula Engelhorn	Germany	3.7 billion	Boehringer Mannheim, Corange
462	Theo Müller	Germany	3.7 billion	Müllermilch, Nordsee, Mueller Quaker Dairy
481	Elizabeth Mohn	Germany	3.6 billion	Bertelsmann, Bertelsmann Foundation
497	Martin Viessmann	Germany	3.5 billion	Viessmann Group
512	Christa Gelpke	Germany	3.4 billion	Boehringer Mannheim, Corange
512	Erich Kellerhals	Germany	3.4 billion	Media-Saturn-Holding
533	Heinz-Georg Baus	Germany	3.4 billion	Bauhaus, Praktiker
534	Axel Oberwelland	Germany	3.3 billion	August Storck, Werther's Original
535	Patrick von Faber-Castell & Caroline Gotzens (b. Faber-Castell)	Germany	3.0 billion	Faber-Castell, Sal. Oppenheim Jr. & Cie., Infront Sports Media

== See also ==
- Forbes list of billionaires
- List of countries by the number of billionaires
