= Retail industry =

Economic branch

The retail industry comprises retail businesses that sell goods and services directly to end consumers. It is a fundamental pillar of modern commerce, influencing consumption patterns, urban infrastructure, and labor markets. In major classification systems, retail is treated as a distinct set of activities.

Over millennia, retail has evolved from ancient barter marketplaces to modern omnichannel systems integrating physical stores and digital platforms. Today, retail is a large source of jobs and economic activity in many countries. In the United States, retail is described as the largest employer in the private sector. This sector employed about 16.2 million people (approximately 12.6% of nonfarm business employment) in 2022, supporting millions more in related logistics and services. The retail market is also described as very large globally, with projected worldwide retail sales of about $31.3 trillion in 2025, and U.S. retail sales of about $7.26 trillion in 2024. U.S. retail and food services together contribute over $5.3 trillion annually to the national gross domestic product and support more than one in four jobs in the country.

The industry is commonly segmented by merchandise category (such as grocery, apparel, and electronics) and is organized differently across classification systems. Over recent decades, consolidation through mergers and acquisitions has been described as a major structural trend, alongside the rise of large multinational retailers and major e-commerce platforms. Retail formats and infrastructure have changed substantially over time, including the spread of self-service stores, shopping centers, barcode scanning and point-of-sale systems, as well as the expansion of e-commerce. Retail profit margins tend to be slim and vary widely by sector and geography, but many leading retailers generate substantial profits due to scale, control of supply chains, and operational efficiency. Publicly listed retailers often achieve profit margins with percentages in the low single-digit to mid-single-digit range.

The retail industry has had many innovations, from the invention of permanent shopfronts and marketplaces to department stores, malls, and now digital commerce. In the 2010s and early 2020s, retailers increasingly adopted omnichannel models, and some stores experimented with automation and cashierless checkout. During the COVID-19 pandemic, online sales growth accelerated sharply in some markets, including a reported surge in U.S. e-commerce sales in 2020.

== Definition ==
According to the United Nations Statistics Division, retail is the Division: 63 - Retail trade services; repair services of personal and household goods. In the International Standard Industrial Classification (ISIC Rev.4), the retail industry is part of Section G: “Wholesale and retail trade; repair of motor vehicles and motorcycles.” Within this section, retail trade is primarily represented by Division 47: “Retail trade, except of motor vehicles and motorcycles.” (Retail sale of motor vehicles and motorcycles is covered in Division 45, alongside vehicle repair.) ISIC distinguishes retail from wholesale based on the buyer: retail involves selling chiefly to the general public (household consumers), whereas wholesale is selling to business or institutional clients. Thus, Divisions 46 and 47 cover all non-vehicle sales activities, with Division 47 specifically covering retail sales to consumers. In the NAICS, the retail industry is designated as Sector 44–45, “Retail Trade.” According to the official NAICS 2022 definition, “The Retail Trade sector comprises establishments primarily engaged in retailing merchandise, generally without transformation, and rendering services incidental to the sale of merchandise.” The retailing process is described as the final step in the distribution of merchandise: retailers are organized to sell goods in small quantities directly to the general public (household consumers). In essence, NAICS defines retail trade as businesses that do not produce goods themselves, but instead purchase and sell goods (with minimal processing) to end-use consumers, often providing related customer services.

== Commercial significance and statistics ==
U.S. Monthly Retail Sales, 1992–2010

=== World ===
National accounts show a combined total of retail and wholesale trade, with hotels and restaurants. in 2012 the sector provides over a fifth of GDP in tourist-oriented island commerce, as well as in other major countries such as Brazil, Pakistan, Russia, and Spain. In all four of the latter countries, this fraction is an increase over 1970, but there are other countries where the sector has declined since 1970, sometimes in absolute terms, as other sectors have replaced its role in the commerce. In the United States the sector has declined from 19% of GDP to 14%, though it has risen in absolute terms from $4,500 to $7,400 per capita per year. In China the sector has grown from 7.3% to 11.5%, and in India even more, from 8.4% to 18.7%. Emarketer predicts China will have the largest retail market in the world in 2016.

In 2016, China became the largest retail market in the world. In the Republic of Armenia, retail trade has been increasing recently. In October 2022, it increased by 23.1% year by year, which was the most considerable rise since April 2021, faster than the 20.7 per cent increase recorded a month earlier. Retail dropped by 1.9% after accumulating 2.1%in the earlier month. For the first 10 months of 2022, retail sales increased by 15.5% by measuring the exact time of 2021. Among its bordering countries, on retail trade percentage of GDP, Armenia ranks more increased than Turkey, but it is still lower than Georgia.

As of the early 2020s, retail is a major employer and revenue generator. In the United States alone, the retail trade sector employed about 16.2 million people (approximately 12.6 % of nonfarm business employment) in 2022, supporting millions more in related logistics and services. U.S. retail and food services together contribute over $5.3 trillion annually to the national GDP and support more than one in four jobs in the country. Globally, the retail market is immense: total worldwide retail sales are projected at around USD 31.3 trillion in 2025, with U.S. retail sales alone reaching approximately USD 7.26 trillion in 2024. Because patronage at a retail outlet varies, flexibility in scheduling is desirable. Employee scheduling software is sold, which, using known patterns of customer patronage, more or less reliably predicts the need for staffing for various functions at times of the year, day of the month or week, and time of day. Usually needs vary widely. Conforming staff utilization to staffing needs requires a flexible workforce which is available when needed but does not have to be paid when they are not, part-time workers; as of 2012 70% of retail workers in the United States were part-time. This may result in financial problems for the workers, who while they are required to be available at all times if their work hours are to be maximized, may not have sufficient income to meet their family and other obligations.

Many leading brands actively target tourists who travel specifically to shop or allocate a significant portion of their spending to retail while on vacation. According to the Global Retail Tourism Market Report 2019–2023, the global shopping tourism market was valued at approximately $1.2 trillion in 2018. The report projected steady growth, with a compound annual growth rate (CAGR) of 6.7% between 2019 and 2023. Building on this trend, Kogan Page published the book Leading Travel and Tourism Retail in 2023, offering an in-depth analysis of the travel retail sector and its evolution in the post-COVID era. Retail profit margins tend to be slim and vary widely by sector and geography, but many leading retailers generate substantial profits due to scale, control of supply chains, and operational efficiency. For example, European discount retailer Schwarz Group (owner of Lidl and Kaufland) reported revenue of €175.4 billion in fiscal year 2024, with nearly 595,000 employees worldwide. Meanwhile, publicly listed retailers often achieve profit margins in the low single-digit to mid-single-digit range.

=== United States ===
The National Retail Federation and Kantar annually rank the nation's top retailers according to sales. The National Retail Federation also separately ranks the 100 fastest-growing U.S. retailers based on increases in domestic sales.

Since 1951, the U.S. Census Bureau has published the Retail Sales report every month. It is a measure of consumer spending, an important indicator of the US GDP. Retail firms provide data on the dollar value of their retail sales and inventories. A sample of 12,000 firms is included in the final survey and 5,000 in the advanced one. The advanced estimated data is based on a subsample from the US CB complete retail and food services sample.

Retail is the largest private-sector employer in the United States, supporting 52 million working Americans. As of the early 2020s, retail is a major employer and revenue generator. In the United States alone, the retail trade sector employed about 16.2 million people (approximately 12.6% of nonfarm business employment) in 2022, supporting millions more in related logistics and services. U.S. retail and food services together contribute over $5.3 trillion annually to the national GDP and support more than one in four jobs in the country. Globally, the retail market is immense: total worldwide retail sales are projected at around USD 31.3 trillion in 2025, with U.S. retail sales alone reaching approximately USD 7.26 trillion in 2024.

=== Central Europe ===
In 2011, the grocery market in six countries of Central Europe was worth nearly €107bn, 2.8% more than the previous year when expressed in local currencies. The increase was generated foremost by the discount stores and supermarket segments, and was driven by the skyrocketing prices of foodstuffs. This information is based on the latest PMR report entitled Grocery retail in Central Europe 2012 European discount retailer Schwarz Group (owner of Lidl and Kaufland) reported revenue of €175.4 billion in fiscal year 2024, with nearly 595,000 employees worldwide.

=== Global top ten retailers ===
As of 2016, China was the largest retail market in the world.

Worldwide top ten retailers 2026
Rank	Company	Headquarters	Total revenue	Business foundation	Worldwide store count
1	Walmart	United States	US$692 billion	Hypermarket/supercenter/superstore	10,816
2	Amazon	United States	US$422 billion	Ecommerce	620
3	Schwarz Gruppe	Germany	US$189 billion	Discount grocery store	14,667
4	Aldi	Germany	US$166 billion	Discount grocery store	14,215
5	Costco	United States	US$266 billion	Cash & carry/warehouse club	915
6	Ahold Delhaize	Netherlands	US$103 billion	Grocery store	9,937
7	Carrefour	France	US$93 billion	Hypermarket/supermarket	13,318
8	IKEA	Sweden	US$49 billion	Furniture	486
9	Home Depot	United States	US$162 billion	Home improvement/tools	2,362
10	Walgreens Boots Alliance	United States	US$127 billion	Pharmacy	11,605

== Industry structure and major players ==
=== Major segments ===
The retail industry globally tends to be segmented into grocery, apparel, electronics, etc.

United nations divides retail into following groups

- 631 - Food retailing services
- 632 - Non-food retailing services
- 633 - Repair services of personal and household goods

In ISIC, Retail trade is divided into:

- 471 Retail sale in non-specialized stores
- 472 Retail sale of food, beverages and tobacco in specialized stores
- 473 Retail sale of automotive fuel in specialized stores
- 474 Retail sale of information and communications equipment in specialized stores
- 475 Retail sale of other household equipment in specialized stores
- 476 Retail sale of cultural and recreation goods in specialized stores
- 477 Retail sale of other goods in specialized stores
- 478 Retail sale via stalls and markets
- 479 Retail trade not in stores, stalls or markets

In NAICS, the divisions are:

- 441 Automobile, Other Motor Vehicle, Parts, Accessories, and Tire Dealers
- 442 Furniture and Home Furnishings Stores
- 443 Electronics and Appliance Stores
- 444 Building Material, Lawn and Garden Equipment and Supplies Dealers
- 445 Grocery, Specialty Food and Alcohol Stores
- 446 Health and Personal Care Stores
- 447 Gasoline Stations
- 448 Clothing, Shoe, Jewelry, Luggage, and Leather Goods Stores

=== Consolidation and mergers ===
Among retailers and retails chains in North America, Europe and China, a lot of consolidation has appeared over the last couple of decades. Between 1988 and 2010, worldwide 40,788 mergers and acquisitions with a total known value of US$2.255 trillion have been announced. The largest transactions with involvement of retailers in/from the United States have been: the acquisition of Albertson's Inc. for US$17 billion in 2006, the merger between Federated Department Stores Inc with May Department Stores valued at 16.5 bil. USD in 2005 – now Macy's, and the merger between Kmart Holding Corp and Sears Roebuck & Co with a value of US$10.9 billion in 2004.

Between 1985 and 2018 there have been 46,755 mergers or acquisitions conducted globally in the retail sector (either acquirer or target from the retail industry). These deals cumulate to an overall known value of around US$2,561 billion. The three major Retail M&A waves took place in 2000, 2007 and lately in 2017. However the all-time high in terms of number of deals was in 2016 with more than 2,700 deals. In terms of added value 2007 set the record with the US$225 billion.

This wave of consolidation has left a relatively small number of very large companies dominating global retail. The top 10 global retailers by revenue in 2020 included giants from the U.S., Europe, and Asia. At #1 was Walmart (U.S.), with annual revenue of about $520 billion; more than double that of the second-largest, Amazon (U.S.), which had around $281 billion. Other leaders included Costco (U.S.), Schwarz Group (Germany, known for Lidl discount stores), and Aldi (Germany), each with well over $100 billion in sales. Rounding out the top ten were companies like Carrefour (France), Ahold Delhaize (Netherlands), and two Chinese e-commerce powerhouses; JD.com and Alibaba; reflecting the growing importance of online retail. Alibaba total annual revenue for the year 2020 was $71.985 billion with the majority from commerce sales and strong Single's Day performance despite COVID-19 impacts. These top retailers operate across dozens of countries and often span multiple retail formats. For example, Walmart and Costco run enormous brick-and-mortar stores worldwide, while Amazon and Alibaba operate predominantly online platforms (along with some physical outlets).

Here is a list of the top ten largest deals (ranked by volume) in the Retail Industry:

Date Announced	Acquiror Name	Acquiror Mid Industry	Acquiror Nation	Target Name	Target Mid Industry	Target Nation	Value of Transaction ($mil)
11 January 2006	CVS Corp	Other Retailing	United States	Caremark Rx Inc	Healthcare Providers & Services (HMOs)	United States	26,293.58
3 September 2007	AB Acquisitions Ltd	Other Financials	United Kingdom	Alliance Boots PLC	Other Retailing	United Kingdom	19,604.19
18 December 2000	Shareholders	Other Financials	United Kingdom	Granada Compass-Hospitality	Food & Beverage Retailing	United Kingdom	17,914.68
20 January 2006	AB Acquisition LLC	Other Financials	United States	Albertsons Inc	Food & Beverage Retailing	United States	17,543.85
26 February 2013	Home Depot Inc	Home Improvement Retailing	United States	Home Depot Inc	Home Improvement Retailing	United States	17,000.00
28 February 2005	Federated Department Stores	Discount and Department Store Retailing	United States	May Department Stores Co	Non Residential	United States	16,465.87
30 August 1999	Carrefour SA	Food & Beverage Retailing	France	Promodes	Food & Beverage Retailing	France	15,837.48
19 June 2012	Walgreen Co	Other Retailing	United States	Alliance Boots GmbH	Other Retailing	Switzerland	15,292.48
7 February 2007	Wesfarmers Ltd	Food & Beverage Retailing	Australia	Coles Group Ltd	Food & Beverage Retailing	Australia	15,287.79
6 March 2011	Wal-Mart Stores Inc	Discount and Department Store Retailing	United States	Wal-Mart Stores Inc	Discount and Department Store Retailing	United States	14,288.00

== Origins ==
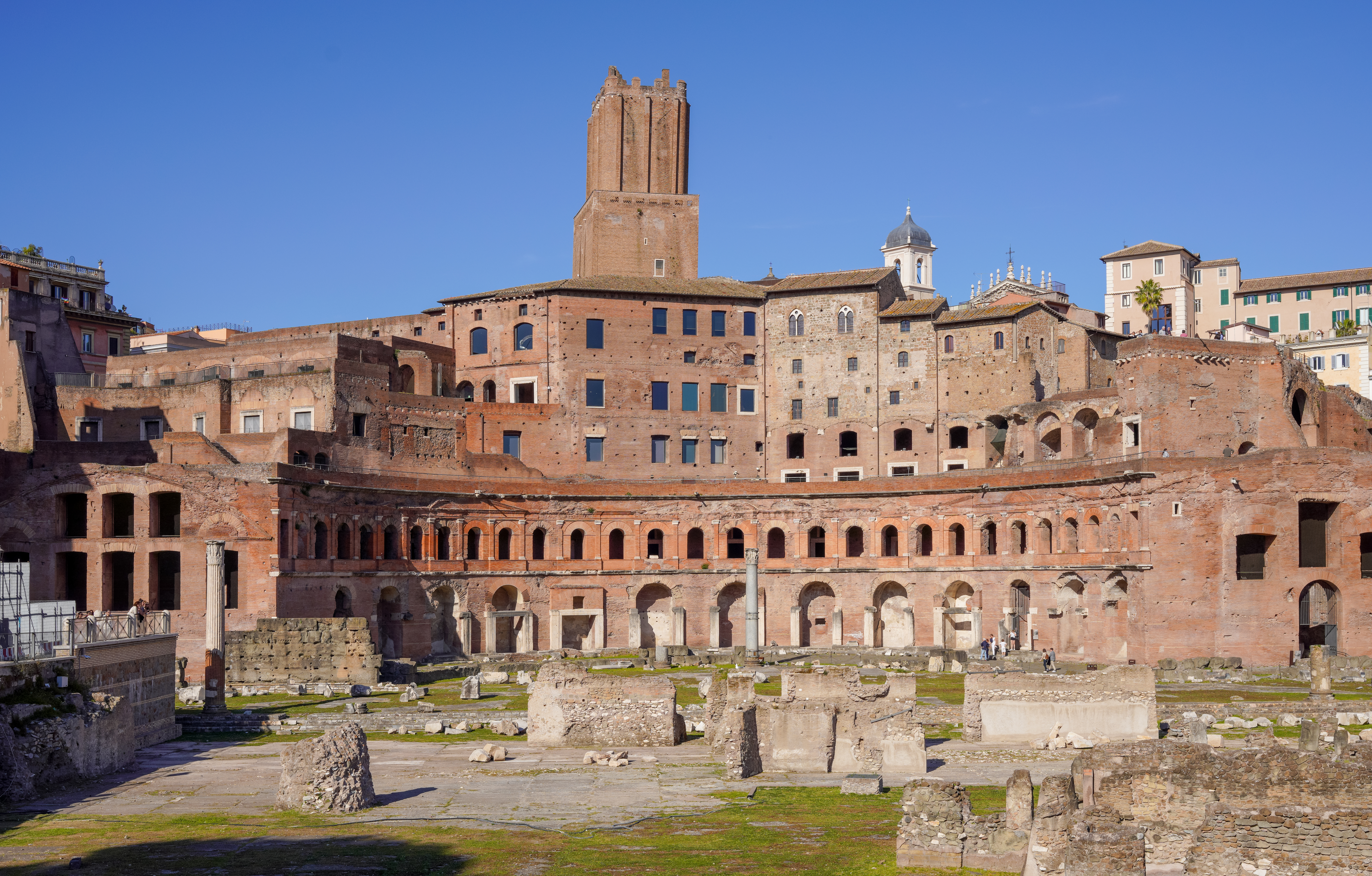
Marketplace at Trajan's Forum, the earliest known example of permanent retail shopfronts

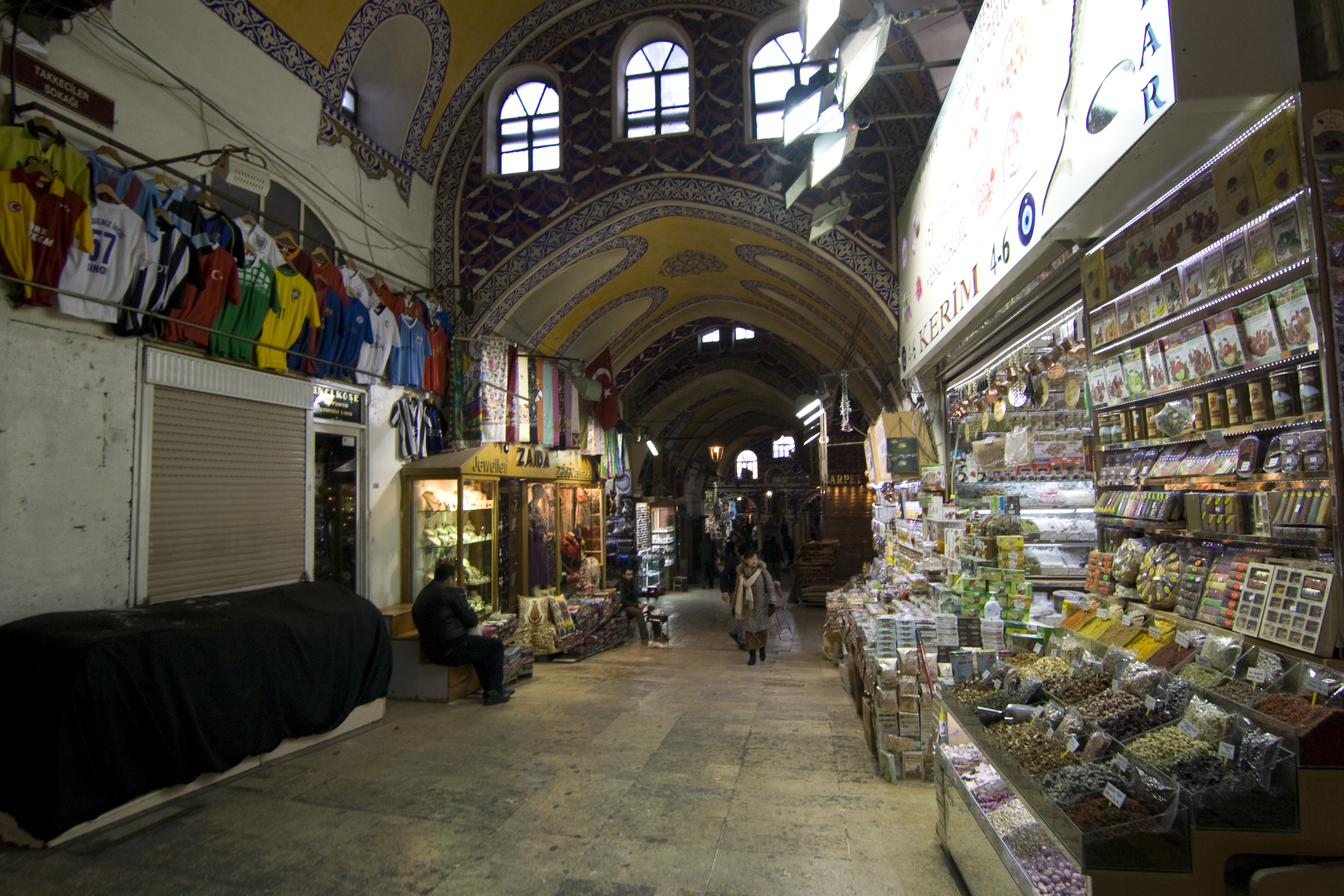
Grand Bazaar, Istanbul (interior). Established in 1455, it is thought to be the oldest continuously operating covered market.

Retail markets have existed since ancient times. Archaeological evidence for trade, probably involving barter systems, dates back more than 10,000 years. As civilizations grew, barter was replaced with retail trade involving coinage. Selling and buying are thought to have emerged in Asia Minor (modern Turkey) in around the 7th-millennium BCE. In ancient Greece, markets operated within the agora, an open space where, on market days, goods were displayed on mats or temporary stalls. Research from July 2008 suggests that China exhibited a rich history of early retail systems. From as early as 200 BCE, Chinese packaging and branding were used to signal family, place names and product quality, and the use of government imposed product branding was used between 600 and 900 CE. Eckhart and Bengtsson have argued that during the Song dynasty (960–1127), Chinese society developed a consumerist culture, where a high level of consumption was attainable for a wide variety of ordinary consumers rather than just the elite. In ancient Rome, trade took place in the forum. The Roman forum was one of the earliest example of a permanent retail shop-front. Trajan's Forum in Rome (2nd century CE) featured multi-level shop-lined halls and is considered one of the earliest examples of permanent retail shopfronts.

In Medieval England and Europe, relatively few permanent shops were to be found; instead, customers walked into the tradesman's workshops where they discussed purchasing options directly with tradesmen. In the more populous cities, a small number of shops were beginning to emerge by the 13th century. Outside the major cities, most consumable purchases were made through markets or fairs. Market-places appear to have emerged independently outside Europe. The Grand Bazaar in Istanbul is often cited as the world's oldest continuously operating market; its construction began in 1455. The Spanish conquistadors wrote glowingly of markets in the Americas. In the 15th century, the Mexica (Aztec) market of Tlatelolco was the largest in all the Americas.

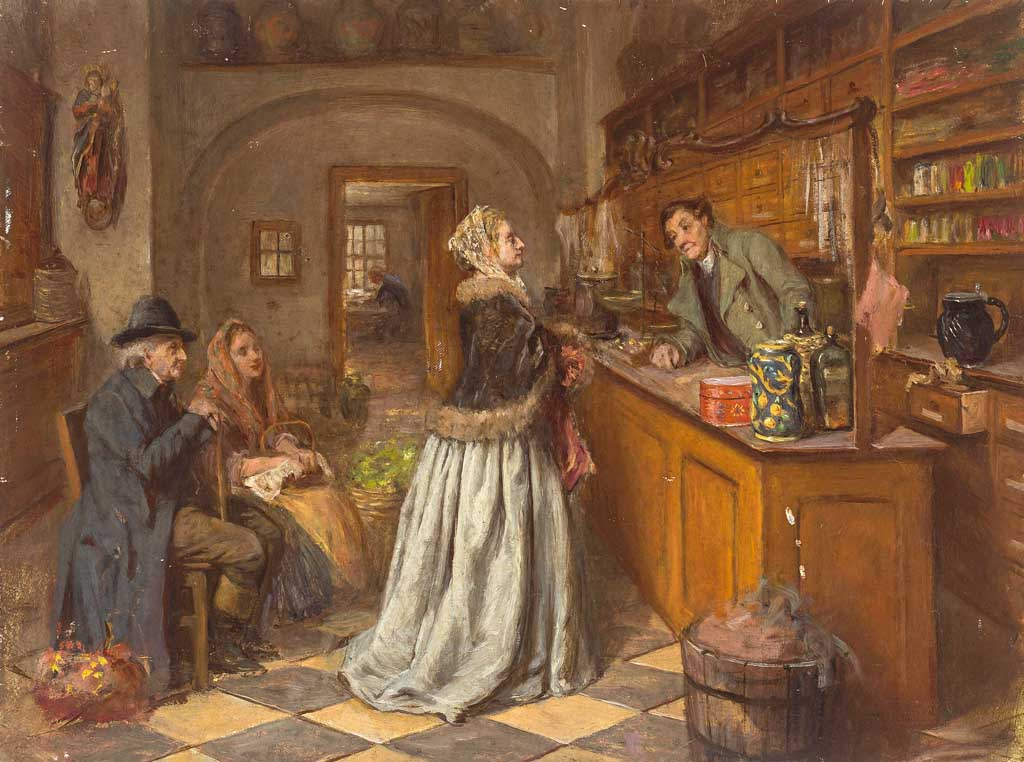
The retail service counter was an innovation of the 18th century.

== Modern retail ==
=== Early modern era ===
By the 17th century, permanent shops with more regular trading hours were beginning to supplant markets and fairs as the main retail outlet. Provincial shopkeepers were active in almost every English market town. As the number of shops grew, they underwent a transformation. The trappings of a modern shop, which had been entirely absent from the 16th- and early 17th-century store, gradually made way for store interiors and shopfronts that are more familiar to modern shoppers. Prior to the 18th century, the typical retail store had no counter, display cases, chairs, mirrors, changing rooms, etc. However, the opportunity for the customer to browse merchandise, touch and feel products began to be available, with retail innovations from the late 17th and early 18th centuries.

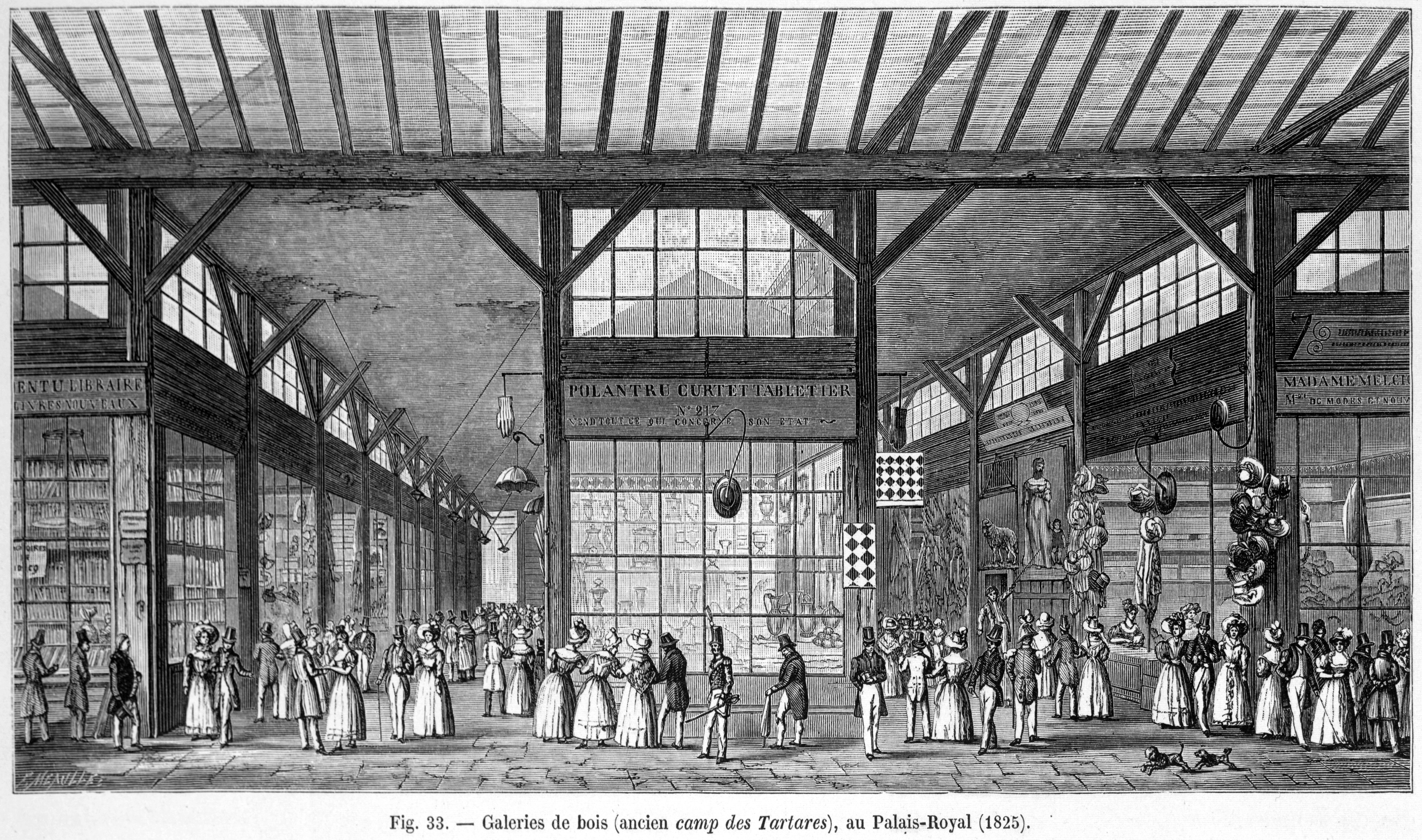
Galeries de bois at au Palais-Royal, one of the earliest shopping arcades in Europe

By the late 18th century, grand shopping arcades began to emerge across Europe and in the Antipodes. A shopping arcade refers to a multiple-vendor space, operating under a covered roof. Typically, the roof was constructed of glass to allow for natural light and to reduce the need for candles or electric lighting. Some of the earliest examples of shopping arcade appeared in Paris, due to its lack of pavement for pedestrians. While the arcades were the province of the bourgeoisie, a new type of retail venture emerged to serve the needs of the working poor. John Stuart Mill wrote about the rise of the co-operative retail store, which he witnessed first-hand in the mid-19th century.

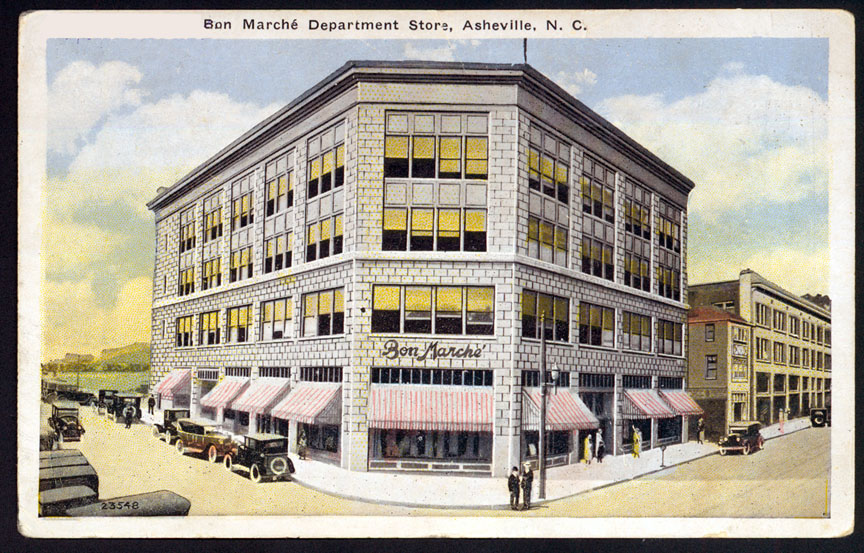
Department stores, such as Le Bon Marché of France, appeared from the mid-19th century.

=== Modern era ===
The modern era of retailing is defined as the period from the industrial revolution to the 21st century. In major cities, the department store emerged in the mid- to late 19th century, and permanently reshaped shopping habits, and redefined concepts of service and luxury. Many of the early department stores were more than just a retail emporium; rather they were venues where shoppers could spend their leisure time and be entertained. Retail, using mail order, came of age during the mid-19th century. Although catalogue sales had been used since the 15th century, this method of retailing was confined to a few industries such as the sale of books and seeds. However, improvements in transport and postal services led several entrepreneurs on either side of the Atlantic to experiment with catalogue sales. Founded in 1916, Piggly Wiggly introduced the self-service retail model where customers picked goods off shelves themselves, instead of giving orders to clerks.

In the post-war period, an American architect, Victor Gruen developed a concept for a shopping mall: a planned, self-contained shopping complex complete with an indoor plaza, statues, planting schemes, piped music, and car-parking. Gruen's vision was to create a shopping atmosphere where people felt so comfortable, they would spend more time in the environment, thereby enhancing opportunities for purchasing. The first of these malls opened at Northland Mall near Detroit in 1954. Throughout the twentieth century, a trend towards larger store footprints became discernible. The average size of a U.S. supermarket grew from 31,000 square feet (2,900 m^{2}) square feet in 1991 to 44,000 square feet (4,100 m^{2}) square feet in 2000. By the end of the twentieth century, stores were using labels such as "mega-stores" and "warehouse" stores to reflect their growing size. The upward trend of increasing retail space was not consistent across nations and led in the early 21st century to a 2-fold difference in square footage per capita between the United States and Europe.

=== 21st century before COVID-19 ===
As the 21st century takes shape, large retail stores have come under increasing pressure from online sales models and reductions in store size are evident. Overexpansion of malls and big-box chains brought fierce competition and other issues such as business debt. By the 2010s, a combination of factors led to what some dubbed the retail apocalypse; a wave of store closures and chain bankruptcies, particularly in North America. Well-known chains like Toys “R” Us, Sears, and JCPenney shrank dramatically or entered bankruptcy. From 2010 onward, thousands of U.S. stores were shuttered each year, and the decline accelerated around 2017 and again in 2020. Not everyone agreed on the term “apocalypse,” noting that many retailers continued to expand and that overall retail sales kept growing, but there was undoubtedly a significant shakeout in the industry. By the end of the 2010s, retailers were increasingly focusing on experiential store concepts and online integration to lure back customers. Large format stores that once dominated retail were rethinking their footprints, while some malls began redeveloping empty space into offices, hotels, or community use.

=== Recent trends and the impact of COVID-19 ===
In the early 2020s, retail has been shaped by the rapid growth of e-commerce and by the disruptive impact of the COVID-19 pandemic. Online retail sales had been steadily rising each year, but the pandemic dramatically accelerated that trend. In 2020, as lockdowns and social distancing kept people out of physical stores, e-commerce sales surged by 43% in the United States; jumping from about $571 billion in 2019 to $815 billion in 2020. This represented an unprecedented increase of nearly $244 billion in a single year. Globally, a similar story unfolded: the share of online sales in total retail climbed sharply. Before the pandemic, around 16% of retail sales worldwide were online; by the end of 2020, online's share had grown to roughly 19%, a level that held in 2021 as well. Markets with strict lockdowns saw especially large shifts to e-commerce. For instance, countries like the UK and South Korea reached over a quarter of retail sales online in 2021; among the highest in the world.

=== Major downturn in 2020s ===
In the 2020s the retail industry has been marked by major downturns across many distinct types of stores. Thousands of stores closed in 2025, with thousands more predicted to close. As of 2026, Macys announced plans to shut down 150 stores. In 2026 CVS closed about 270 locations, after shutting about 900 locations between 2022 and 2024. Walgreens had a major reduction of stores in 2025, and shut down over 500 locations.

In 2024, Rite Aid had only about 1300 retail locations, a major reduction from its 2100 active locations in 2023.

== Retail technology and infrastructure ==
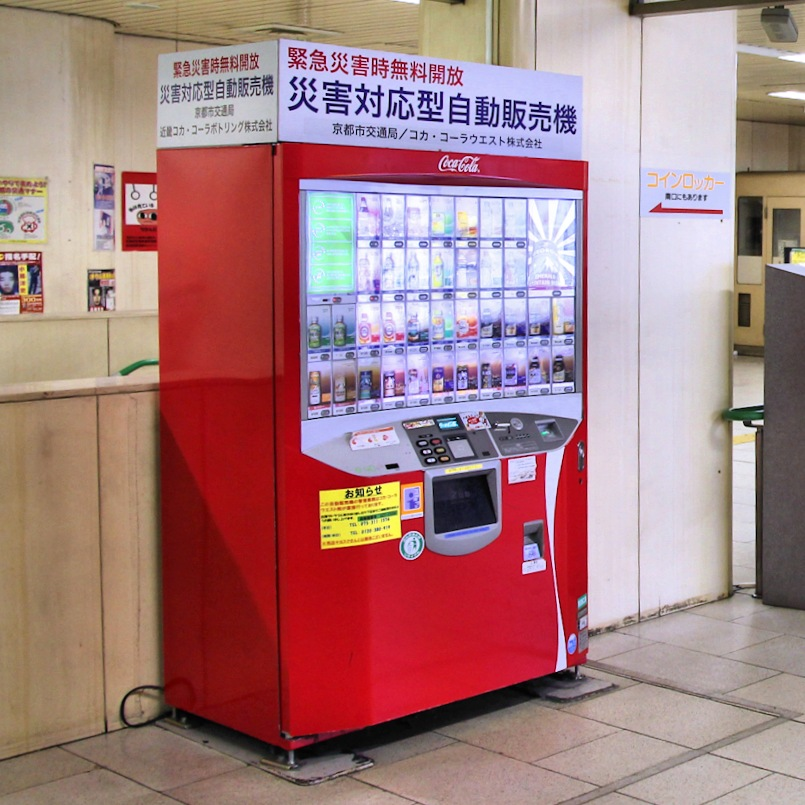
Japan has the largest number of vending machines per capita.

- Vending Machines (1880s): The earliest known reference to a vending machine is in first-century Roman Egypt. This machine accepted a coin and then dispensed wine or holy water. Coin-operated machines that dispensed tobacco were being operated as early as 1615 in the taverns of England. The machines were portable and made of brass. Simon Denham was awarded British Patent no. 706 for his stamp dispensing machine in 1867, the first fully automatic vending machine. The first modern coin-operated vending machines were introduced in London, England, in the early 1880s, dispensing postcards. The first vending machine in the U.S. was built in 1888 by the Thomas Adams Gum Company, selling gum on New York City train platforms. In 1893, Stollwerck, a German chocolate manufacturer, was selling its chocolate in 15,000 vending machines. It set up separate companies in various territories to manufacture vending machines to sell not just chocolate, but cigarettes, matches, chewing gum, and soap products.
- Self-Service Stores (1910s): The concept of customer self-service in retail debuted in the early 20th century. In 1916, Piggly Wiggly opened in Memphis as the first self-service grocery store, allowing shoppers to freely pick items from shelves with a basket, rather than handing a list to a clerk. This innovation dramatically reduced labor costs (fewer clerks were needed) and empowered customers to browse and impulse-buy; it soon became the standard for supermarkets and many other retail formats.
- Shopping Malls (1950s): The modern suburban shopping mall was pioneered by Victor Gruen in the 1950s. Northland Center (1954) and Southdale Center (1956) introduced the idea of a planned, multi-store complex with ample parking and, in Southdale's case, an enclosed, climate-controlled environment. Malls offered convenience (many stores in one place) and became social hubs. By bringing the “downtown” shopping experience to the suburbs, malls changed consumer lifestyles and spurred decades of retail real estate development worldwide.
- Discount Mega-Stores (1960s): A new wave of large discount chains emerged in the 1960s, focused on high volume and low prices. Notably, Walmart, Kmart, and Target were all founded in 1962, heralding a shift toward big-box retailing in huge, no-frills stores. These retailers scaled rapidly by offering a wide array of goods (initially general merchandise, and later groceries) at prices undercutting smaller competitors. By the late 20th century, discount and mass merchandise stores had come to dominate retail: for example, discount retailers’ share of U.S. retail sales grew from 42% in 1967 to roughly 87% by 2010.
- Hypermarkets and Big-box stores (1960s–1980s): Building on the discount store model, hypermarkets combined supermarkets and department stores into an even larger format. The first hypermarket was opened by Carrefour in France in 1963, featuring thousands of products including food, apparel, and household goods in a one-stop shop. Hypermarkets (and similar Big-box store formats in the U.S.) proliferated from the 1970s onward, offering convenience and economies of scale. These massive stores (often 100,000+ square feet) became common in suburban areas globally, particularly in Europe, North America, and parts of Asia.

=== Computerized tools and resources ===
- Barcode Scanning and IT Systems (1970s): The 1970s saw transformative technological advances in retail. The Universal Product Code (UPC) was introduced and in 1974 the first checkout barcode scanner was installed, ushering in automated scanning at grocery checkouts. This innovation greatly reduced checkout times and errors, and allowed retailers to keep digital records of inventory. By the 1980s, barcode scanning and computerized point-of-sale systems were widespread. Retailers like Walmart leveraged these technologies early; adopting UPC scanning in 1983, to track sales in real time and manage inventory across their supply chains. Eventually, these systems enabled practices like just-in-time inventory and data-driven reordering, making retail operations far more efficient.
- E-Commerce and Online Retail (1990s–2000s): The rise of the internet created a new retail channel online. The mid-1990s brought the launch of Amazon (initially selling books online) and eBay (an online marketplace), followed by countless other e-commerce sites. Consumers gradually embraced the convenience of shopping from home. By the early 2000s, online retail was growing at double-digit rates annually. Retailers responded by building their own websites and, later, mobile shopping apps. Amazon in particular grew explosively; by 2020 it had become the world's second-largest retailer by revenue (after Walmart), with over $280 billion in sales. The e-commerce boom also led to new services like online marketplaces for third-party sellers, digital payment systems, personalized product recommendations, and more.
- Omnichannel Retailing (2010s): As online shopping surged, traditional retailers in the 2010s adopted omnichannel strategies to blend physical and digital channels. This meant creating seamless integration between a retailer's stores, website, and mobile app; allowing customers to, for example, buy online and pick up in-store (BOPIS), or return online purchases at a local store. Retailers invested in better inventory visibility so that customers could see online if a product was in stock locally. They also used data from loyalty programs and online browsing to personalize marketing across channels. The goal of omnichannel retail was to meet customers wherever they are and provide a convenient, consistent experience; whether one shops via smartphone, computer, or in a brick-and-mortar outlet.
- Cashierless Stores and Automation (late 2010s): The late 2010s have brought experimental new retail technologies. In 2018, Amazon opened the first Amazon Go convenience store in Seattle, introducing a cashierless “Just Walk Out” shopping experience. Shoppers scan their phone on entry, take products off the shelf, and simply walk out with their items; sensors and computer vision systems detect what was taken and automatically charge the shopper's Amazon account, eliminating checkout lines. This technology, based on artificial intelligence and cameras, is being tested and adopted by other retailers as well. In addition, stores have begun using robots and automation for tasks like shelf-scanning for inventory, warehouse picking, and even customer service robots in-store. While still emerging, these innovations point toward a future where routine retail operations (and potentially jobs like cashiers) could be significantly automated.
