= Ceslav Ciuhrii =

Moldovan businessman

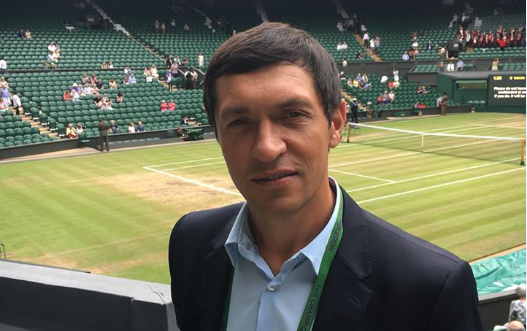
- Born: July 14, 1973 (age 53); Bahmut, Călărași, Republic of Moldova
- Citizenship: Moldova; Romania
- Occupations: Biotechnologist, businessman, investor, philanthropist
- Children: 4

Ceslav Ciuhrii (born July 14, 1973, Bahmut, Călărași, Republic of Moldova) is a Moldovan biotechnologist, businessman and philanthropist. Since June 11, 2018, he has been serving as President of the National Tennis Federation of Moldova.

He is the developer of the "Satul German" real estate project, considered one of the largest in the Republic of Moldova, and is active in the pharmaceutical industry, where he founded a pharmaceutical factory in Romania.

Ciuhrii is a citizen of both the Republic of Moldova and Romania.

== Biography ==
Ceslav Ciuhrii was born on July 14, 1973, in the town of Bahmut in Călărași district, to Svetlana Ciuhrii (born August 20, 1947 – died June 13, 2004) and Mircea Ciuhrii (born August 13, 1944 – died December 31, 2015), the latter being a doctor habilitatus in biology, specializing in virology, with a doctorate defended at the Lomonosov Institute, Moscow; member of the New York Academy of Sciences.

Ceslav studied at the State University of Moldova, Faculty of Biology and Chemistry, specializing in "Microbiology and Virology". He graduated from university in 1995 and pursued master's and doctoral studies. In 2010, he defended his doctoral thesis at the Academy of Sciences of Moldova, Institute of Microbiology and Biotechnology, on the topic "Obtaining substances used in the treatment of benign prostatic hyperplasia". Among the research results is adenoprosin, a pharmaceutical active substance approved since 2005 and later patented under his name.

== Career ==
Ceslav Ciuhrii is active in the fields of real estate, media, and pharmaceuticals, and is also involved in hospitality and restaurant projects. He has developed several major projects in Chisinau, and in parallel has invested in over ten startups in the Republic of Moldova. His activity includes both direct investments and partnerships with international groups.

=== Pharmaceutical industry and health ===
Since 1998, he has studied biologically active substances developed by his father, and in 2003 received the first approvals for clinical studies. In 2005, production of the pharmaceutical active substance adenoprosin, derived from insect tissue, was authorized. After approval granted by the Drug Agency in 2006, manufacturing of the medicine based on adenoprosin began. For producing the raw material, he acquired a specialized factory, and the final preparation is made by a third-party unit.

In 1998, he launched the company Newtone Laboratories, and later the companies Biotehnos and Entofarm. These companies deal with the production of pharmaceutical raw materials, specializing in the treatment of osteoarthritis. Ciuhrii owns pharmaceutical companies in Romania, Russia, and other CIS countries. He also opened companies for the sale and promotion of pharmaceutical products in Bucharest in 1998 and in Russia in 2015. Since 2015, he has been developing his own sales and distribution team for the product in Romania and several CIS countries, including Kazakhstan, Belarus and Ukraine.

He is a member of the Council for Strategic Institutional Development of Nicolae Testemițanu State University of Medicine and Pharmacy.

In 2021, Ceslav Ciuhrii initiated the construction of a pharmaceutical factory in Tomești, Iași County, Romania, through the company Newtone Laboratories. The project, estimated at 5 million euros (excluding equipment), is being developed on a plot of approximately 3–4 hectares with a built area of over 9,500 m^{2}. The factory was designed for the production of injectable vials, suppositories, creams, and care products, with high-capacity production lines. The unit represents an extension of his activities in the pharmaceutical industry, with Newtone Laboratories known for developing the active substance Adenoprosin, as well as for marketing supplements and cosmetic products.

=== Hospitality and gastronomy ===
Ceslav Ciuhrii invested in the restaurant industry, owning establishments such as "Mi Piace" and "Cactus", which he later sold. In 2017, Ciuhrii acquired the "Casa Sărbătorii" event hall. After a period of renovation, the venue was renamed "Regata Events", and later - "Madison Park".

=== Real estate ===
Ceslav Ciuhrii played an important role in bringing the German chain Kaufland to the Republic of Moldova, handling the identification and preparation of land for the construction of the first stores.

Between 2017 and 2018, Regata Imobiliare, owned by Ceslav Ciuhrii, sold to Kaufland four plots of land located on bd. Decebal, bd. Mircea cel Bătrân, str. Nicolae Testemițanu, and str. Kiev (the former Palace of Trade Unions), on which the company's first hypermarkets in Chisinau were built. Ciuhrii stated that the role of "Kaufland developer" involved a complex process, including legal and geotechnical analysis, land acquisition, development of urban planning documentation, and coordination of authorization and construction phases.

Also in 2017, the press reported that Ceslav Ciuhrii purchased the Guguță café in downtown Chisinau. The property was acquired through the company Regata Imobiliare, with the intention of developing a multifunctional complex. The project generated public discussion and legal proceedings related to the status of the building and land. The controversy particularly focused on attempts by civic organizations and local authorities to preserve the cinema and adjacent area for cultural and community spaces, while the investor maintained that he aimed to valorize the land through a major private investment.

"Satul German" is a residential project initiated by the company Regata Imobiliare on a plot of approximately 80 hectares located on the outskirts of Chisinau. According to public information, the development plan includes the construction of low-rise residential blocks, individual villas, a school and a kindergarten, as well as commercial and sports spaces. The project also includes infrastructure work, such as roads, underground utility networks, and green areas.

According to Ceslav Ciuhrii, preparation of the project began with the gradual acquisition of land and expansion of utility networks. The project continued in stages, including during the economic crisis and regional conflict.

In 2023, on the initiative of Ceslav Ciuhrii, the National Tennis Federation of Moldova built the National Tennis Center in the "Satul German" neighborhood of Chisinau. The complex includes 6 covered hard-surface courts, two of which are central courts with stands for 300 spectators, as well as 7 uncovered clay courts. The project, compared by Ciuhrii to the USTA center in Orlando, was presented as one of the most modern tennis centers in the region.

As part of the project, the first hotel of the international ibis Styles network in the Republic of Moldova was also built, in partnership with the Accor Group. The hotel was inaugurated in September 2025, following an investment of approximately 12 million euros. The complex has 100 rooms, a modular events center of over 200 m^{2}, restaurant, bar, terrace, fitness room, and 45 parking spaces. Located on the main road to Chisinau International Airport, the project is considered an important step in modernizing the capital's tourism infrastructure and strengthening Moldova's attractiveness as a destination in Central and Eastern Europe.

The total value of the investment in "Satul German" is estimated at 260 million euros, of which about 100 million for infrastructure.

=== Media ===
In July 2022, Ceslav Ciuhrii became the owner of the company "Noroc Media", which owns the radio station "Radio Noroc" and the channel "Noroc TV". According to public records and his statements, the acquisition aimed to develop "a dignified media channel that promotes national culture and young talent". "Radio Noroc" broadcasts on 18 frequencies across the country, and "Noroc TV" is distributed via cable networks, both stations specializing in popular music in Romanian.

== Philanthropy ==
Ceslav Ciuhrii has been involved over time in supporting social and cultural projects in the Republic of Moldova, with a focus on education, culture, sports, and youth. These include the personal development program for adolescents "Leaders of the Third Millennium" (2016–2019). In 2019, he supported the "Give and Win" campaign through a donation of 50,000 lei for each beneficiary family. In 2020, Ciuhrii contributed 100,000 lei for the restoration of the National Philharmonic "Serghei Lunchevici" in Chisinau, affected by a fire.

=== Ceslav Ciuhrii Charity Foundation ===
At the end of 2020, the founding of the Ceslav Ciuhrii Charity Foundation was announced. The organization's first project was "Give the Magic of a Story" - a publication with texts written by children from Gymnasium No. 3 in Chisinau, sold for charity. The project included a cover drawing contest, and distribution and promotion were carried out together with partners Librarius, Gastrobar, Oliva Verde Restaurant, and Tucano Coffee Moldova; organizational support came from the Donate for Children Foundation.

Another project implemented is "Saving Little Hearts", through which the foundation financially supports children in the Republic of Moldova who suffer from heart disease and need expensive surgical interventions performed abroad.

In collaboration with CCF Moldova, the foundation rolled out the "We Participate Now!" project, through which 15 sensory rooms and 3 sensory gardens were set up in schools in the Republic of Moldova, with training for parents, teachers, and students for their use. The project was financially supported, including through the foundation's role as strategic partner at the Generosity Gala (2023), where a donation of over 74,000 euros for these sensory spaces was announced.

In the medical field, the "Ceslav Ciuhrii" Foundation, in partnership with the MAD-Aid Association, funded the renovation of the Neurosurgery Department of the Mother and Child Institute in Chisinau, a project valued at 219,000 euros (fully covered by the foundation), which aimed at reconfiguring spaces, installing networks (electricity, water, medical gases), cladding, adapted furniture, and modernized sanitary facilities. Previously, the same collaboration supported the renovation of the Newborn Surgery Department within the same institute.

On the educational component, as part of an initiative dedicated to young talents and in cooperation with the "Satul German" real estate project, the foundation awarded a monthly scholarship of 5,000 lei for the 2024–2025 academic year to a student of the Faculty of Urban Planning and Architecture (TUM), winner of the design competition organized by "Satul German"; other participants received prizes.

For community support, the foundation supported the operation of the toy library in the village of Jevreni (Criuleni district) through a donation of 100,000 lei covering 12 months of activity, providing children from disadvantaged families with access to toys, books, school supplies, and pedagogical support for homework, in partnership with The Moldova Project (the "Adopt a Toy Library" initiative).

=== Support for refugees from Ukraine ===
At the beginning of the war in Ukraine, in February 2022, Ceslav Ciuhrii made the "Madison Park" complex available to refugees, located in his ownership in the Valea Morilor area of Chisinau. The space was used to accommodate approximately 150 people, who received accommodation and food provided by the complex's restaurant. Madison Park employees also became involved, contributing donations from their salaries and volunteering for logistical support. The complex also provided food to refugees housed at the Moldexpo placement center, opened by authorities. During the same period, the Ceslav Ciuhrii Foundation also made donations worth 100,000 lei to funds managed by authorities in the Republic of Moldova and 80,000 lei to the Public Association "Moldova AID", for accommodation and food for the first Ukrainian refugees who arrived in the country.

In June 2022, the Accor hotel group donated 25,000 euros to the Ceslav Ciuhrii Foundation, contributing to providing shelter and basic products for approximately 3,000 people, mostly women and children, in difficulty.

=== Sports support ===
Ciuhrii supports sports in the Republic of Moldova both through the Ceslav Ciuhrii Charity Foundation, and through the companies he owns.

As president of the National Tennis Federation of Moldova, Ceslav Ciuhrii has contributed to sponsoring tournaments and supporting the training of Moldovan athletes, including Radu Albot, Alexandru Cozbinov, Egor Matvievici, Dmitrii Baskov, Maxim Cazac, Vitalia Stamat, Alexandra Perper, Lia Belibova, and Ilie Snițari. Ciuhrii financially supported the participation of coaches from the Republic of Moldova in international conferences dedicated to women's tennis. He also financially supported the Republic of Moldova's participation in the Davis Cup.

In 2022, on the occasion of Chisinau's City Day, the Ceslav Ciuhrii Foundation, in partnership with the National Tennis Federation of Moldova (FNTM) and with the support of the Regata company, built two clay tennis courts in "La Izvor" park in the Buiucani sector of the capital. The project, worth 1.7 million lei, was carried out according to international standards and provides free access for the public and young athletes. Subsequently, the courts were transferred to the management of the local authorities of Chisinau municipality.

== Controversies ==
=== The "Guguță" Café ===
In June 2017, the company Regata Imobiliare SRL, associated with Ceslav Ciuhrii through Biotehnos SRL, acquired from Finpar Invest the buildings of the former "Guguță" café in the "Ștefan cel Mare și Sfânt" Public Garden. The reconstruction project, which provided for the construction of a socio-cultural and recreation center with commercial and office spaces, was followed by various positions from civil society regarding the protection of the historic area.

Ciuhrii stated that the acquisition and project documentation comply with legal provisions, specifying that the land is not within the protected park perimeter and that the transaction was carried out at market price, estimated at over 2 million euros. In the following years, the authorities issued successive approvals and different decisions.

In 2018, the Chisinau Court of Appeal confirmed Regata Imobiliare's right to build, a decision upheld by the Supreme Court of Justice. Subsequently, the National Council for Historical Monuments and the City Hall annulled the favorable acts, and the dispute continued. In 2021, the Chisinau Court declared illegal the acts by which the project had been suspended, and in 2023 the Court of Appeal admitted the company's request regarding the annulment of some administrative decisions. In February 2024, the Ministry of Culture announced that it would challenge the decision at the Supreme Court of Justice, the process being ongoing.

=== The legal process in Tomești (Romania) ===
In Iași County, Ceslav Ciuhrii developed the Newtone Laboratories pharmaceutical factory, an investment estimated at 5 million euros, part of the expansion of his activities in the pharmaceutical industry in Romania. Near the site, entrepreneur Ion Băietrău obtained, on November 28, 2024, a building permit for a collective housing block.

According to representatives of Newtone Laboratories, the construction of the building in the vicinity could influence the development and operation of the factory. In this context, the company contested in court the building permit and some associated administrative acts, in a case having as parties the Tomești Commune City Hall and HG Employ SRL. On May 15, 2025, the Iași Tribunal, Second Civil Section, Administrative and Fiscal Litigation, ordered the suspension of the execution of the permit until the final resolution of the case. On September 4, 2025, the court postponed the hearing of the case, and on October 30, 2025, Newtone Laboratories SRL withdrew from continuing the action.
