= Heinrich Deichmann =

German entrepreneur (born 1962)

Heinrich Otto Deichmann (born 30 November 1962 in Essen, West Germany) is a German entrepreneur and CEO of the family business Heinrich Deichmann-Schuhe GmbH.

== Biography ==
Deichmann was born to Heinz-Horst and Ruth Deichmann, the only son in a family of four siblings. After finishing high school in 1982, Heinrich Otto studied business administration, historical sciences, philosophy and theology at the University of Cologne.

His father Heinz-Horst Deichmann, who was a medical doctor and entrepreneur in Essen, Germany, founded the Heinrich Deichmann-Schuhe GmbH. The company goes back until 1913 when the ancestors of the Deichmann family opened a shoe store named Deichmann-Schuhe GmbH in Essen. As of 1989 to 1999 he started as a managing director in the family company and became chairman of the board when he took over in 1999 from his father, who died in October 2014. The company is now Europe's leading shoe retailer. It operates some 3,600 stores in 24 countries, including the Rack Room Shoes and Off Broadway chains in the U.S.

Deichmann is one of the richest Germans with an estimated Net Worth as of March 2017 with US$7.7 billion.

=== Personal life ===
Deichmann is married and father of two children. He likes to go to museums and classical music concerts.
