= Christa Gelpke =

German-Swiss philanthropist

Christa Gelpke, née Engelhorn (born June 30, 1932 in Mannheim; died February 1, 2014 in Küsnacht), was a German–Swiss patron.

== Life ==
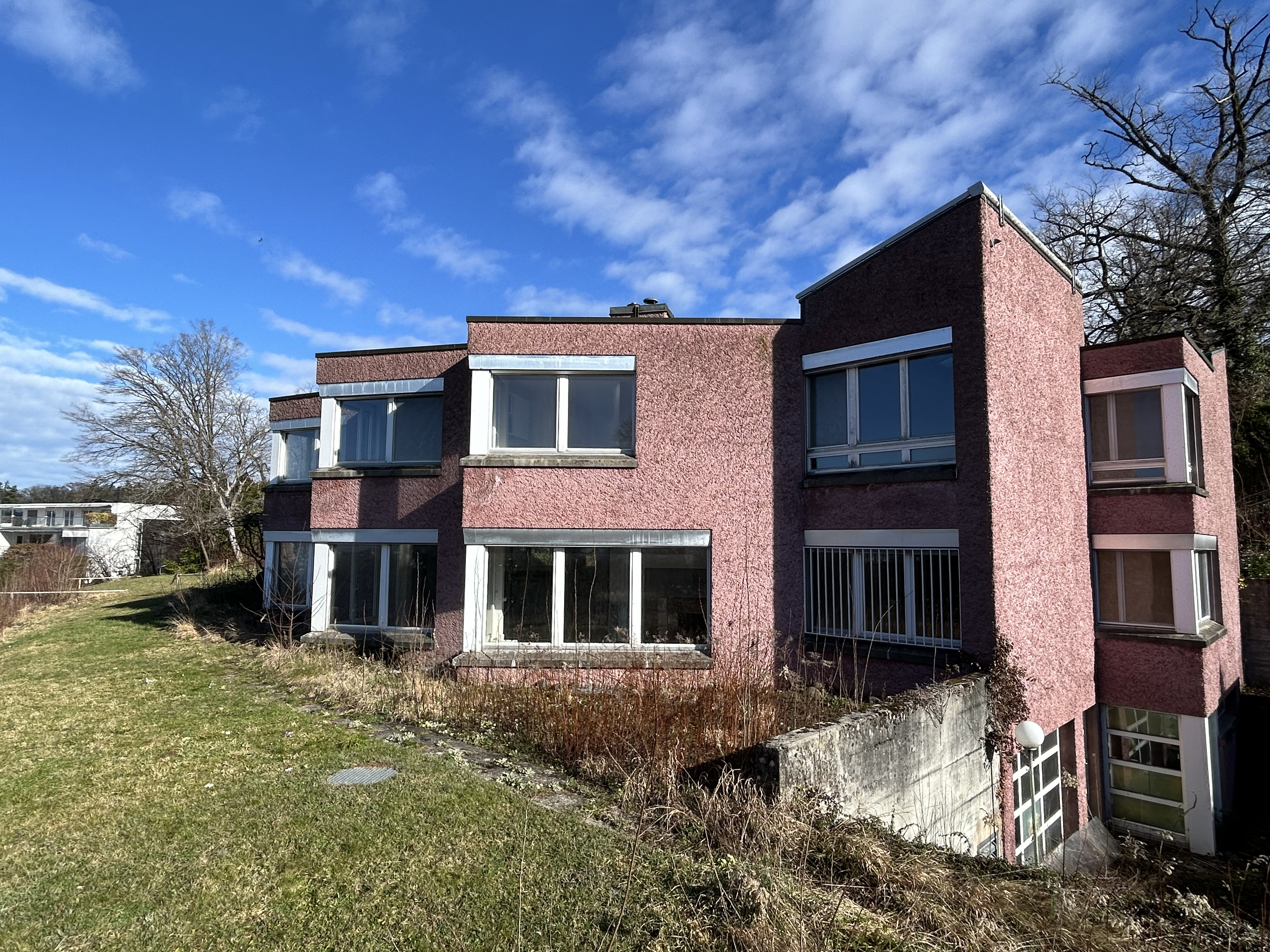
Villa Gelpke-Engelhorn, February 2024

Christa Engelhorn was born in Mannheim in 1932 as the third child of Fritz Carl Engelhorn (1886–1956) and Annamarie Engelhorn, née Clemm (1899–1981), and had two older brothers. Her great-grandfather Friedrich Engelhorn founded the chemical company BASF in Ludwigshafen in 1865. Gelpke's cousin Curt Engelhorn headed the family company Boehringer Mannheim for over 30 years.

The company was sold to Roche in 1997 for 19 billion DM. Christa Gelpke owned 18 percent of Böhringer shares, so the sale of the company brought her 2.8 billion Swiss francs. In 2013, she was ranked 81st among the richest Germans in the Manager Magazin list. According to the Forbes list, her fortune in 2015 was about 3.4 billion US dollars.

With part of the proceeds from the sale of her share in the family holding company, Gelpke established the Drosos Foundation in October 2003. The foundation is committed, among other things, to education, nutrition and health in poor regions as well as to climate and environmental protection. At Gelpke's request, she remained anonymous as a founder until the board of trustees decided to publish her name in 2020. Above all, "this was to preserve a fitting memory of the founder".

She was married to the Swiss architect and town planner Wendelin Gelpke (1932–2001) until their divorce in 1965. They had a daughter and two sons. Her son Nikolaus Konstantin Gelpke is a marine biologist and publisher. Her brother-in-law was the Islamic scholar Rudolf Gelpke.

Christa Gelpke worked as a photographer and took portrait and reportage photographs for magazines, including the Swiss cultural magazine Du. Some of her works can be found in the "Image + Sound" database of the Swiss Social Archives.

From 1971 to 1973, Gelpke had the architect Beate Schnitter build her a "hidden" house with a view of Lake Zurich, the Villa Gelpke-Engelhorn, at Zumikerstrasse 20a in Küsnacht. After her death, its proposed replacement received media attention. Christa Gelpke died on February 1, 2014, at the age of 81 in Küsnacht. It was not until April 2021 that the Zurich Heritage Society recognized the house as worthy of protection.
