= Rack Room Shoes =

American footwear retailer

- Type: Division of Deichmann Group
- Industry: Retail
- Founded: Salisbury, North Carolina, 1922
- Founder: Phil Levinson
- Headquarters: Charlotte, North Carolina, U.S.
- Number of locations: 450+
- Products: Footwear
- Parent: Deichmann SE (since 1973)
- Divisions: Off Broadway Shoe Warehouse
- Website: rackroomshoes.com

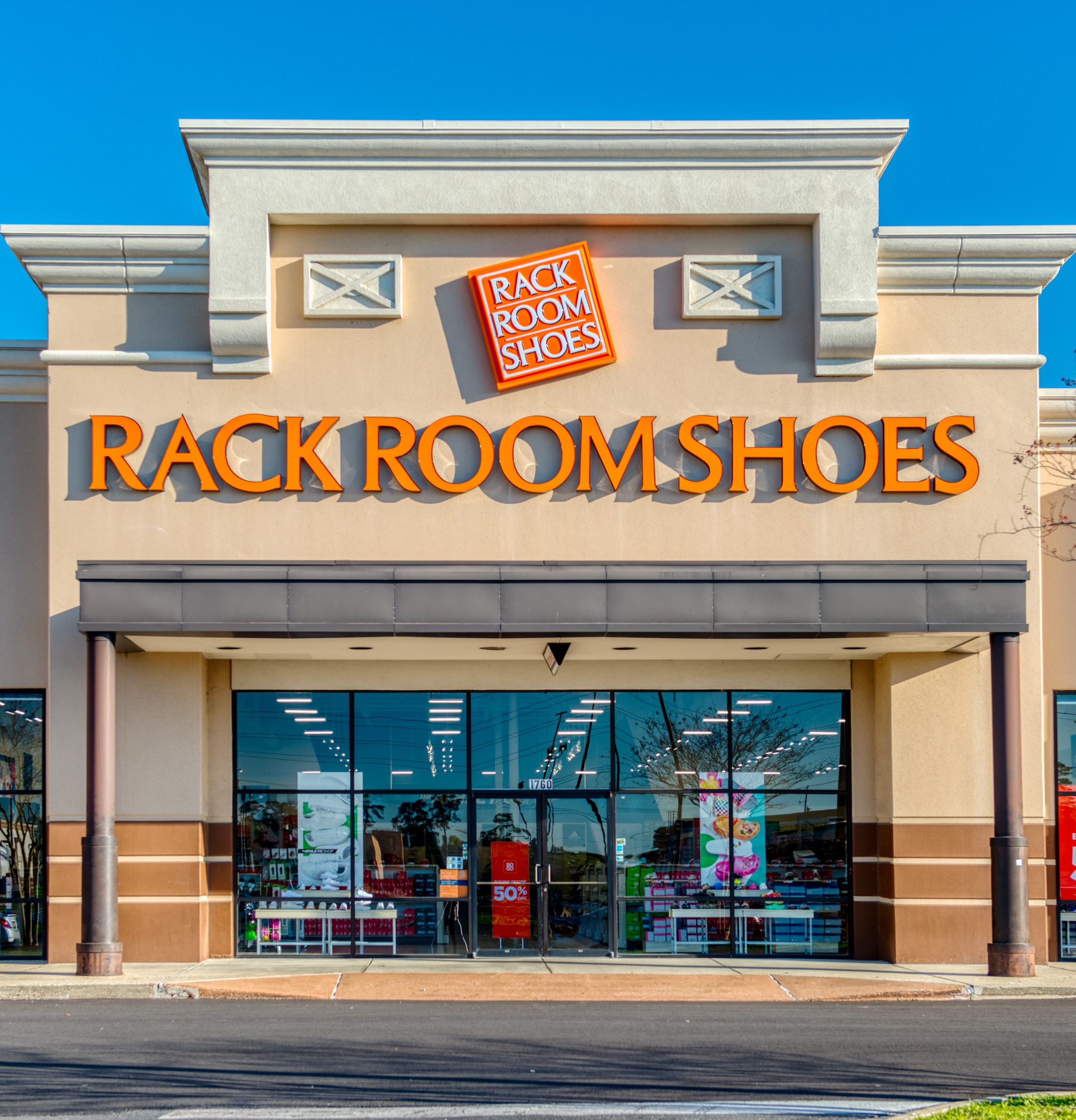
Rack Room Shoes store in Lake Charles, Louisiana

Rack Room Shoes is an American footwear retailer headquartered in Charlotte, North Carolina, which operates over 500 stores in 36 states under the Rack Room Shoes and Off Broadway Shoe Warehouse brands.

The two brands offer a variety of styles for women, men, and children in athletic, comfort, and dress categories, as well as accessories, backpacks, shoe care items, and socks.

The company also owns private label footwear brands including: Bjorndal, Bluefin, Cupcake Couture, Xappeal, Limelight, Restoration, Lauren Blakwell, Pesaro, West Harris, and Michael by Michael Shannon.

== History ==
The company was founded in 1922 in Salisbury, North Carolina by Phil Levinson, and originally had the name "Phil's Shoe". In 1956, Levinson sold the stores to his son-in-law, Mort Lerner, the owner of Lerner's Shoes. Mort Lerner changed the name of the stores to Rack Room Shoes. In 1984, Rack Room Shoes was purchased by the privately held Deichmann Group of Germany, Europe's largest and most well-known shoe retailer.

Rack Room Shoes purchased Off Broadway Shoe Warehouse in 2002 and completed merging its operating functions with those of Off Broadway Shoe Warehouse in 2021. The merger allows the retailer's customers to earn loyalty points through one program, shop one ecommerce site, and pick-up, return and exchange merchandise at either of the brands’ locations.

== Company focus ==
In 2016, Rack Room Shoes launched the Athletic Shop, with an increased emphasis on its athletic offering. The Athletic Shop is a shop-within-a-shop concept in brick and mortar stores and e-commerce spaces.
