= Dieter Schwarz =

German businessman and former CEO of Lidl (born 1939)

- Born: 24 September 1939 (age 87); Heilbronn, Germany
- Occupation: Businessman
- Title: Former chairman and CEO of Lidl and Kaufland
- Term: 1977-2004
- Successor: Klaus Gehrig
- Spouse: Franziska Weipert (m. 1963)
- Children: 2 daughters

Dieter Schwarz (born 24 September 1939) is a German billionaire businessman, and owner of the Schwarz-Gruppe. He is the former chairman and CEO of the supermarket chain Lidl, and the hypermarket chain Kaufland. As of 2025, he has the highest net worth in Germany.

== Career ==
=== Founding of the Lidl Discount Corporation (1973) ===
In 1973, Dieter Schwarz opened his first discount store in Ludwigshafen am Rhein on Mundenheimer Straße. Unable to freely adopt the name "Lidl" for legal reasons and wishing to avoid the unintended wordplay "Schwarzmarkt" (black market), he secured the rights by purchasing the naming rights from retired vocational school teacher and artist Ludwig Lidl for 1,000 Deutsche Mark. Following Lidl’s expansion across Germany, the company began entering markets in other parts of Europe starting in 1988.

By 2022, Lidl operated approximately 12,000 stores across Europe and the United States, making it the world’s largest discount retail chain by number of locations.

=== Founding of the Kaufland Supermarket Chain (1984) ===
In 1968, Dieter Schwarz and his father opened their first supermarket under the name Handelshof in Backnang, a town in the Swabian region. In 1984, the first store under the new name Kaufland was launched in Neckarsulm, with all existing Handelshof locations subsequently rebranded. After German reunification in 1989/90, Kaufland expanded aggressively into the eastern federal states, initially retaining the Handelshof name in some locations (e.g., Freiberg/Sa, Leipziger Straße). The first Kaufland supermarket in East Germany opened in Meißen in 1990. Today, Kaufland dominates the supermarket sector in eastern Germany. The company’s international expansion began in 1998 with a store in Kladno, Czech Republic, followed by further outlets across Central and Eastern Europe.

As of 2020, Kaufland operates over 1,470 supermarkets in Europe.

== Net worth ==
In 2009, he was estimated to be worth 10 billion euro. As of October 2012, he was estimated to be worth 12 billion euro, an increase from 11.5 billion euro in 2011. In 2013, he was estimated be worth €19.6 billion, and ranked the 24th richest person in the world. As of February 2014, he was ranked as 23rd richest person in the world in the Hurun Report Global Rich List.

In 2023, Forbes listed Schwarz as the wealthiest man in Germany and the 25th richest person in the world with an estimated net worth of US$47.2 billion. Since 1999, Schwarz manages his resources through the tax-exempt Dieter Schwarz Foundation (gGmbH, limited liability company with a charitable purpose), when he transferred his shares in Lidl and Kaufland into it, deciding just how much of his profits go into the foundation. The Dieter Schwarz Foundation supports education and daycare facilities for children, for example, as well as science and research projects.

According to the 2025 Forbes list of the world's richest people, Dieter Schwarz is ranked #37 with a net worth of $41 billion, making him the wealthiest person in Germany.

== Personal life ==
In 1963, Schwarz married Franziska Weipert. They live in Heilbronn and have two daughters, Regine and Monika. He was strongly influenced by his membership in the Protestant free church community. Schwarz is known to be very protective of his privacy, to an extent that no media recordings of Schwarz exist, and he refuses any kind of interview. Meanwhile, very few unique photos of him are known to exist in the press or in the image search of Google.
