= Renate Reimann-Haas =

Austrian-German entrepreneur

- Born: 8 October 1951 (age 73); Germany
- Citizenship: German; Austrian
- Spouse: married
- Children: 3

Renate Reimann-Haas (born 8 October 1951) is a German-Austrian entrepreneur and heiress who owns a quarter of JAB Holding Company.

== Life and career ==
Reimann-Haas is the great-great-granddaughter of Karl Ludwig Reimann and comes from the wealthy entrepreneurial family Reimann. She is the oldest biological daughter of Albert Reimann from his illegitimate relationship with Emilie Landecker (1922-2017). In 1965, she was adopted by Albert together with her two siblings Wolfgang Reimann and Andrea Reimann-Ciardelli.

In 1984, Reimann-Haas inherited 11.1% of Joh. A. Benckiser GmbH from her father, which in 1999 merged with the British listed company Reckitt & Colman to form Reckitt Benckiser. In 2005, together with her brother Wolfgang and her half-siblings Stefan Reimann-Andersen and Matthias Reimann-Andersen, she founded the non-profit Benckiser Stiftung Zukunft. In 2019, as a result of the family's involvement with the Nazi regime, the foundation was transferred to the Alfred Landecker Foundation based in Berlin.

Reiman-Haas holds a doctorate in chemistry and worked in the organic chemistry department at the Max Planck Institute for Medical Research with Heinz A. Staab in Heidelberg until the mid-2000s. Together, they published several specialist articles in the journal Angewandte Chemie.

== Personal life ==
At her former place of residence in Laudenbach, Reimann-Haas was briefly chairwoman of the Musikverein Laudenbach e.V. and played the clarinet in the BigBand, but otherwise lived an inconspicuous life. There are almost no interviews and photos of her.

Reimann-Haas is married and has three children, Evelin, Susanne and Martin Haas. In 2006, she acquired Austrian citizenship and has not lived in Germany since. Forbes estimated her net worth at $3.9 billion in 2021.
