= Rudolf Gelpke =

Swiss scholar of Islamic studies, translator and drug researcher

Rudolf Gelpke (1928–1972) was a Swiss Islamic scholar.

He studied at the University of Basel, where he received his doctorate in Islamic Studies in 1957. Later Gelpke moved to Iran, where he taught at the University of Tehran and afterwards at the University of Bern in Switzerland. Between September 1962 and May 1963, he taught as associate professor at UCLA.

In the eight years he lived in Tehran, he also worked as a freelance writer, who not only translated historical and literary works, but also published his own works. In his paper, “On Travels in the Universe of the Soul”, he reported on self experimentation using lysergic acid diethylamide (LSD) and psilocybin that he had conducted with his friends Albert Hofmann, pharmacologist Heribert Konzett, and writer Ernst Jünger. In 1966 he published a book about these self experiments called Vom Rausch im Orient und Okzident (On Inebriation in the East and the West).

After returning to Switzerland, he suffered a stroke and died in 1972 at the age of 43.

== See also ==
- Layla and Majnun
