= Kaufland =

German multinational hypermarket chain owned by Schwarz Group

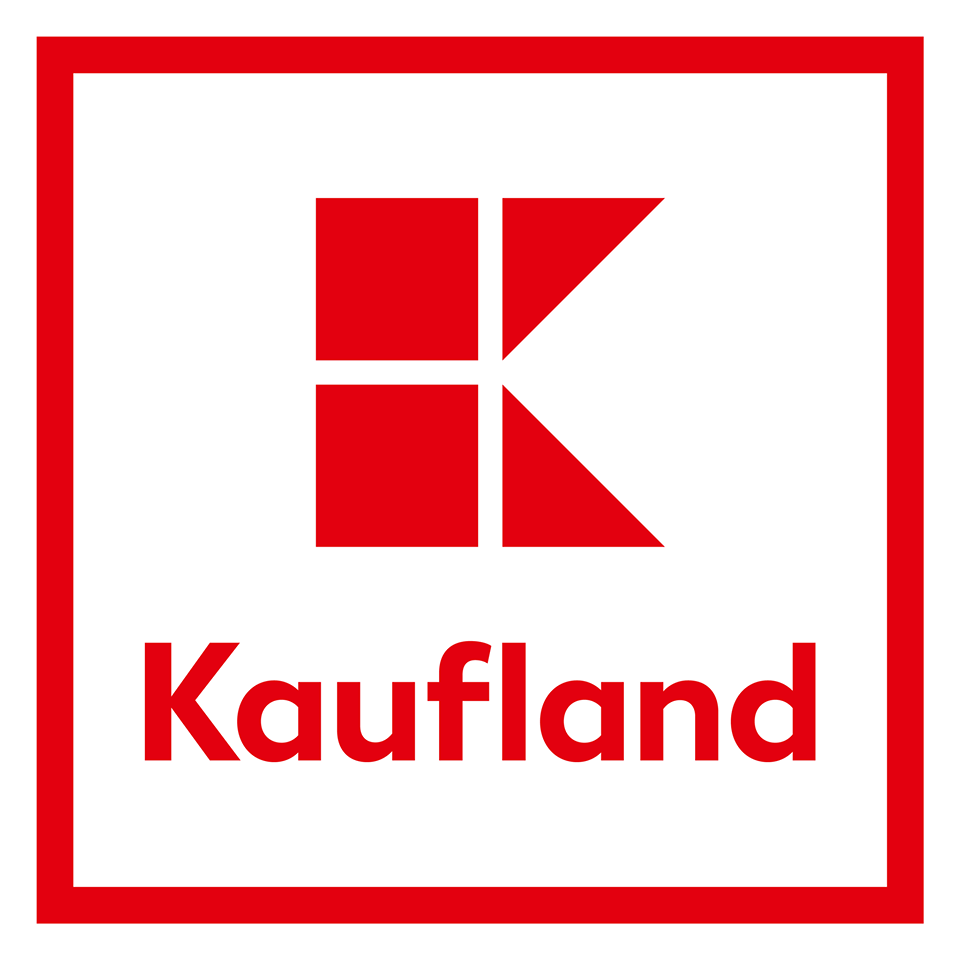
- Type: Private
- Industry: Retail
- Founded: 1984; 42 years ago
- Headquarters: Neckarsulm, Germany
- Number of locations: 1,654 (2025)
- Area served: Germany, Bulgaria, Croatia, Czech Republic, Moldova, Poland, Romania, Slovakia
- Products: Hypermarkets
- Revenue: € 36,7 billion (2025/26)
- Number of employees: 157,000 (2024)
- Parent: Schwarz Gruppe
- Website: www.kaufland.com

Kaufland ([ˈkaʊ̯flant]) is a German hypermarket business, part of the Schwarz Gruppe which also owns Lidl. The hypermarket directly translates to English as "buy-land." It opened its first store in 1984 in Neckarsulm and quickly expanded to become a major chain in what was formerly West Germany. It operates over 1,650 stores in Germany, Croatia, Czechia, Slovakia, Poland, Romania, Bulgaria and Moldova.

== History ==
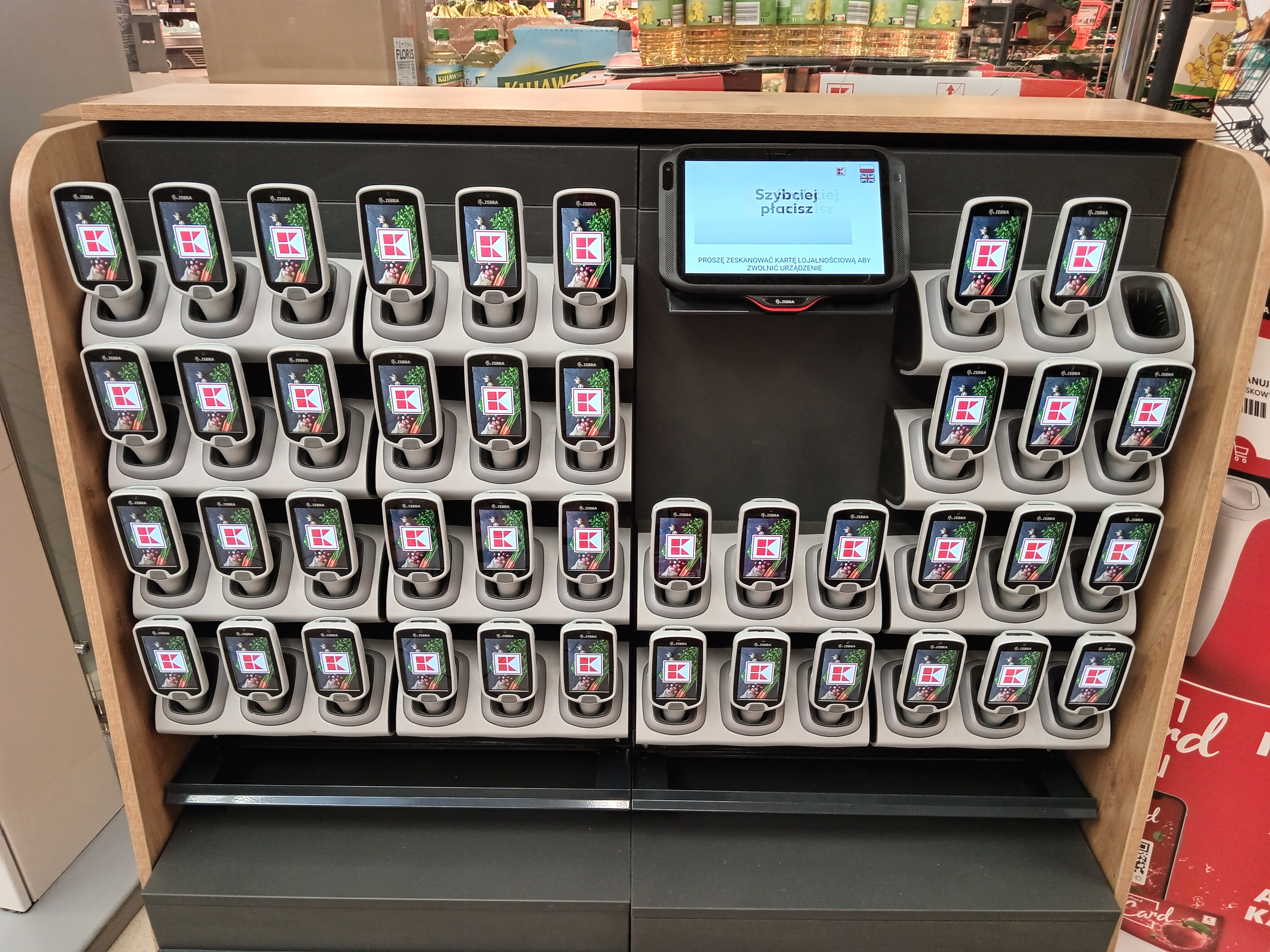
Scanners for customers of the Kaufland in Poland

The history of Kaufland began when Joseph Schwarz entered the Südfrüchte Großhandlung Lidl & Co. company as a shareholder in 1930, which was then renamed Lidl & Schwarz KG. The company expanded its range from fruit to a food and goods wholesaler for the Heilbronn-Franken region.

During World War II, along with the city of Heilbronn, the company was destroyed and needed rebuilding. Within ten years, the company was rebuilt and, in 1954, moved into its own property in Heilbronn in addition to joining the A & O retail chain (today: Markant). With Handels- und Fruchthof Heilbronn GmbH the first regional warehouse was opened in northern Württemberg. In 1964, the company expanded its range of products by opening a meat department.

In 1968, Lidl & Schwarz opened the first Handelshof discount store in Backnang, and in 1977 at the same place a hypermarket of the same name was established. Following the US self-service market structure, a 1000 m² facility was opened, with an employee base of 70 individuals.

After the death of Joseph Schwarz in 1977 his son Dieter Schwarz took over the management of the company. Taking the name of his father's former business partner, he introduced the Lidl chain which were primarily discount stores and quickly expanded the range of stores business into 30 locations. As an alternative to these stores, he developed Kaufland. In 1984 the first Kaufland hypermarket was opened in Neckarsulm, where the corporate headquarters had been located since 1972.

After the reunification of Germany the Kaufland chain expanded into the Eastern German states and opened numerous markets. The first East German Kaufland store was opened in Meissen in 1990. In 1998, the first department store outside of Germany was established in Kladno, Czech Republic. In the 2000s, the company established branches in Slovakia (since 2000), Croatia (2001), Poland (2001), Romania (2005), Bulgaria (2006) and Moldova (2018).

In 2006 and 2007, other store openings followed in Germany and Kaufland also took over shares of competitors. In February 2009 the corporation claimed to have 73,000 employees in Germany.

In January 2010, it was announced that Karl Lupus GmbH & Co. KG was cleared by antitrust authorities to sell their 12 stores of the famila Handels-Betriebe GmbH & Co. KG Rhein-Neckar and the Cash-&-Carry-Markt Lupus Food Service with 1,400 employees to Kaufland.

In January 2010, the Kaufland group had purchased all five Schleckerland drug stores in Ehingen, Geislingen, Tempe, Neu-Ulm, Schwäbisch Gmünd and all but the Neu-Ulm store had been converted to the Kaufland brand by then. The local Schleckerland was closed down because Kaufland was already present in Neu-Ulm.

From 2011 onward, all Handelshof stores were to be gradually converted to the Kaufland brand and to be partly rebuilt and enlarged.

In November 2016, Kaufland's parent company applied for Kaufland trademarks in Australia. In September 2019, Kaufland announced plans to open 20 stores in Australia. In January 2020, Kaufland announced it was abandoning its expansion plans for Australia, two years after buying its first store and six months after starting work on its distribution centre. It had invested about 310 million euro and hired over 200 staff members but never opened a store. The first stores were originally expected to open in 2019 but the launch date had been pushed back to 2021.

On 26 September 2019, the first two Moldovan stores were opened in the capital city of Chișinău. Construction of the fourth Moldovan store started on 23 July 2020, in the southern city of Comrat. The beginning of construction at the fifth Moldovan store in the city of Ungheni was announced on 6 October 2020.

In 2021, the company announced its 2030 decarbonisation strategy, in partnership with DHL maritime transport. The strategy explained plans to produce 80 percent less carbon dioxide by the year 2030 by saving 12,000 tons of CO_{2} each year, with the use of sustainable marine fuel in all maritime transport of Kaufland products.

== Operations ==
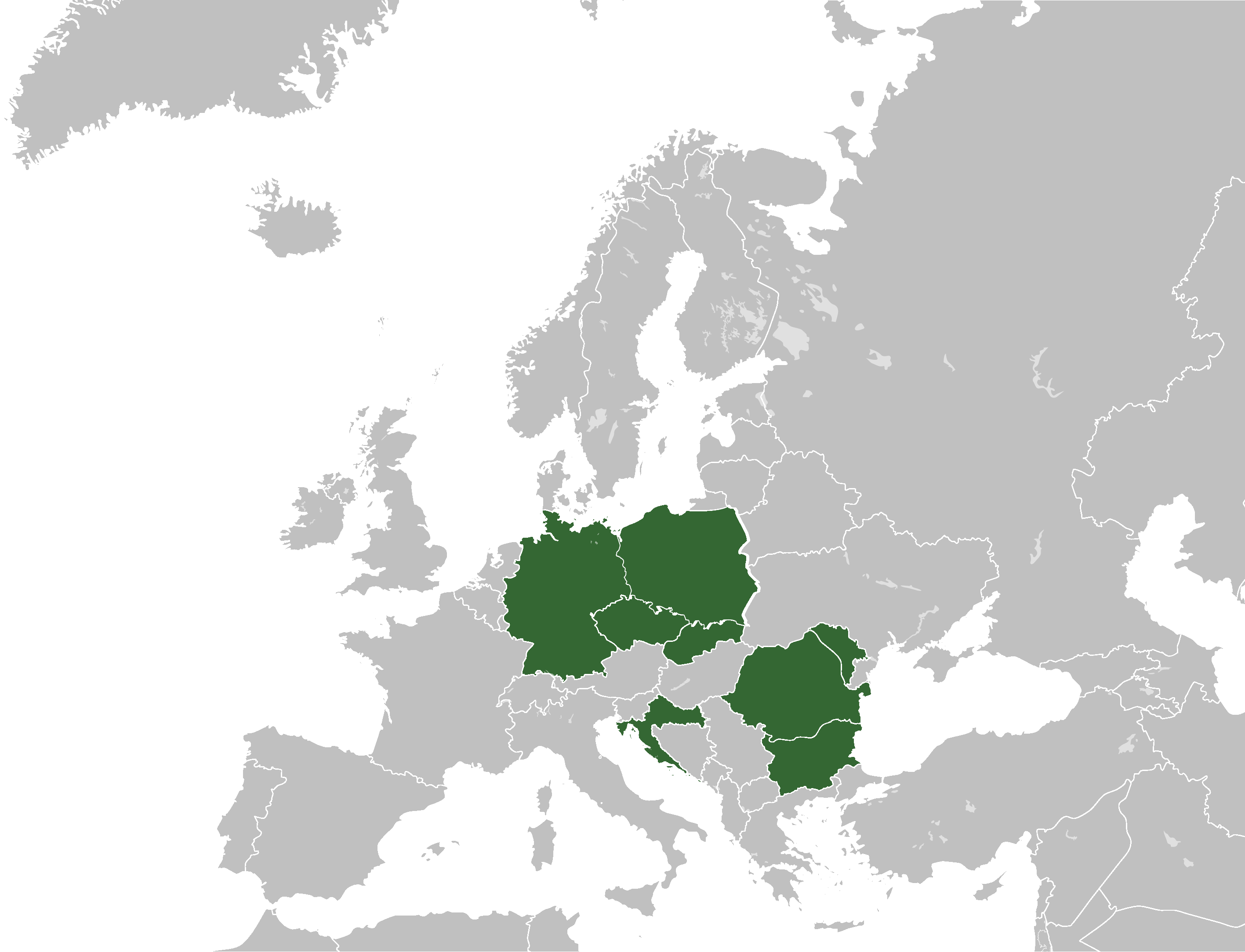
European countries in which Kaufland is active

Country	Year opened	Number of stores	State of the data	Ref.
Bulgaria	2006	72	October 2026	
Croatia	2001	54	November 2026	
Czech Republic	1998	149	October 2026	
Germany	1984	821	May 2026	
Moldova	2018	9	October 2026	
Poland	2001	264	May 2026	
Romania	2005	207	October 2026	
Slovakia	2000	88	October 2026	
Total		1,654		

== Products ==
With an inventory averaging 30,000 items , Kaufland provides a diverse selection of food and goods for daily needs. Alongside products from various manufacturer brands, Kaufland also offers its own brands, including Kaufland Mobile among others.

Since 1994, Kaufland has operated its own bakeries. Kaufland expanded its product range to include Demeter products starting from November 2018, catering to consumers seeking organic and biodynamic options.

The company maintains its own meat processing facilities located in Möckmühl, Osterfeld, Heilbronn, and Heiligenstadt, as well as in Říčany, Czech Republic. These facilities enable Kaufland to oversee the production process and maintain high standards of quality across its meat products.

== Gallery ==
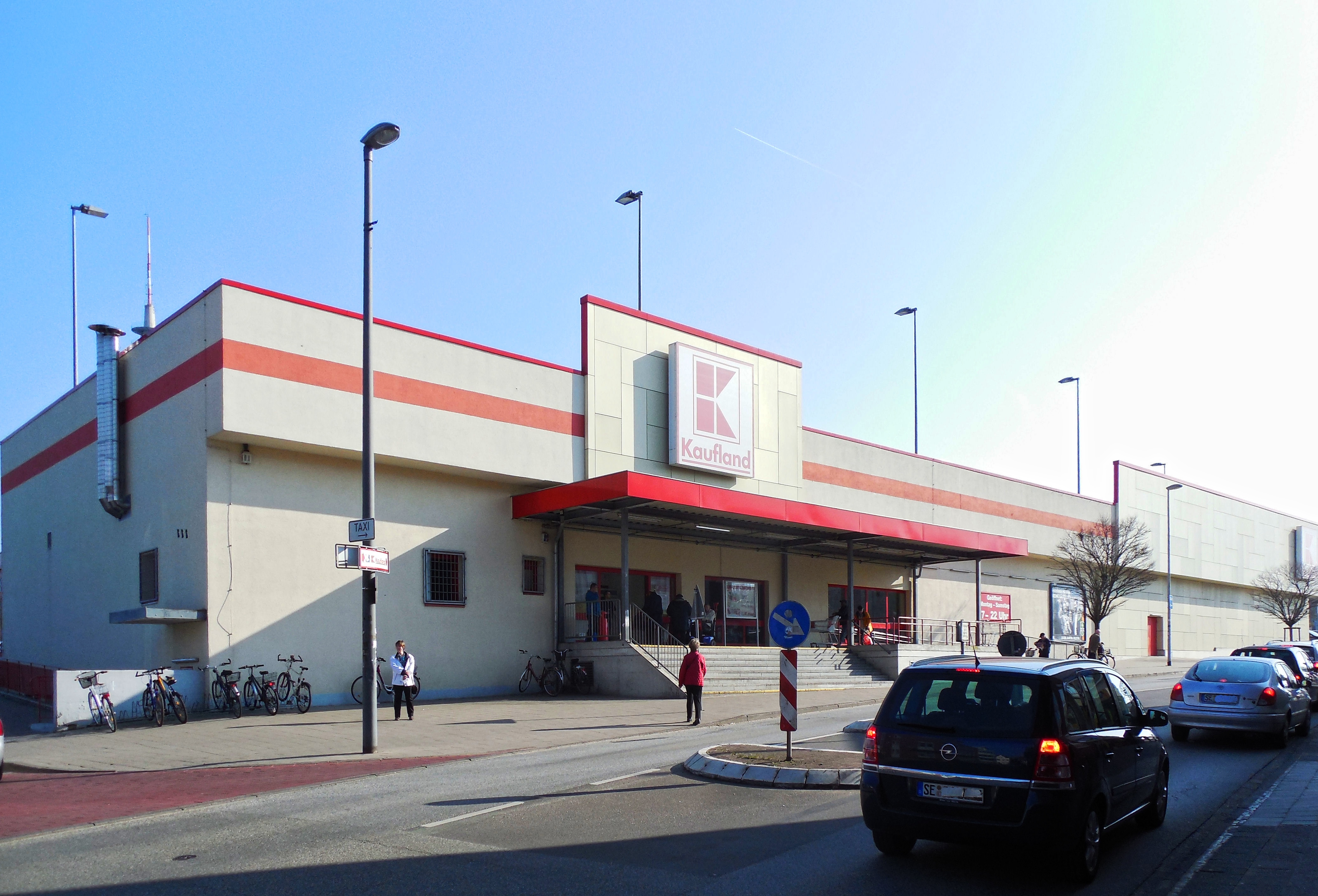
Kaufland store in Bad Segeberg, Germany

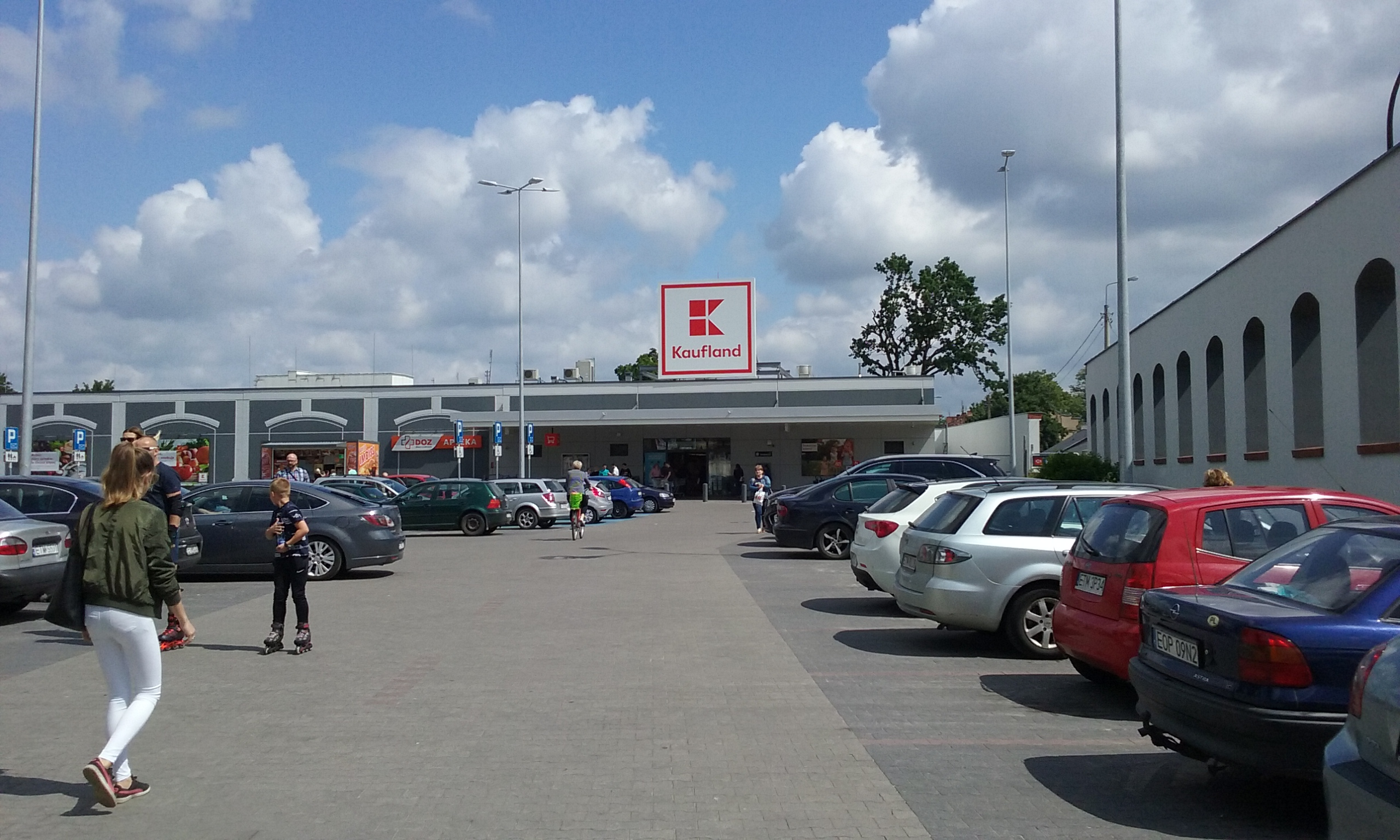
Kaufland in Tomaszow Mazowiecki, Poland

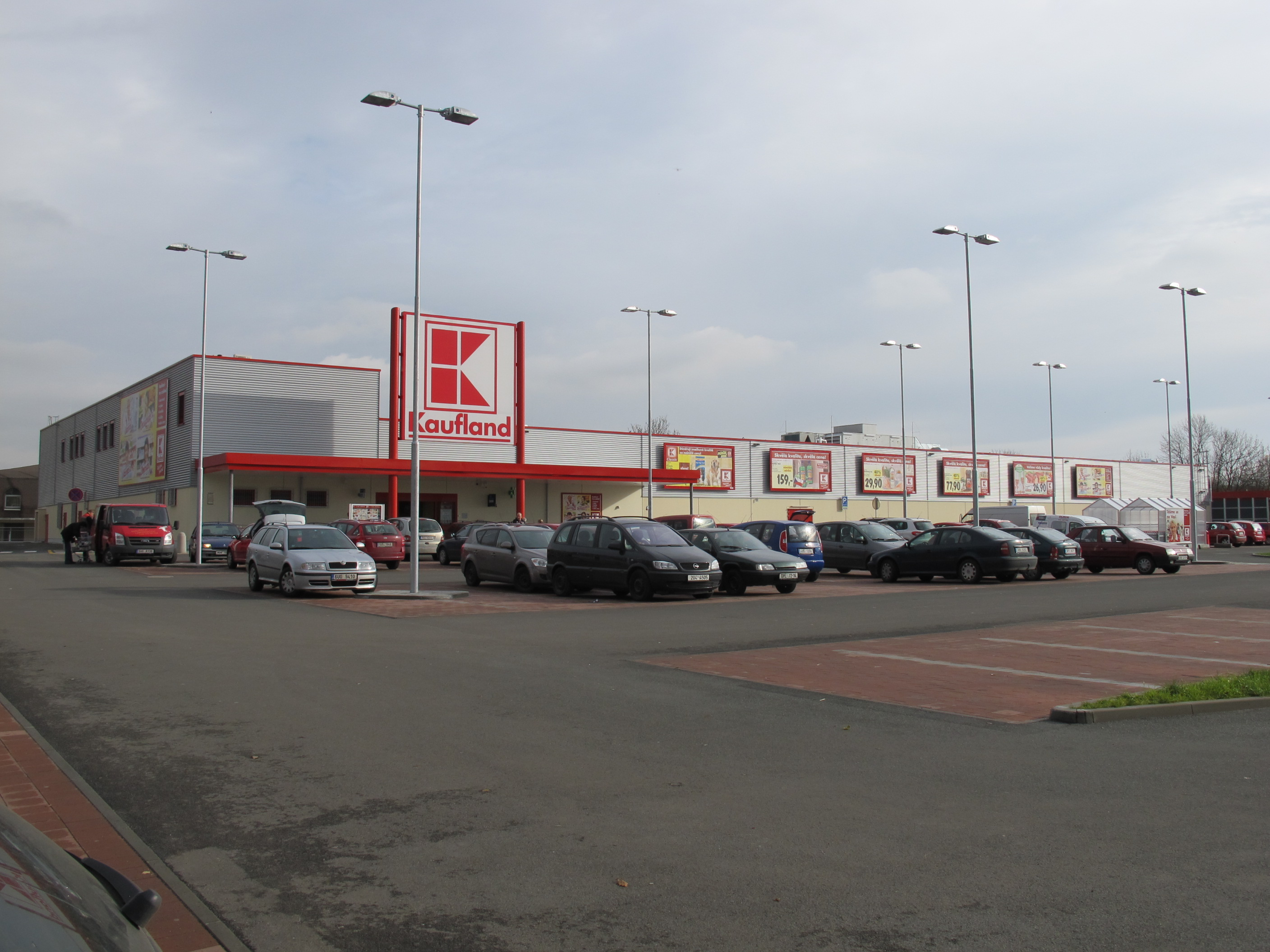
Kaufland in Litvínov, Czech Republic

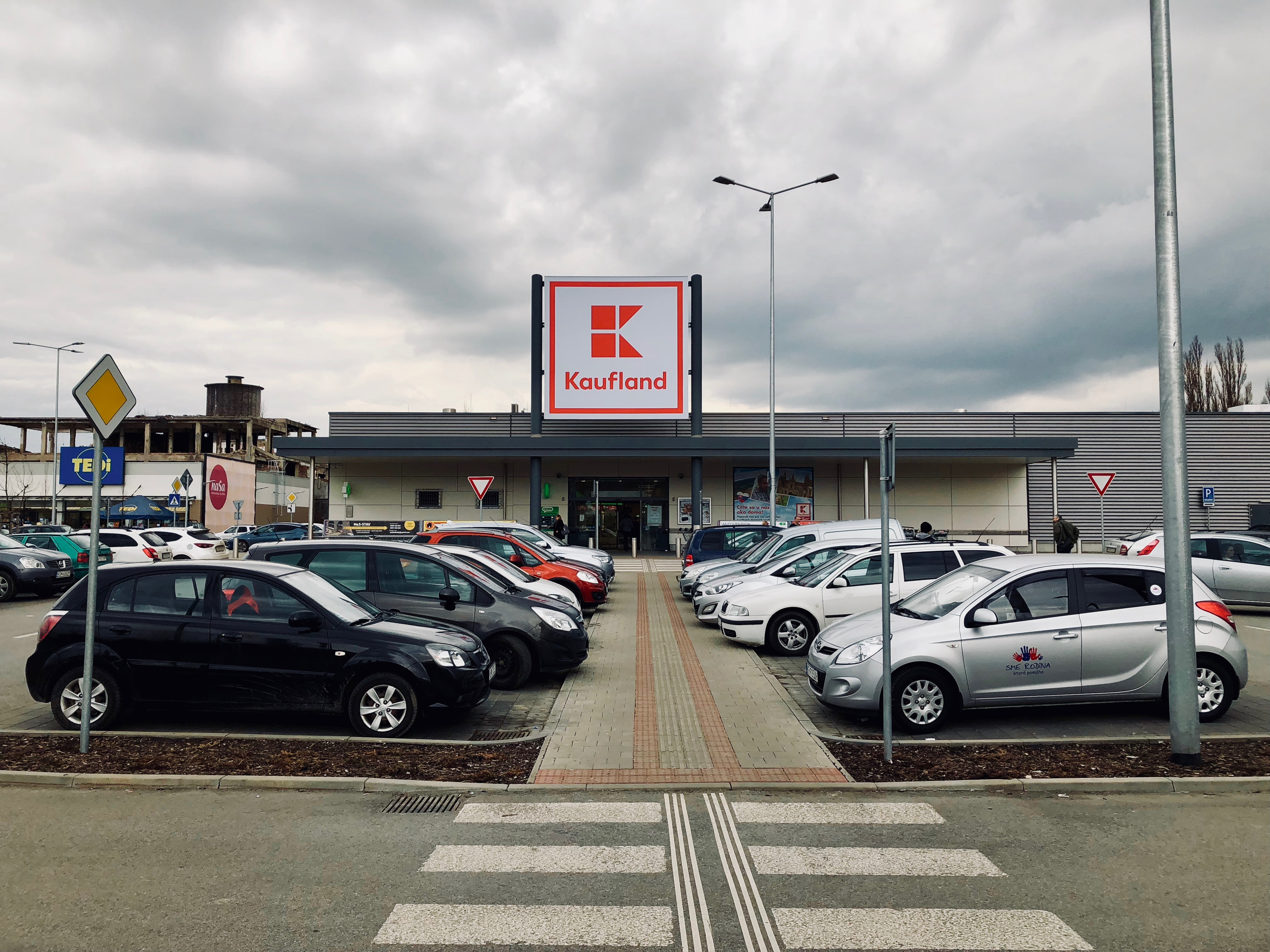
Kaufland in Košice, Slovakia

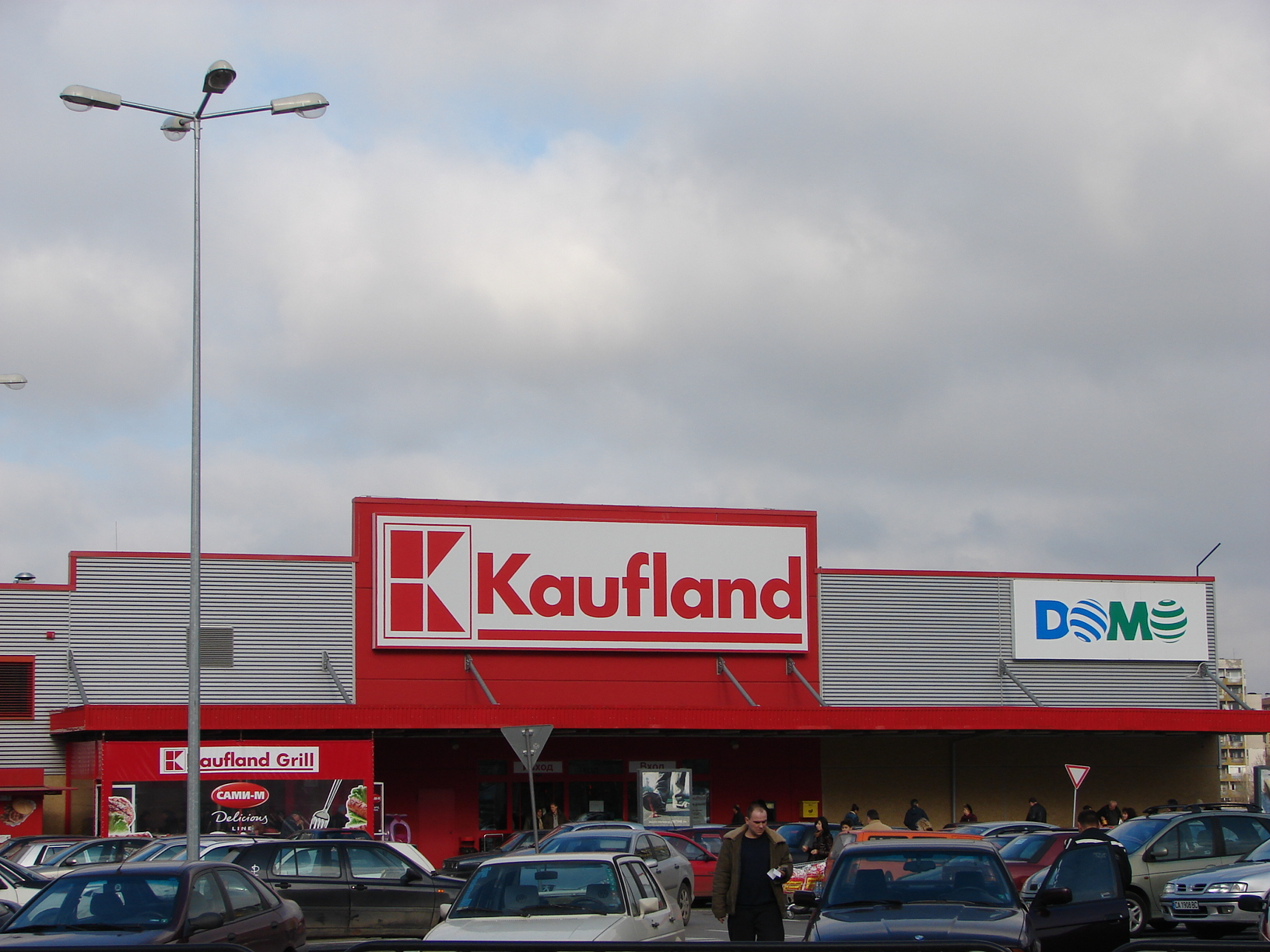
Kaufland in Sofia, Bulgaria

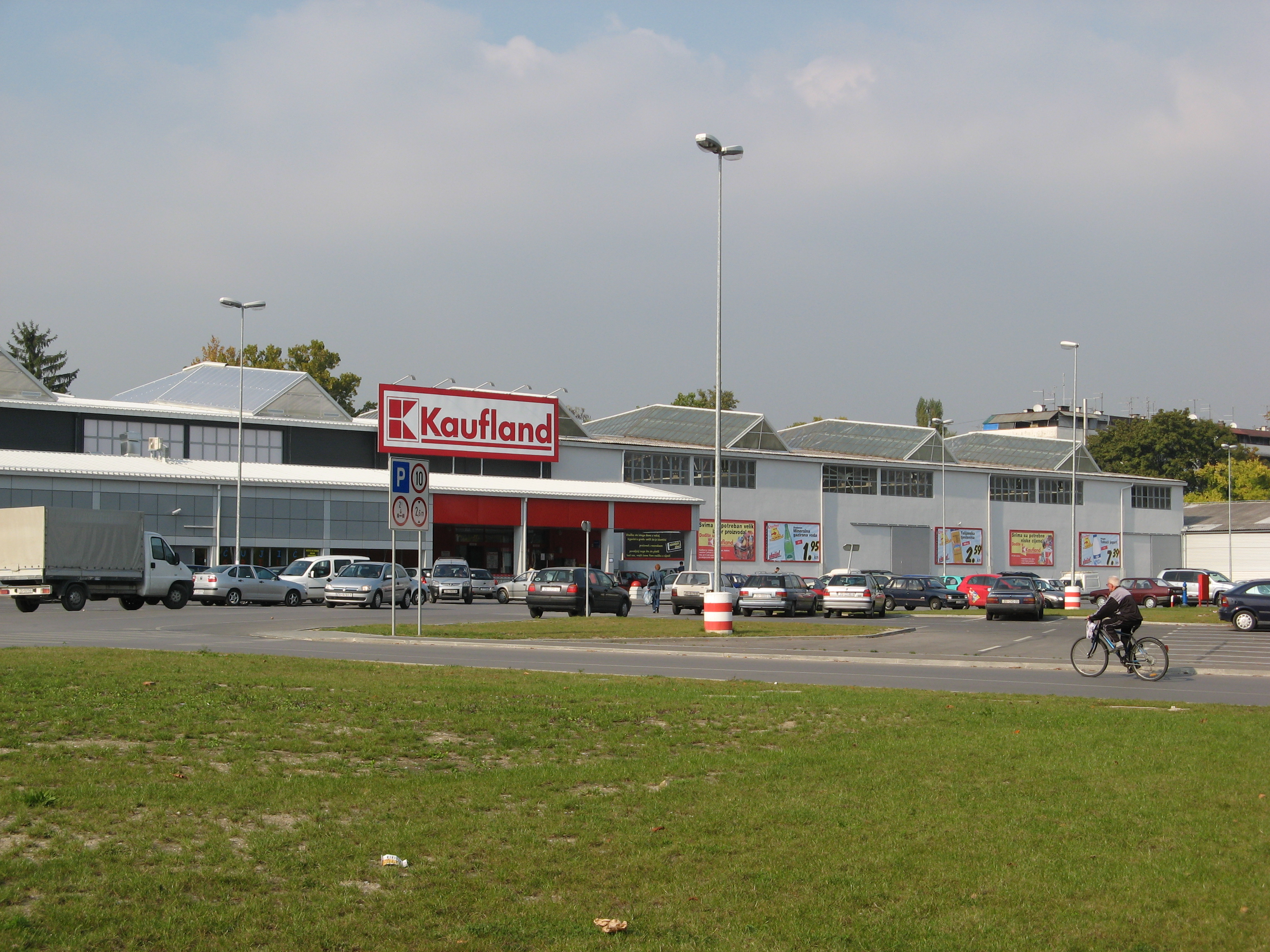
Kaufland in Zagreb, Croatia

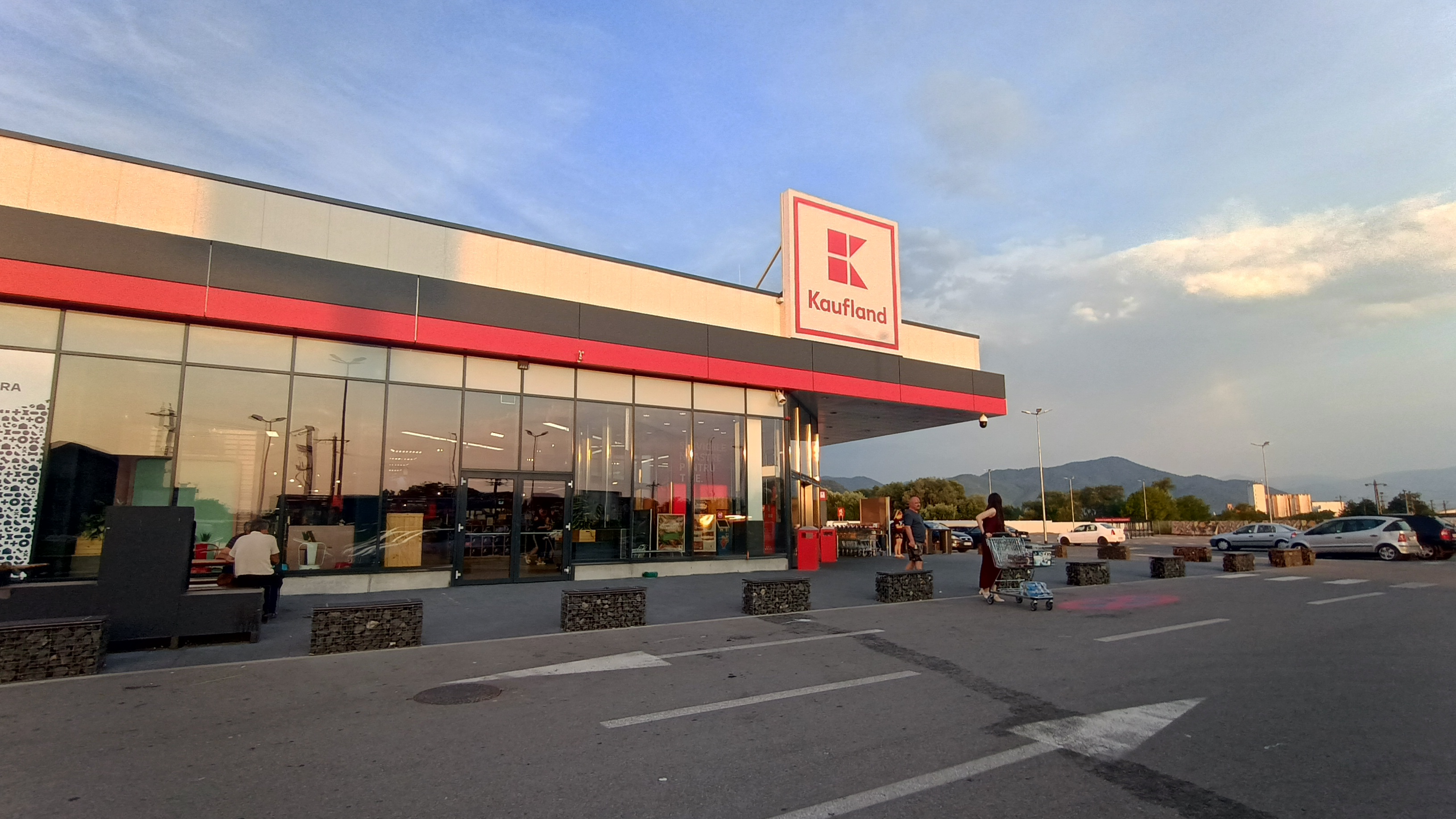
Kaufland in Hațeg, Romania
