= Schwarz Group =

German retailer conglomerate

- Logo of Schwarz Group with various retailer brands
- Native name: Schwarz-Gruppe
- Type: Private
- Industry: Retail
- Founded: 1930; 96 years ago
- Founder: Josef Schwarz
- Headquarters: Neckarsulm, Germany
- Area served: Europe and U.S.
- Brands: Lidl; Kaufland
- Revenue: €185.6 billion (US$209.48 billion) (FY 2025)
- Owner: Dieter Schwarz
- Number of employees: 604,000 (FY 2025)
- Website: gruppe.schwarz/en

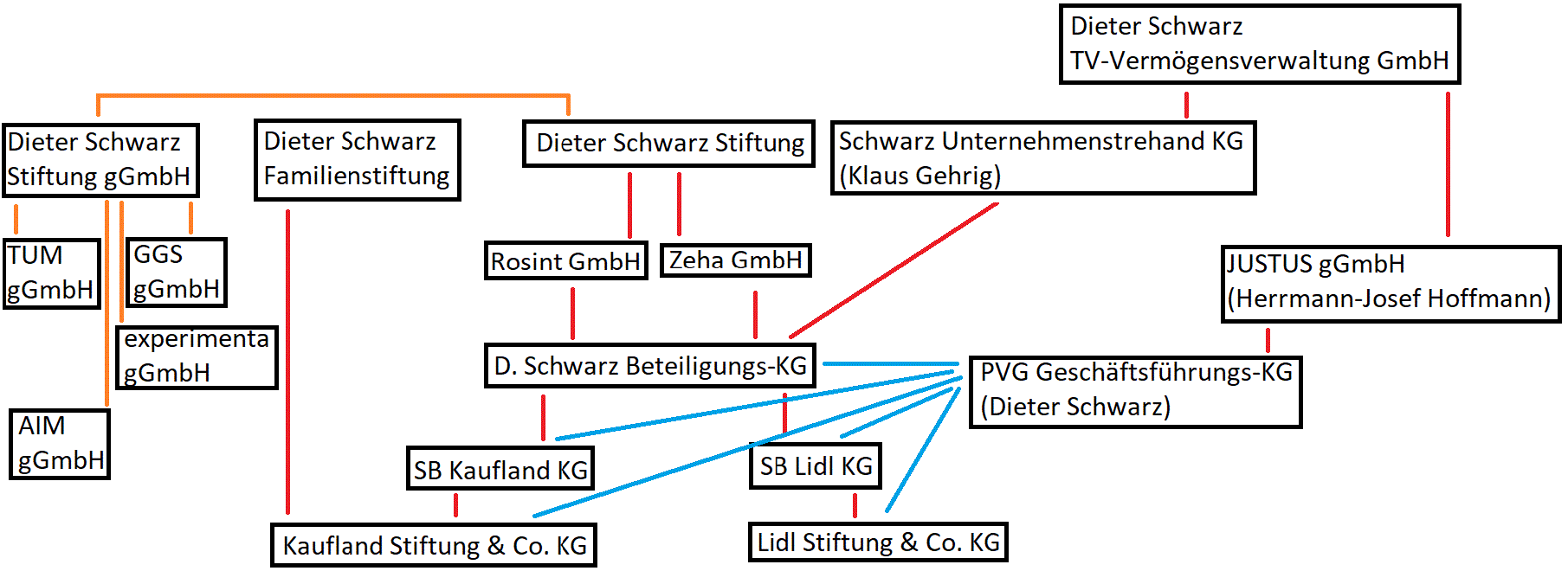
Shareholdings within the Schwarz Group

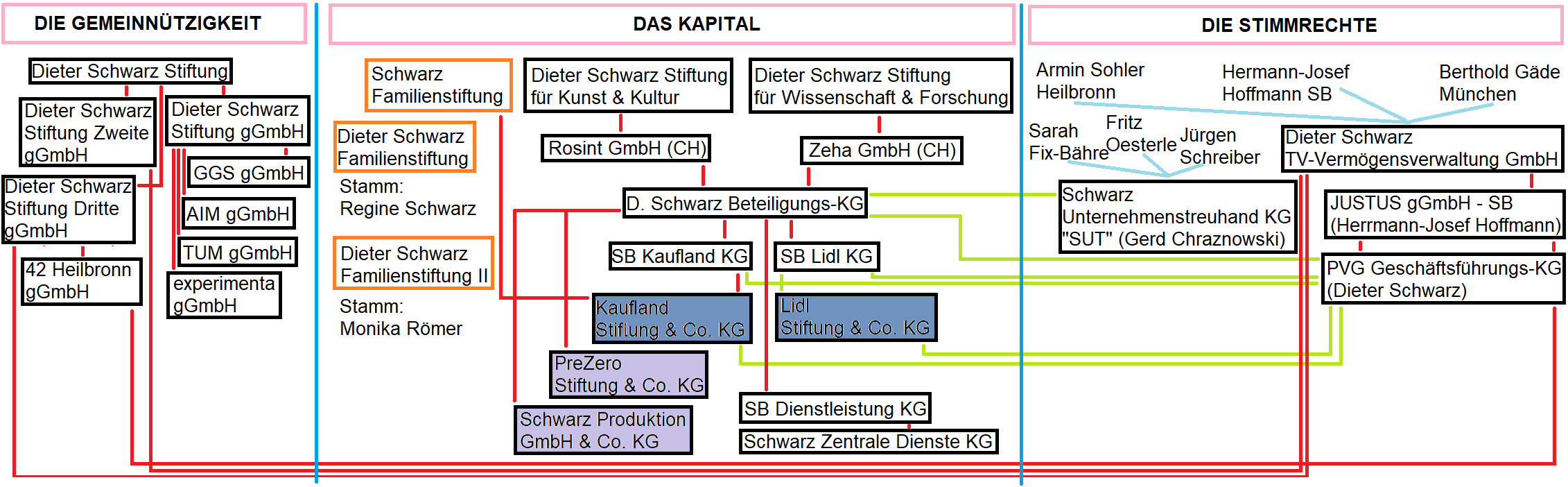
2021

The Schwarz Group (German: Schwarz Gruppe) is a German multinational retailer that operates stores under the Lidl and Kaufland brands. With revenues of €185.6 billion in fiscal year 2025, Schwarz Group is the largest European retailer and the fourth-largest retailer in the world by revenue. The Schwarz Group's stores sell mostly private label brands, and the family-owned group also operates its own production facilities for baked goods, soft drinks and ice cream.

== History ==
The business was founded in 1930 by Josef Schwarz (1903–1977), father of Dieter Schwarz. It is headquartered in Neckarsulm, Baden-Württemberg, Germany. The Schwarz Group is an international trading company with 604,000 employees and operates over 14,500 stores (in 2025) across 33 countries. It is made up of three retail divisions, LD Stiftung and Lidl Stiftung & Co. KG (which trade stores under the Lidl brand) and Kaufland.

In addition to the retail business, the Schwarz Group also owns brands in the beverage, baked goods, sweets and ice cream sectors. The Schwarz Group has been involved in the collection, sorting and recycling of recyclable materials for many years. With the Dieter Schwarz Foundation, the company supports education, primarily in Dieter Schwarz's hometown of Heilbronn.

== Operating structure ==
The operational business of Schwarz Group is spread over five groups of companies.

This structure, often referred to as a conglomerate, is not a corporation under commercial law. As such, no consolidated balance sheet is produced. It has an intricate and complex investment structure. A conglomerate, as used colloquially, requires main companies which operate in a diverse range of sectors and are not in competition with each other. This is not the case of the Schwarz Group's main companies, Lidl and Kaufland, which are rival food retailers.

=== Lidl ===
LD Stiftung and Lidl Stiftung & Co. KG are two food retail companies which together operate around 12,000 retail outlets worldwide under the Lidl brand. LD Stiftung operates the stores in Germany and Lidl Stiftung & Co. KG operates the stores everywhere else where Lidl stores are in. Regional warehouse operations and the sizeable real estate business are managed by regional and national branches of the companies respectively. Tailwind Shipping Lines, a container shipping provider, is a subsidiary of the business.

=== Kaufland ===
Kaufland Stiftung & Co. KG is a food retailer with operating approximately 1,600 branches. The regional warehouses and real estate business fall under the regional and national companies while the five meat processing plants are operated as separate subsidiaries.

=== Schwarz-Produktion ===
Schwarz Produktion Stiftung & Co. KG is a food production company specialising in the manufacture of private-label products for the Lidl and Kaufland supermarket chains. They also produce a limited quantity of goods for third parties. Their operations include the reuse, recycling and production of new plastic beverage bottles.

=== PreZero ===
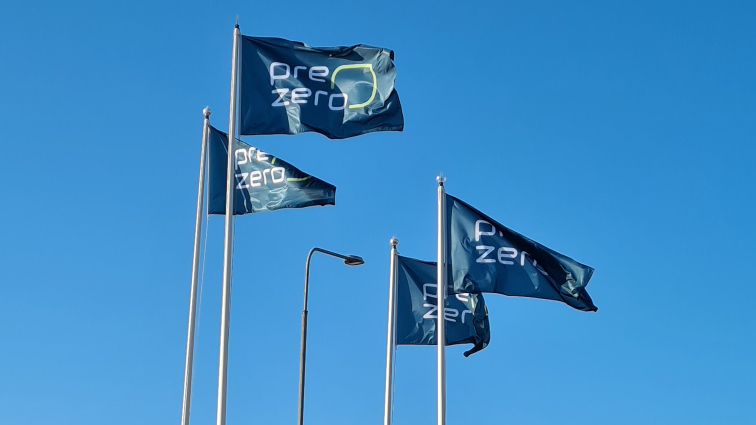
PreZero logo

Prezero Stiftung & Co. KG is a global environmental service provider specializing in waste management and recycling, with a strong presence across Europe and the United States through its extensive network of 430 locations. While primarily serving the waste disposal needs of entities within the Schwarz Group, such as Lidl and Kaufland, Prezero also engages with external clients, offering tailored waste management solutions to a diverse range of third-party businesses. In 2021 Prezero acquired the Suez Environment waste disposal and recycling operations in The Netherlands, Luxembourg, Germany, and Poland.

=== Schwarz Digits ===
In 2021, Schwarz acquired Israeli cyber security company XM Cyber. In 2023, Schwarz established the Schwarz Digits division, offering cloud computing services, operating under the STACKIT brand. The cloud service was born out of internal needs of the retail business, but was opened up to external customers following sharp growth and a market demand for non-US cloud services. Schwarz also holds a minority stake in Aleph Alpha, a German AI startup.
