= Stefan Reimann-Andersen =

German billionaire businessman

- Born: 13 July 1963 (age 62)

Stefan Reimann-Andersen (born 13 July 1963) is an Austrian-German entrepreneur. Together with three of his siblings, they own 95% of Luxembourg-based investment firm JAB Holding Company.

Stefan Reimann-Andersen was born in the family of Albert Reimann, the owner of the chemical company Joh. A. Benckiser. However, none of eight siblings knew that their father was rich until his death in 1984. The JAB Holding Company produces such cleanings products as Sagrotan, Vanish or Calgonit, Jacobs coffee, Senseo pads, shoes from Bally or leather jackets from Belstaff. The family prefers to avoid publicity and live in anonymity. In 2006, they moved from Ludwigshafen to Vienna and then to Luxembourg.

Stefan Reimann-Andersen made the 2022 Forbes Billionaires List with an estimated wealth of $5.8 billion and occupied the 438th position.
