= Deichmann SE =

German multinational footwear retailer

DEICHMANN Shoes
- Type: Societas Europaea
- Founded: 1913; 113 years ago
- Headquarters: Essen
- Key people: Heinrich Deichmann (CEO)
- Products: Shoes, Bags
- Revenue: ~€8.9 Billion EUR (2025)
- Number of employees: 50,000 (2025)
- Website: www.deichmann.com

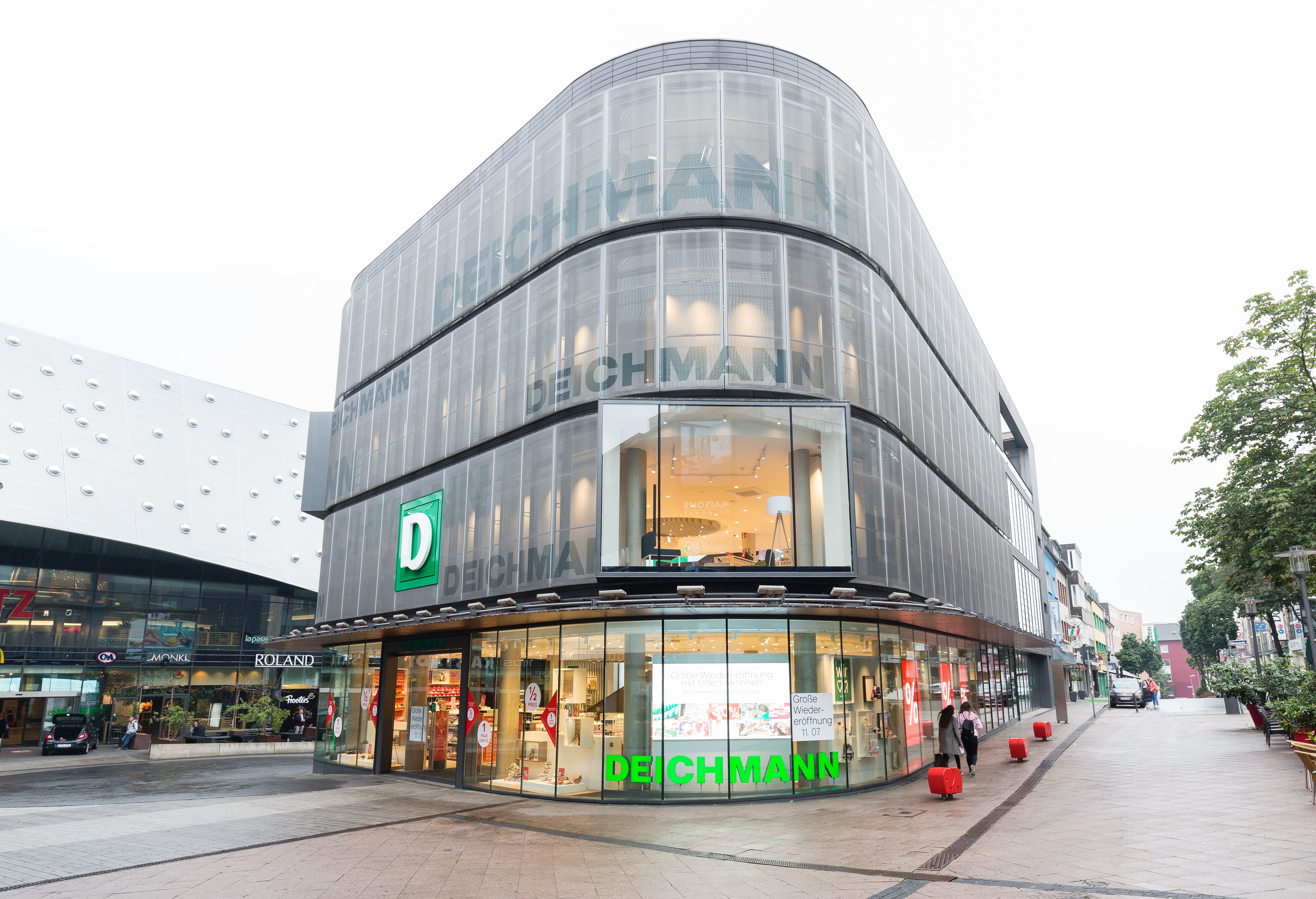
Deichmann flagship store in Essen, Germany

Deichmann SE is one of Europe's largest footwear retailers and is headquartered in Essen, Germany.

== Company structure ==
Deichmann SE is a wholly-owned family company. The group also includes Snipes SE. In Switzerland, the company is still called Dosenbach, founded in 1865 by Franziska Dosenbach and acquired by Deichmann in 1973, and van Haren in the Netherlands and Belgium.

== History ==
=== Founding years 1913–1940 ===
Heinrich Deichmann, born in 1888, opened a shoemaker's shop in 1913 at the age of 25 on what is now Johannes-Brokamp-Straße in Borbeck, which was incorporated into the city of Essen two years later. At first, his customers were mainly miners from the then up-and-coming Ruhr area who needed inexpensive shoe repairs, being part of the lower income bracket. After World War I, Deichmann and his shoemakers produced their own shoes for the first time. Soon afterwards, Heinrich Deichmann bought cheap new goods from shoe factories to resell them to his own customers. Heinrich Deichmann opened his first large shoe shop at Borbeck Market in 1936. His wife, Julie, took over the business after his death in 1940.

=== After World War II ===
After World War II, Deichmann made 50,000 pairs of shoes out of poplar wood and parachute harnesses. In addition, a swap shop was set up for used shoes, which grew to 5,000 customers on file. Early on, their son Heinz-Horst Deichmann helped out in the company, opening the first shop outside Essen on Ackerstraße in Düsseldorf in the late 1940s. He studied theology, received his doctorate in medicine and continued to run the small family business together with his mother. He gave up his career as a doctor in 1956 to fully take over the management of the shoe business, buying out his four older sisters. By 1963, the company was operating 16 shops along the Rhine and in the Ruhr. Under Heinz-Horst Deichmann's management, the company formed a significant part of the German and European shoe retail trade. Deichmann introduced display stands and later the rack-room concept in Germany, where shoes are presented in boxes for customers to try on directly.

=== International expansion and acquisitions ===
The company acquired the Dosenbach shoe chain in Switzerland in 1973, followed by shoe and sports chain Ochsner in 1992. The two chains were merged to form Dosenbach-Ochsner. Their names are still used today for the branches located in Switzerland. The company expanded to the USA in 1984, the Netherlands in 1985, Austria in 1992 and Poland in 1997. Heinz-Horst Deichmann's son Heinrich Otto took over as chairman of the board in 1999. His sisters do not work for the company. In 2001, branches were opened in Hungary and the United Kingdom. This was followed by Denmark and the Czech Republic in 2003, Slovakia in 2004, Slovenia and Turkey in 2006, Romania in 2007 and Bulgaria in 2009. Germany's thousandth branch was opened in 2006. The company was legally changed to a Societas Europaea company on 1 January 2010 and Deichmann opened its first stores in France and Belgium in 2017. The group had a total of 4,700 branches worldwide in 2025.

In the US, Deichmann SE acquired the KicksUSA chain in 2018 with over 60 stores in the streetwear and athletic shoe sector. In 2019, Deichmann opened its first branches in Estonia, Latvia and Dubai.

Deichmann set up its first online shop in 2000. The company currently runs around 40 online shops internationally and is working to expand its omnichannel concept.

== Market positioning ==
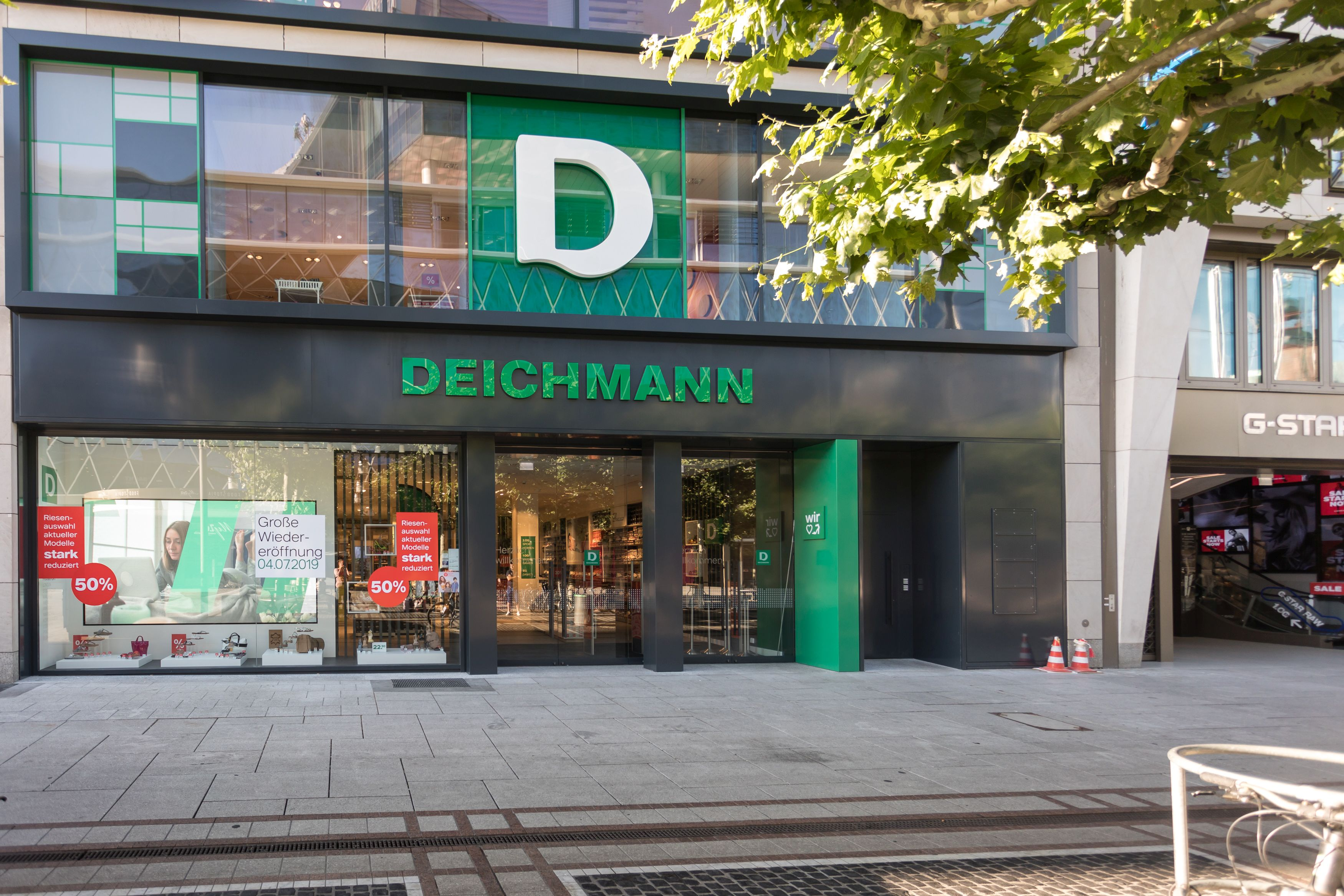
Deichmann store in Frankfurt

In the 2025 financial year, the Deichmann Group sold around 180 million pairs of shoes worldwide, around 30% of them in Germany. As of 31 December 2025, it employed over 50,000 people in over 30 countries and is the market leader in European shoe retail.

In May 2005, Deichmann purchased the brands Gallus and Elefanten. Gallus is a shoe factory founded by Mönchengladbach shoemaker Heinrich Vogels in 1880, which was based in Dülken until 1997. The Latin name Gallus goes back to the Hahn family of manufacturers in Göttingen, from whom Heinrich Vogels acquired the rights to the brand in the 1930s. Elefanten (based in Kleve) was closed down by English shoe manufacturer Clarks in late 2004 after failing to find a suitable investor. Since then, shoes that Deichmann purchases from suppliers have been sold under the brand names Elefanten and Gallus. Deichmann does not produce its own shoes, instead purchasing shoes in about 40 countries. Its primary purchasing market is Asia.

In addition to its own brands, Deichmann also offers third-party brands, such as well-known sports brands.

=== Brand Ambassadors ===
The Pussycat Dolls collaborated with Deichmann on advertisements, starting in March 2006. Extreme athlete and musician Joey Kelly appeared in advertising for Deichmann's Victory brand of running shoes. The Sugababes collection was released in the spring of 2008, with their song "Denial" used in the campaign's television advertising. American supermodel Cindy Crawford brought her own shoe collection to market for Deichmann under the 5th Avenue label in 2009. Halle Berry appeared in advertising for Deichmann in 2012. Sylvie Meis presented her first Deichmann shoe collection in 2015, with additional collections released in 2016 and 2017. Ellie Goulding also released her own collection for Deichmann in 2017. Deichmann collaborated with singer Rita Ora to release a collection of 40 women's shoe designs in 2019. In 2022 and 2023 Deichmann launched the "Fila meets Leni Klum" campaign with model Leni Klum, and collaborated with Spanish singer Nia as brand ambassador in the iberian territory.

Dosenbach took over the title sponsorship of Switzerland’s second-tier football league for one season, which was called the Dosenbach Challenge League during that time.

== Public perception ==
=== 2003: Founding member of the amfori BSCI (Business Social Compliance Initiative) ===
Deichmann is a member of the BSCI. More than 2,400 retailers and companies from 46 countries are part of the initiative. They pursue common goals, including improving working conditions in factories, helping suppliers adapt to national laws and international guidelines, and facilitating socially responsible behaviour in the globalised economy.

=== 2012–2014: Chromium (VI) trioxide pollution ===
According to RAPEX, the EU rapid alert system for unsafe consumer products and consumer protection, there were multiple reports of leather shoes produced under the company's own 5th Avenue brand being contaminated by chromium trioxide between 2012 and 2014.

=== 2018: Member of the cads association ===
Deichmann SE is a member of the cads association (cooperation for assuring defined standards for shoe and leather goods production). In 2018, the initiative, which was launched in 2007, became a registered association with some 80 members. These include companies from the footwear and leather goods industry, brands, retailers, test laboratories and chemical manufacturers. The cads is committed to sustainable development in the footwear and leather goods industry along the entire value chain. All members agree to abide by jointly defined production and environmental standards.

=== Member of the Leather Working Group ===
Deichmann SE is a member of the Leather Working Group, which was founded in 2005. The multi-stakeholder initiative brings together brands, manufacturers, retailers and leading technical experts from the leather industry and non-governmental organisations. Its goal is to make the production chain in leather processing more transparent. In addition, it aims to bring about sustainable changes to processing in tanneries and via distributors, including by reducing water and energy consumption. It also calls for occupational health and safety in factories to be monitored using a specially developed audit protocol.

== Social engagement ==
"The company must serve people" was one of Heinz-Horst Deichmann's mottos. He always ensured that this motto was lived out within the company. His son continues this tradition. In addition to charitable commitment through the Deichmann Foundation, the company's employees are offered various benefits. For example, employees have the right to spend one week per year recovering in Switzerland at the company's expense as part of a health week, using their vacation days. With the "Deichmann bewegt" initiative, the company also promotes a wide range of social commitments - including the "Germany's Fittest Elementary School" campaign, the awarding of employees as "motivators" for their voluntary work, and the promotion of swimming projects.

=== Deichmann Foundation ===
The Dr Heinz-Horst Deichmann Foundation promotes various social and welfare-based projects in Germany and other countries. The projects focus on the following fields: child and youth welfare; development aid and development cooperation; emergency aid and disaster relief; art and culture; education, science and research; and health.

The projects receiving support in Germany include Stern im Norden e.V., which provides assistance in the socially deprived area of Dortmund's Nordstadt district. During the COVID-19 pandemic, the Deichman Foundation engaged in multiple initiatives, including donating one million face masks to the Caritas organisation in the Archdiocese of Berlin in May 2020.

=== "wortundtat" foundation ===
Heinz-Horst Deichmann founded the "wortundtat" foundation in 1977. The organisation has maintained DZI Seal of Approval status since 1992 (the DZI is the German Central Institute for Social Issues). The foundation is active in Tanzania, Madagascar, Moldova, Greece and Germany. In collaboration with local partners, people in need receive support in matters relating to education, health, sustainability and emergency aid.

Among others, major projects include:

- Madagascar: Versatile support in one of the poorest countries in the world (project start 2023)
- Moldova: Help for poor segments of the population (project launched in 2007)
- Greece: Help for refugees and poverty-stricken Greeks (project launched in 1980)
- Tanzania: Help for a population group in the south (project launched in 1996)

=== International engagement ===
Deichmann subsidiaries in Hungary, the Czech Republic, Slovakia, Italy, Austria, Poland, the United Kingdom and the United States support numerous social projects in their respective countries. Children's homes, hospices and educational projects receive support, primarily through donations.
