= Stadtseebach =

River in Germany

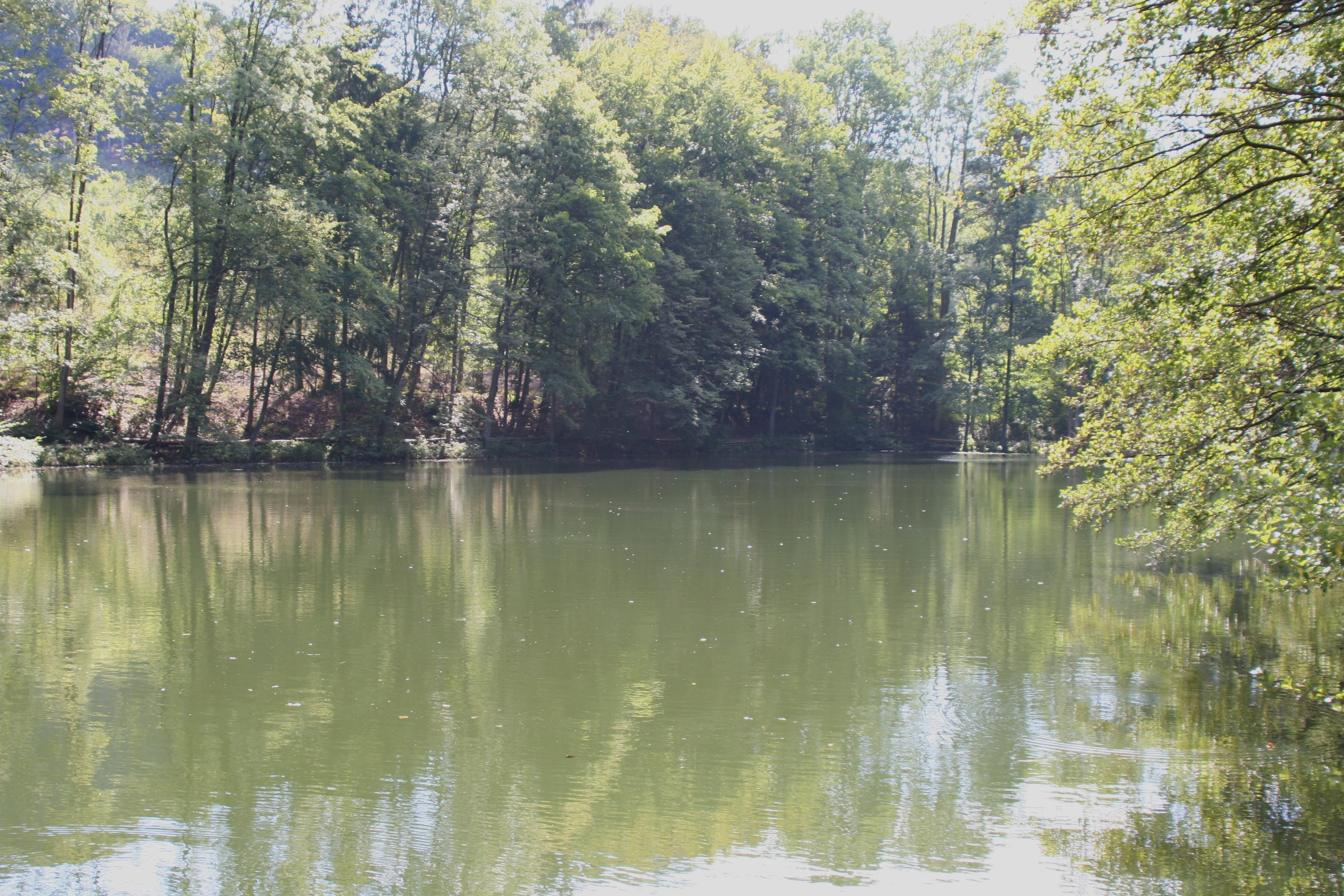

Location
- Country: Germany
- State: Baden-Württemberg

Physical characteristics
- Mouth
  - location: Sulm
  - coordinates: 49.1683°N 9.2676°E

Basin features
- Progression: Sulm→ Neckar→ Rhine→ North Sea

Stadtseebach is a river of Baden-Württemberg, Germany. Another name, however not any longer officially used, is Saubach. It flows into the Sulm in Erlenbach. At the end in the area of Erlenbach it is also called Weinsberger Bach.

== Geology ==
The Stadtseebach rises in the Gipskeuper, just below the Schilfsandstein surface, which forms an escarpment along the northern edge of the Heilbronn city forest. It remains in the Gipskeuper to Weinsberg, while loess covers the lower valley slopes. Alluvial deposits begin shortly after the stream leaves the forest and continue to its mouth.

The southern and western parts of the drainage basin are underlain by Schilfsandstein, while most of the basin lies in the Gipskeuper, including the Burgberg of Weibertreu and Schemelsberg. Their summits are capped by Schilfsandstein.

== See also ==
- List of rivers of Baden-Württemberg
