= Schozach =

River in Germany

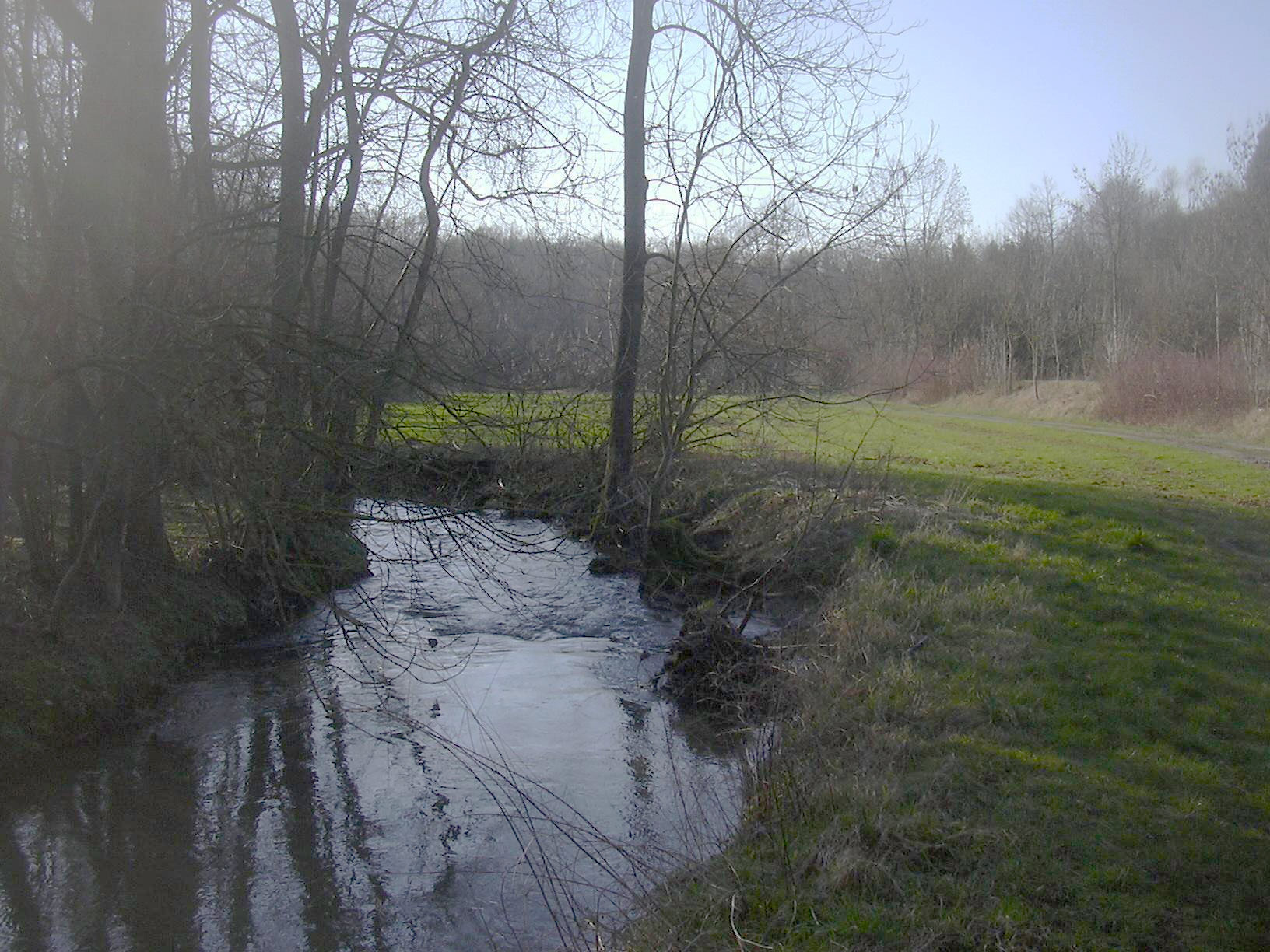

Location
- Country: Germany
- State: Baden-Württemberg

Physical characteristics
- Mouth
  - location: Neckar
  - coordinates: 49°07′13″N 9°11′17″E
- Length: 26.2 km (16.3 mi)

Basin features
- Progression: Neckar→ Rhine→ North Sea

Schozach (German pronunciation: [ˈʃɔt͡sax]) is a river in Germany. It is a right tributary of the Neckar in the southern part of the Heilbronn district of Baden-Württemberg. It has its source near the village Vorhof near Untergruppenbach in the Löwenstein Hills and flows through Oberheinriet, Unterheinriet, Abstatt, Auenstein, Ilsfeld, Schozach and Talheim, and Heilbronn, before it flows into the Neckar near Sontheim, part of Heilbronn. The source is on 301m above sea level, the confluence at 154m above sea level.

== Tributaries ==
Origin of the Schozach in the upper Dautenklinge in a northern tongue of forest meadows near Untergruppenbach atrium on about 305 m.

- Stream from the Schwinglesklinge, from right to 250 m at the footbridge at the end of Oberheinriet, 2,2 km. Occurs in the west of the Masselterklinge a little east of the A 81 at about 330 m.
- Brook from the Plankenklinge, from right at the sports field of Unterheinriet, 1,0 km. Origins before the eastern edge of the Grafenwald at about 270 m and runs through three ponds.
- Buchbach, from left on the Breitwiesen at the end of Unterheinriet at about 235 m 5,6 km.<! -- LUBW-FG10: 5,612 --> Origins in the Löwensteiner Waldgewann Buch at about 385 m next to the artificial Mühlgraben, which here supplies the water of its upper blade of wood, which continues to move further uphill, to the Sulm.
- Bach from the Scheidlesklinge, from the left soon after opposite the Unterheinrieter industrial area, 1,2 km. Origins at

Schellenrain from several sources at about 310 m.

- Vohenlohebach, 1,0 km.
- Happenbach, from the right after the first road bridge in Abstatt on 234.3 m, 3,9 km. Occurs in the area of Untergruppenbach in the northern Grafenwald a little east of the A 81 at about 325 .
- Abstetter Bach, from left at the western edge of Ilsfeld-Auenstein before the Schozach bridge of the feeder road to the junction Ilsfeld, at least 3.0 km. Origins southwest of the Abstetterhof just before the Hammelwald or in it at least 252 m.
- Gruppenbach, after the same road bridge on 226.3 m Occurs in the Heilbronner Stadtwald at the eastern slope of the Hintersberg to the Reisberg at about 355 m.

After the inflow of the Gruppenbach and the crossing under the A 81 the river turns its flow direction from southwest to west.

- Riegelbach, canalized from the right at the Ilsfelder Bad at the Robert-Mayer-Straße, 1,7 km. Origins in the Steinlesgrund at about 260 m.
- Eichenweggraben, from left at the mountainous settlement edge of Ilsfeld, 1,2 km.
- Eigersbach, from the left at the bridge of the K 2156 from Ilsfeld to the Pfahlhof, 1,6 km. Develops beside the forest road at about 280 m, in the local area verdolt.
- Wässerung, from the right at the sewage plant below Ilsfelds below 225, 1,8 km. Occurs at the vineyard slope Gänser at about 275 m

After the inlet of the Wässerung the river enters its narrow, meandering Muschelkalk blade at the lower reaches and turns its flow direction from west to north-northwest.

- Landgraben, below the Schozach bridge of Schozach, 2,3 km. Develops as a road ditch at the junction of the K 2048 to Schozach from the L 1100 at about 290 m.
- Frankelbach, from right in the south Talheims on 195.9 m, 3,1 km. Occurs in the middle Durstlache at about 265 m and after a little more than half the run it passes the 1,3 ha big Frankelbachsee.
- Deinenbach, from the right about hundred meters before the mouth, 7,3 km. Origins on the district of Flein east of the vineyard Kapfenhart on about 260 m.

The Schozach after 25.6 km run about 400 km below the Neckar bridge of the Neckar valley road (K 9564) at house No. 32/1 of the Horkheimer road in Heilbronn-Sontheim at 154.0 m from the right into the Neckar.
