= Obereisesheim transmitter =

Radio transmission facility in Neckarsulm, Germany

Coordinates: 49.19105°N 9.19681°E

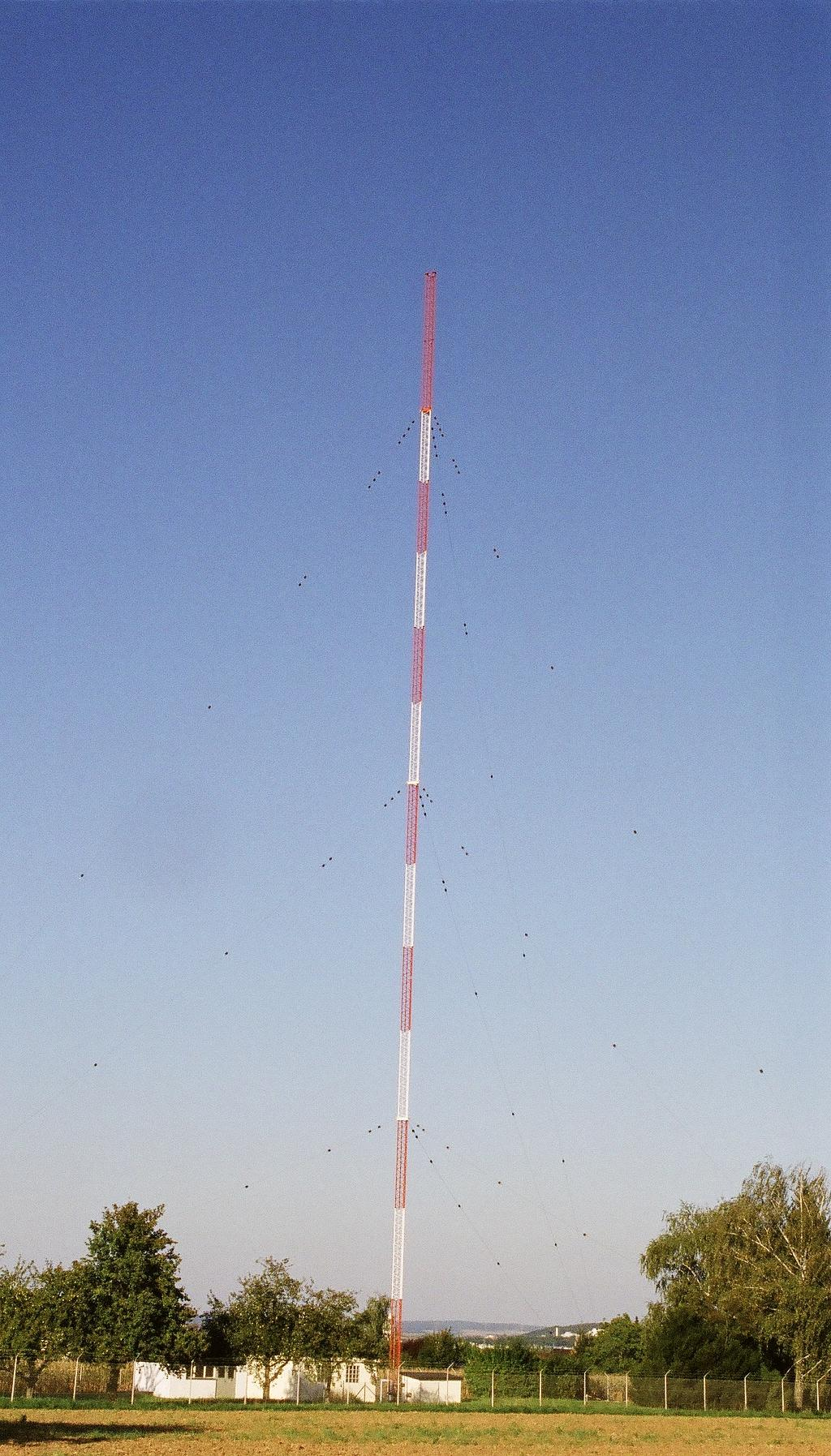
Obereisesheim transmission mast

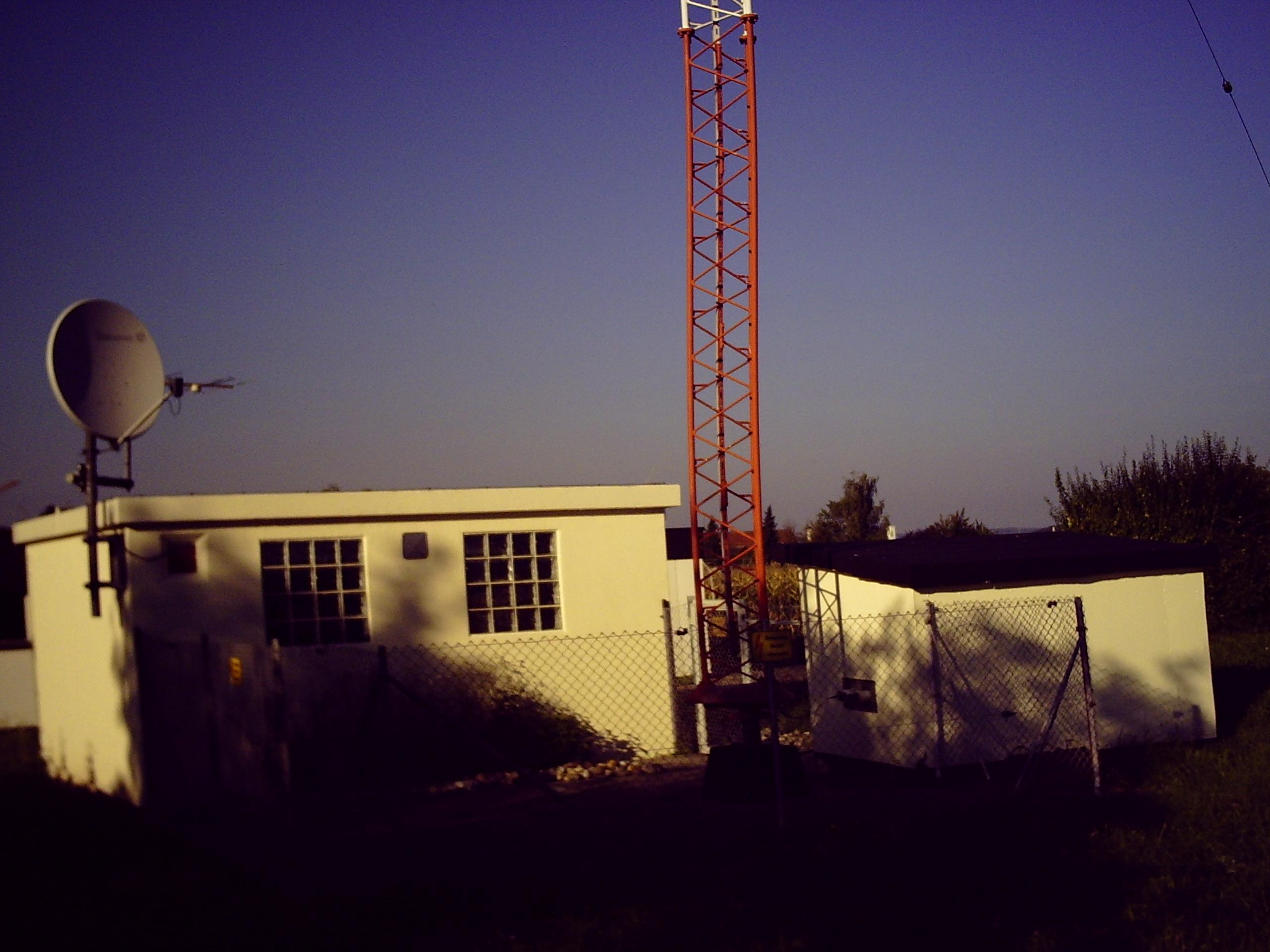
Base of Obereisesheim transmission mast

Obereisesheim transmitter was a facility of SWR used for mediumwave broadcasting on 711 kHz with a power of 5 kilowatts. It was located near Neckarsulm, Germany. Obereisesheim transmitter, which is situated at 49°11'28" N and 9°11'47" E, used as aerial a 74-metre-tall (243 ft) ground-fed, insulated mast radiator, which was a lattice steel mast with triangular cross section and guyed in 3 levels. Obereisesheim transmitter worked on the same frequency as Ulm-Jungingen transmitter. It was switched off on 1 July 2011 and demolished in October 2018.
