= Erlenbach, Baden-Württemberg =

Erlenbach
- Municipality
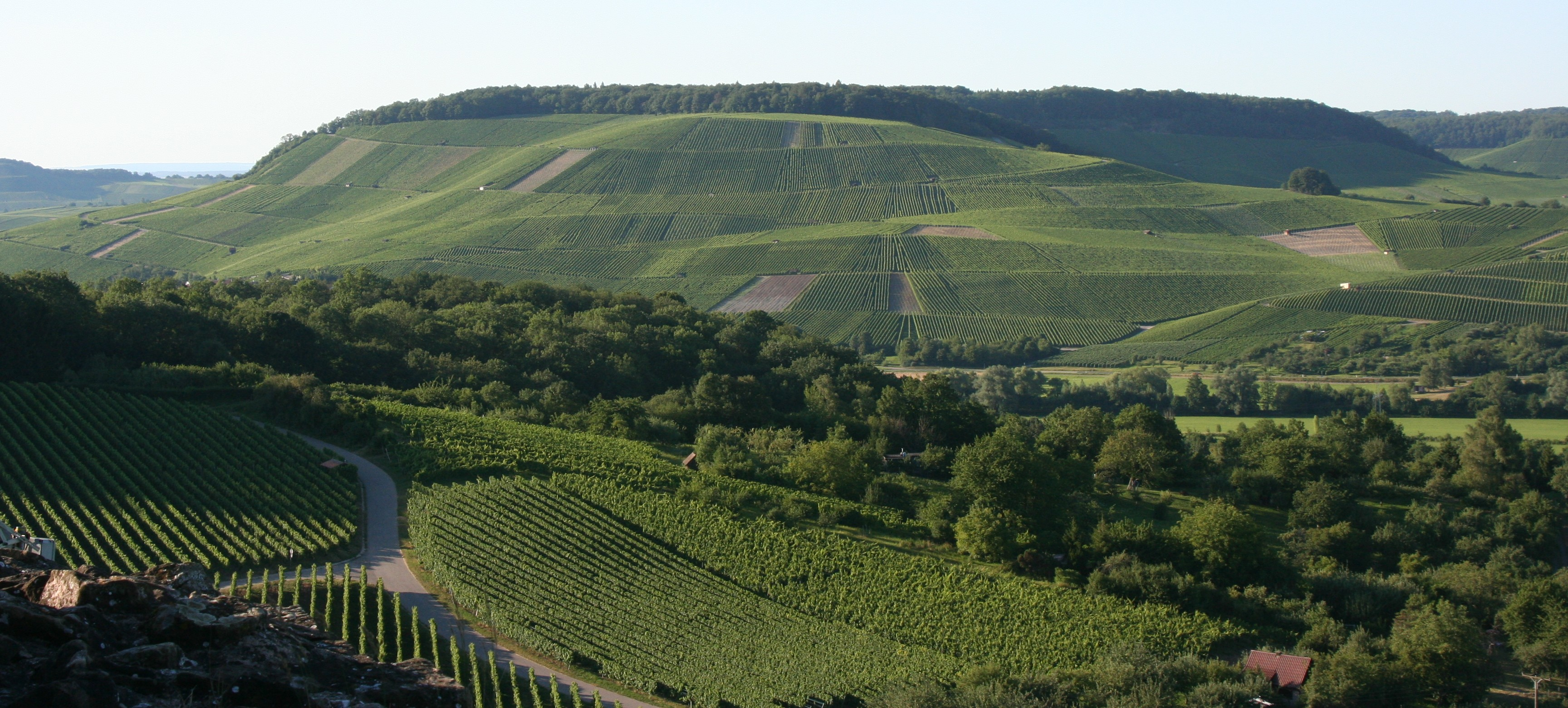

- Coat of arms

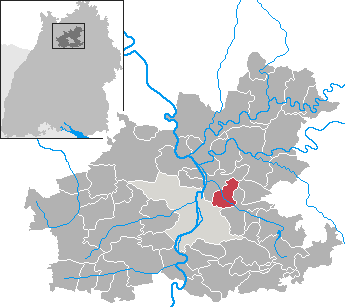
- Location of Erlenbach within Heilbronn district
- Interactive map of Erlenbach
- Location within Germany Location within Baden-Württemberg
- Coordinates: 49°10′N 9°16′E
- Country: Germany
- State: Baden-Württemberg
- Admin. region: Stuttgart
- District: Heilbronn
- Subdivisions: 2

Government
  - Mayor (2018–26): Uwe Mosthaf

Area
  - Total: 12.73 km^{2} (4.92 sq mi)
- Elevation: 254 m (833 ft)

Population (2025-12-31)
  - Total: 5,179
  - Density: 406.8/km^{2} (1,054/sq mi)
- Time zone: UTC+01:00 (CET)
  - Summer (DST): UTC+02:00 (CEST)
- Postal codes: 74235
- Dialling codes: 07132
- Vehicle registration: HN
- Website: www.erlenbach-hn.de

Erlenbach (German: [ˈɛʁlənbax]) is a municipality in the district of Heilbronn in Baden-Württemberg in southern Germany.

== Geography ==
Erlenbach lies at the foot of the 317-metre-tall (1,040 ft) Kayberg in the lower Sulmtal (valley of the river Sulm) in the eastern part of district of Heilbronn.

Neighbouring Erlenbach are Heilbronn and Neckarsulm to the west, Eberstadt to the east, and Weinsberg to the southeast.

=== Subdivisions ===
Erlenbach is composed of two formerly separate villages, Erlenbach in the east and Binswangen in the west.

== History ==
Both Erlenbach and Binswangen are supposed to have been founded in 500 by the Franks and Alamanni, respectively. Erlenbach was first mentioned in the Codex Hirsaugiensis in 1130 as a gift to the Hirsau Abbey. The first record of Binswangen is in a charter on 8 November 1176 from Pope Alexander III. At this time, both communities were under authority of the Lords of Weinsberg.

Later, both communities were transferred from the Archbishopric of Mainz to the Teutonic Order on 27 May 1484 as part of the Bailiwick Franconia. After the dissolution of the monastic states of the Teutonic Knights in 1805, they came under control of Württemberg and were placed under district authority of Oberamt Neckarsulm, which was renamed Kreis (English: District) Neckarsulm in 1934.

The communities Erlenbach and Binswangen officially combined under the name Erlenbach on 1 April 1935. On 1 October 1938, after the dissolution of Kreis Neckarsulm, Erlenbach was placed in the Landkreis Heilbronn. The population was counted at 2137 people in 1939. During the population growth and resulting construction activity after World War II, Erlenbach and Binswangen have grown together to form a single village.

== Religion ==
Erlenbach is predominantly Catholic, having two Catholic parishes: St. Martinus Erlenbach and St. Michael Binswangen. The Evangelical Christ Church(in German) was dedicated in 1965.

== Places of interest ==
=== Churches ===
==== St. Martinus ====
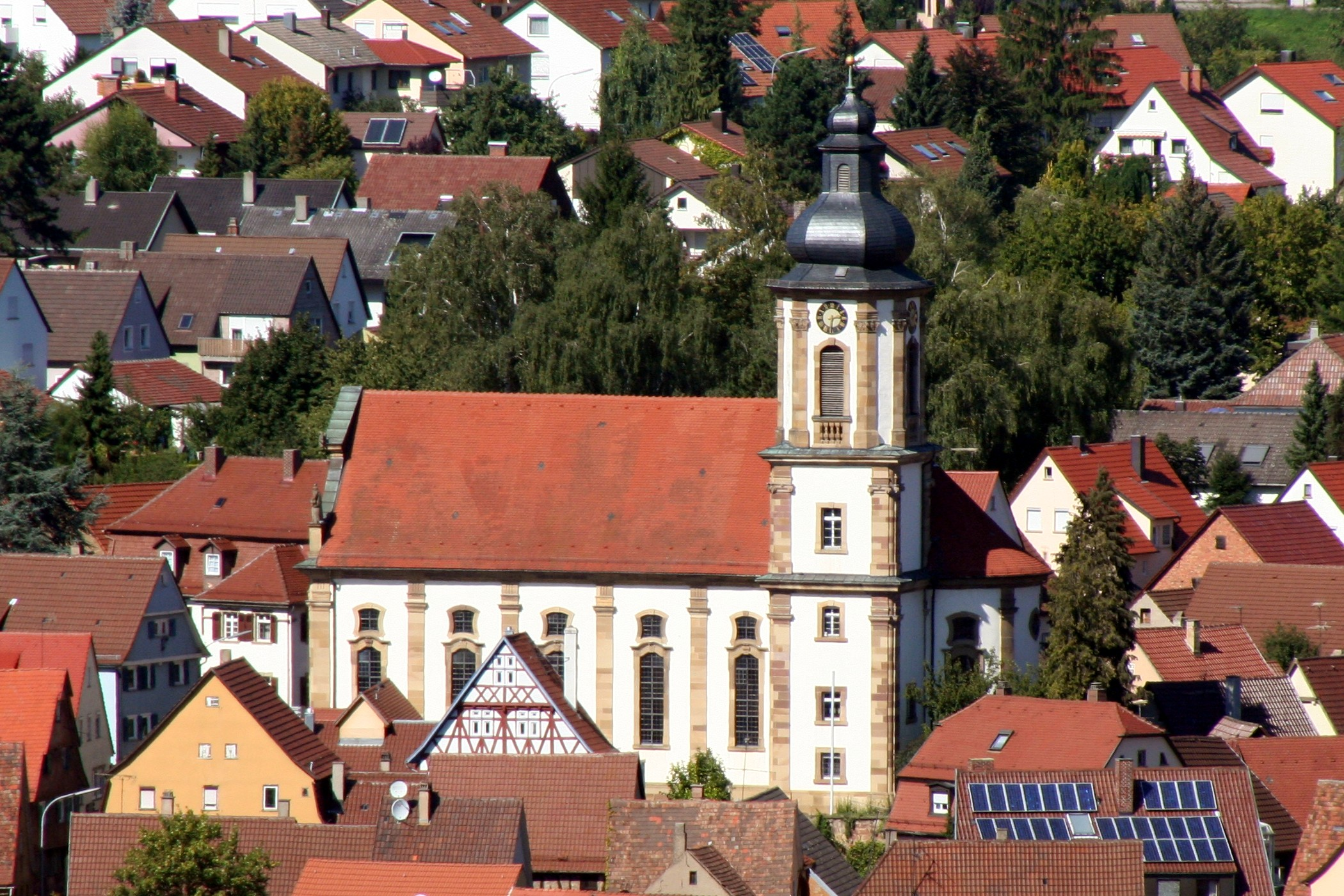
St. Martinus in Erlenbach

The Catholic parish St. Martinus in Erlenbach was rebuilt between 1753 and 1760 in late Baroque style on the site of an older Martinskirche. The Baroque parish-house was built in 1781 by Franz Häffele.

==== St. Michael ====
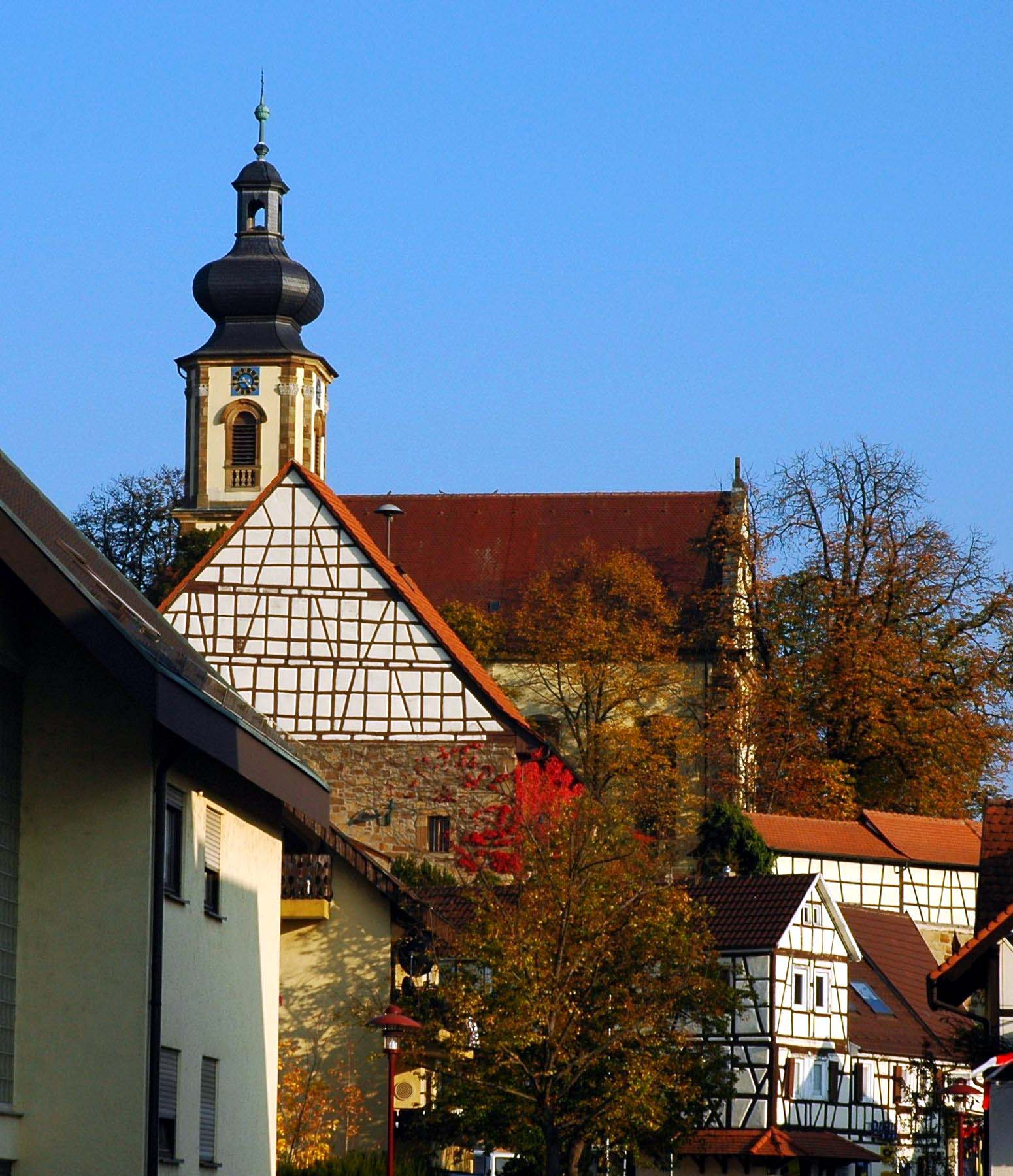
St. Michael in Binswangen

The Catholic parish St. Michael in Binswangen was built by Ludwig Bronner in 1788 on the site of a 1578 predecessor and was dedicated in 1818. The reason for the relatively long time between construction and dedication is largely unknown.

=== Other buildings ===
One of the oldest buildings in Erlenbach is the Erlenbach Bakery from 1575, which was a schoolhouse until 1813.

The old town hall, a large stone building from 1876 with a crow-stepped gable is now a residence. The current town hall in the marketplace was built in 1698.

The 450 square meter tithe barn of the Teutonic Knights from 1574 now houses the Viniculture museum "Alte Kelter Binswangen" (Old Binswangen Winepress).

== Culture ==
=== Music ===
Every year, the music club in Erlenbach arranges a Spring concert and, every two years, a serenade in the marketplace as well as a church concert in the St. Martinus church. Additionally, it is the main organizer of the Original Erlenbach Wine Festival.

=== Sport ===
Apart from the normal sports club in Erlenbach, there is a cycling club, RSV Erlenbach, which is well known for artistic cycling.

=== Regular events ===
There are two annual wine festivals:

- Rund um den Wein (Around the wine) - every July in the multipurpose hall
- Original Erlenbacher Weinfest (Original Erlenbach Wine Festival) - during the third weekend in August at the town hall in the marketplace

During Mardi-Gras, the Binswangen Carnival Club puts on a parade and variety show.

== Partner cities ==
- Seiches-sur-le-Loir France vor 2000

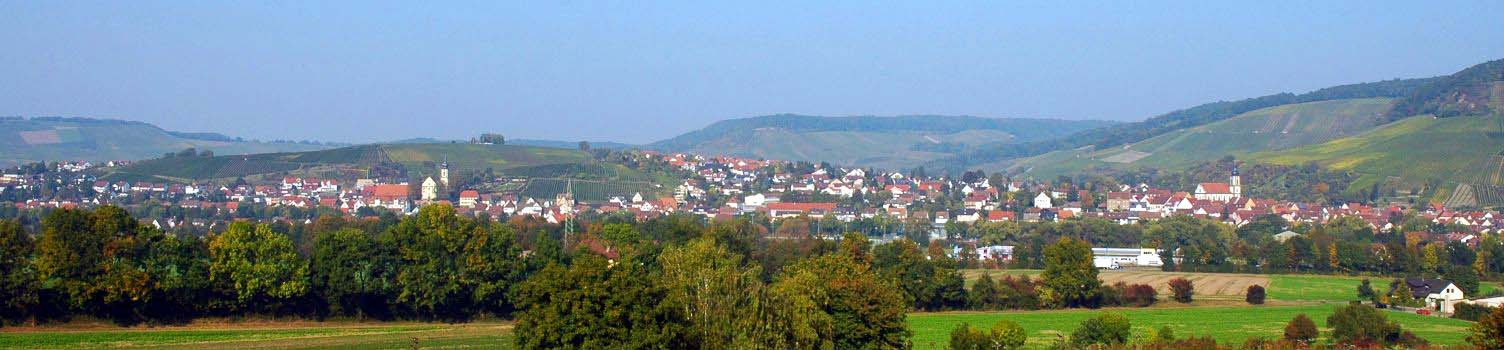
