= Gruppenbach (Schozach) =

River in Germany

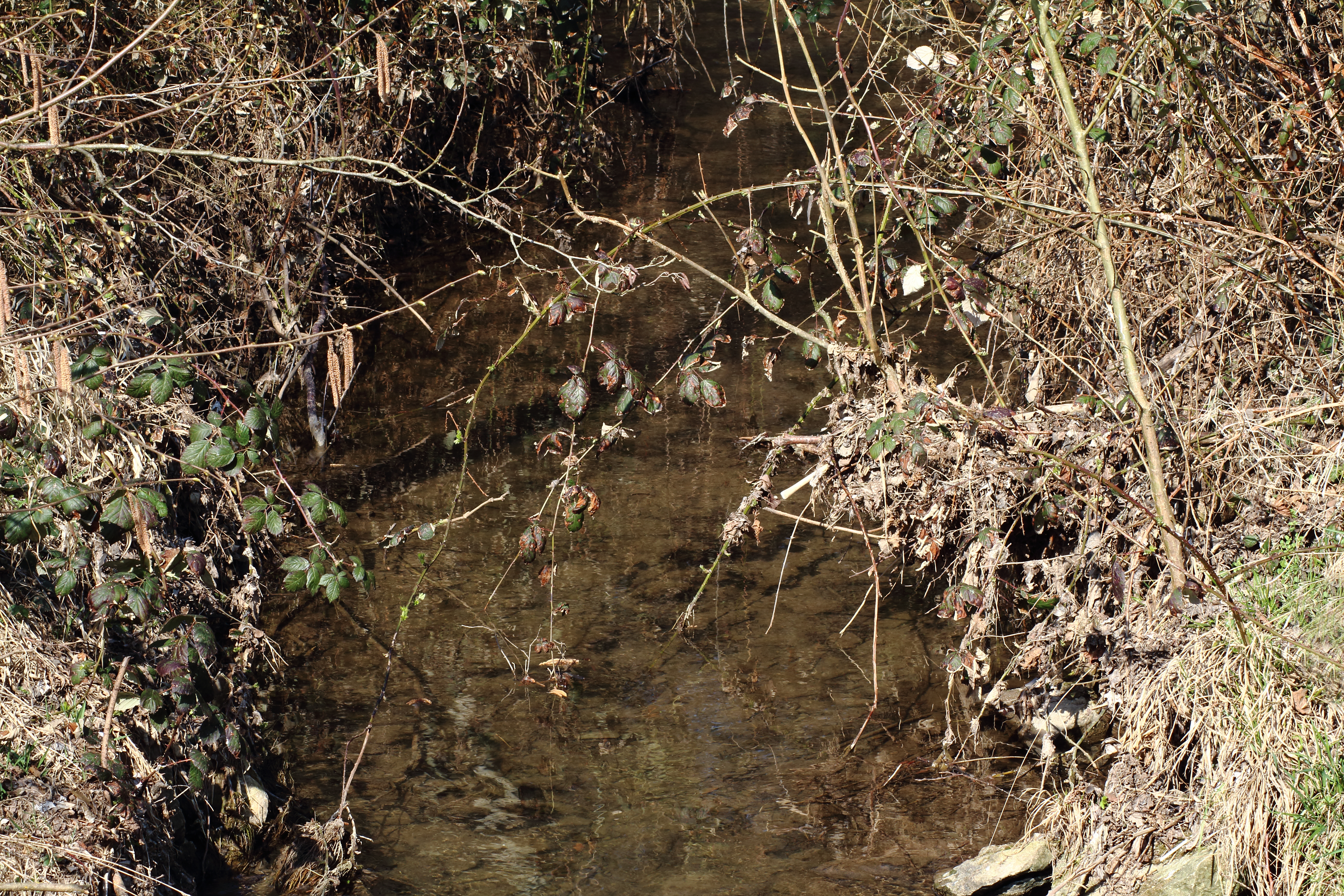

Location
- Country: Germany
- State: Baden-Württemberg

Physical characteristics
- Mouth
  - location: Schozach
  - coordinates: 49.0559°N 9.2739°E

Basin features
- Progression: Schozach→ Neckar→ Rhine→ North Sea

Gruppenbach is a river of Baden-Württemberg, Germany. It is a right tributary of the Schozach at Auenstein, a part of the municipality of Ilsfeld.

== See also ==
- List of rivers of Baden-Württemberg
