= Neckarsulm TDS Office Tower =

Office building in Neckarsulm, Germany

Coordinates: 49°10′53″N 9°13′59″E

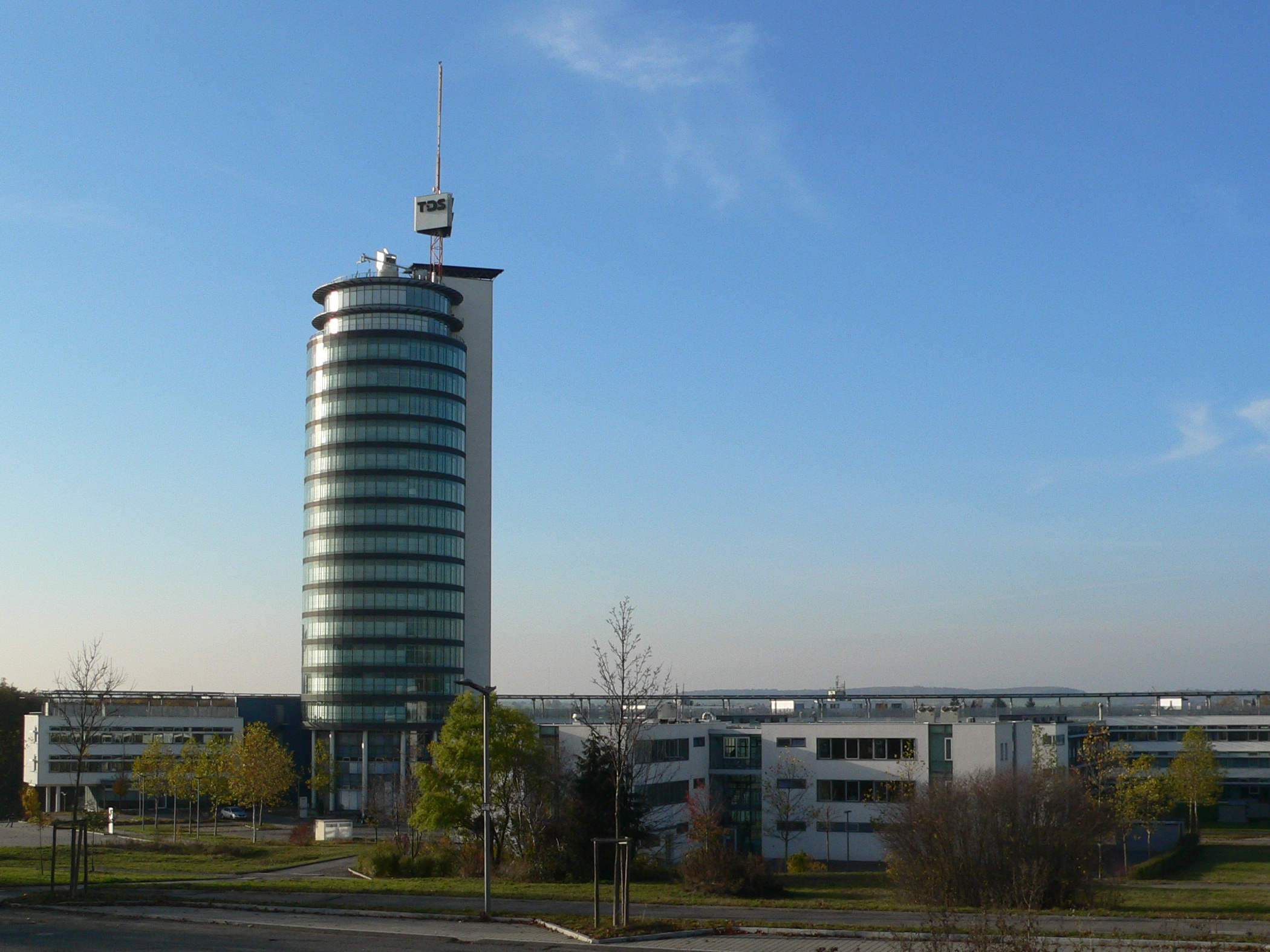
Neckarsulm TDS Office Tower in Neckarsulm with Antenna

Neckarsulm TDS Office Tower is a high-rise office building in Neckarsulm, Germany. Built between 1997 and 1999, the tower stands at 70 metres (230 ft) tall with 20 floors. Neckarsulm TDS Office Tower houses the offices of TDS AG, dsb AG and the LIDL training center.

TDS Office Tower was constructed during the period 1997 to 1999. Including the roof-mounted antenna it is 103 metres tall and the tallest office building in the Heilbronn area.
