= Simon Molitor =

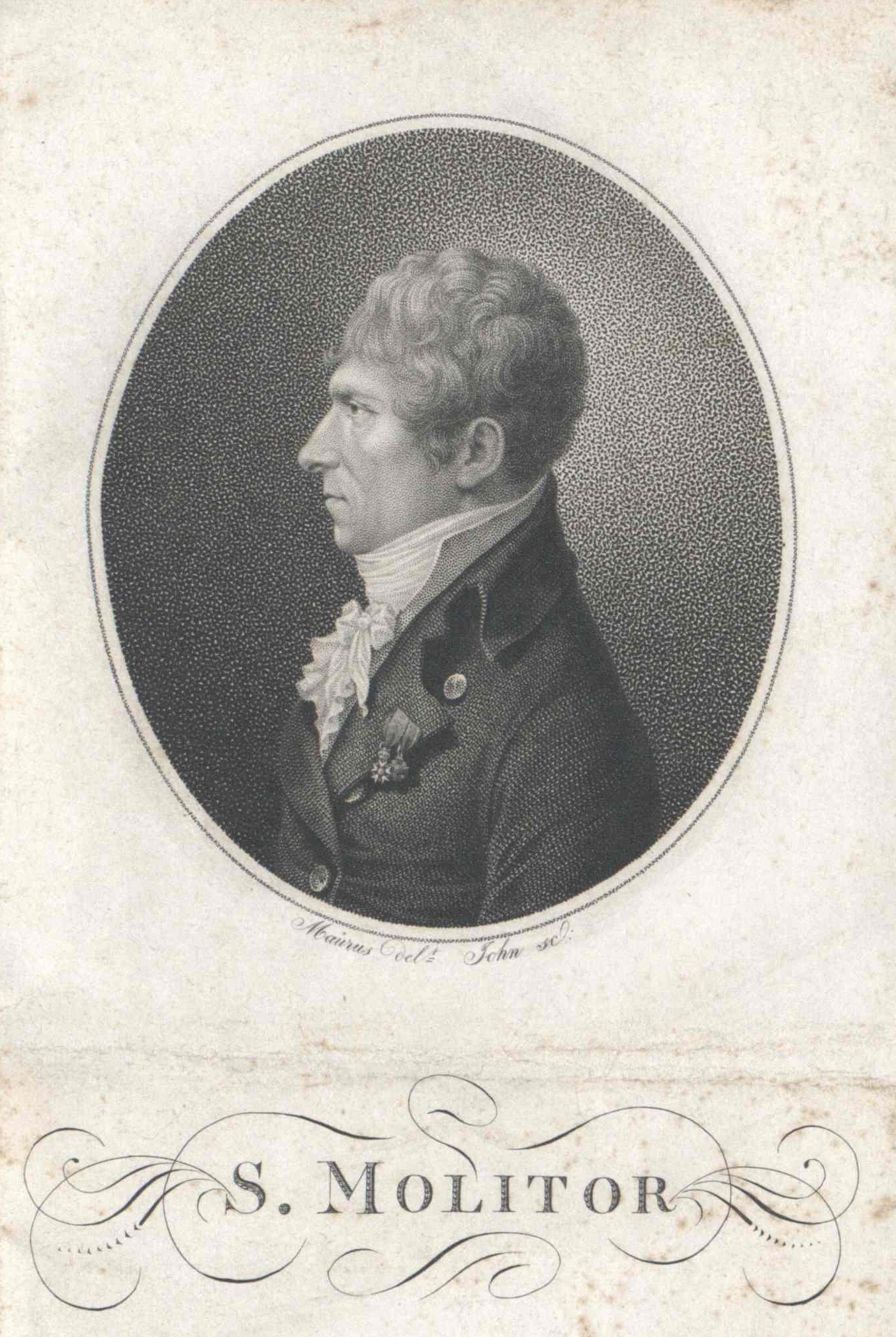
Simon Molitor (1766–1848)

(Alois Franz) Simon (Joseph) Molitor (3 November 1766 – 21 February 1848) was a German-born Austrian composer, guitarist, violinist and music historian – an influential figure both in early 19th-century guitar music and in the development of music history as a subdiscipline of musicology.

== Life and music ==
Simon Molitor was born in Neckarsulm, southern Germany. According to Zuth (1920), he was to follow his father's wish and become a school teacher, but as an 18-year-old student he secretly left university and began the life of an itinerant violinist, until during 1796–7 he became the conductor of an orchestra in Venice, Republic of Venice. In 1798, he became a civil servant in the Austrian Commissariat of War in Vienna where, from 1802, he took a career in catering there until his retirement in 1831.

From that time on, Molitor concentrated exclusively on music. Between 1832 and 1842 he organised regular 'academies' in his house – semi-public musical performances and lectures, mainly devoted to historic music of the 16th to 18th centuries (in particular focusing on Bach, Corelli, Kirnberger, Monteverdi and Palestrina). Molitor possessed one of the largest musical libraries of his time. In a number of writings he published his research findings of the musical history of Austria, also engaging with contemporary musical criticism and the writing of Fétis in France. For these reasons, Molitor is today regarded as one of the founding fathers of Austrian musicology.

In Vienna, besides his civil servant job and particularly after his retirement, he made a name for himself as a performing guitarist, teacher and composer. His works and published theories proved very influential on contemporary guitarists in Vienna such as Wenzel Matiegka and Ludwig Joseph Wolf. The Große Sonate (Grand Sonata) op. 7 (1807) became a particularly widely praised piece. In an extended foreword he explains not only the history of the guitar as an artistic solo performance instrument, but also presents a new way of notating polyphony and a modern compositional approach, which were eagerly taken up by his contemporaries and successors.

== Selected compositions ==
Orchestral works

- 5 violin concertos in B flat major, D major, A major, D major, C major

Chamber music

- Sonata in F major op. 3 (1805) for violin and guitar
- Grande sonate concertante op. 5 (1806) for violin and guitar
- Trio in D major op. 6 (1806) for violin or flute, viola, guitar

Guitar solo

- Große Sonate op. 7 (1807)
- Variationen op. 9 (c. 1808)
- Rondo (avec un Adagio) in A major op. 10 (c. 1808)
- Grande sonate in C major op. 11 (1809)
- Sonata in C major op. 12
- Sonata in G major op. 15
- Method Versuch einer vollständigen methodischen Anleitung zum Guitarre-Spielen […] (1812), written with "R. Klinger" (= Wilhelm Klingenbrunner)

Piano music

- 12 Menuette op. 1 (before 1804)
- 11 Walzer op. 2 (before 1804)

== Recordings ==
- Music of the Viennese Classics, performed by Duo Donath, on: Querstand VKJK 0027 (CD, 2005). Contains: Sonata op. 3 for violin and guitar (also a work by Mauro Giuliani).
- Simon Molitor: Works for Guitar, performed by Massimo Agostinelli, on: Urania LDV 14002 (CD, 2014). Contains: Große Sonate op. 7; Rondo (avec un Adagio) op. 10; Sonata in C major op. 12; 6 Ländler; Funeral March.

== Bibliography ==
- Josef Zuth: Simon Molitor und die Wiener Gitarristik (um 1800) (Vienna, 1920)
- Josef Zuth: Handbuch der Laute und Gitarre (Vienna, 1926–8)
