= Sulm (Germany) =

River in Germany

Coordinates: 49°12′N 9°13′E

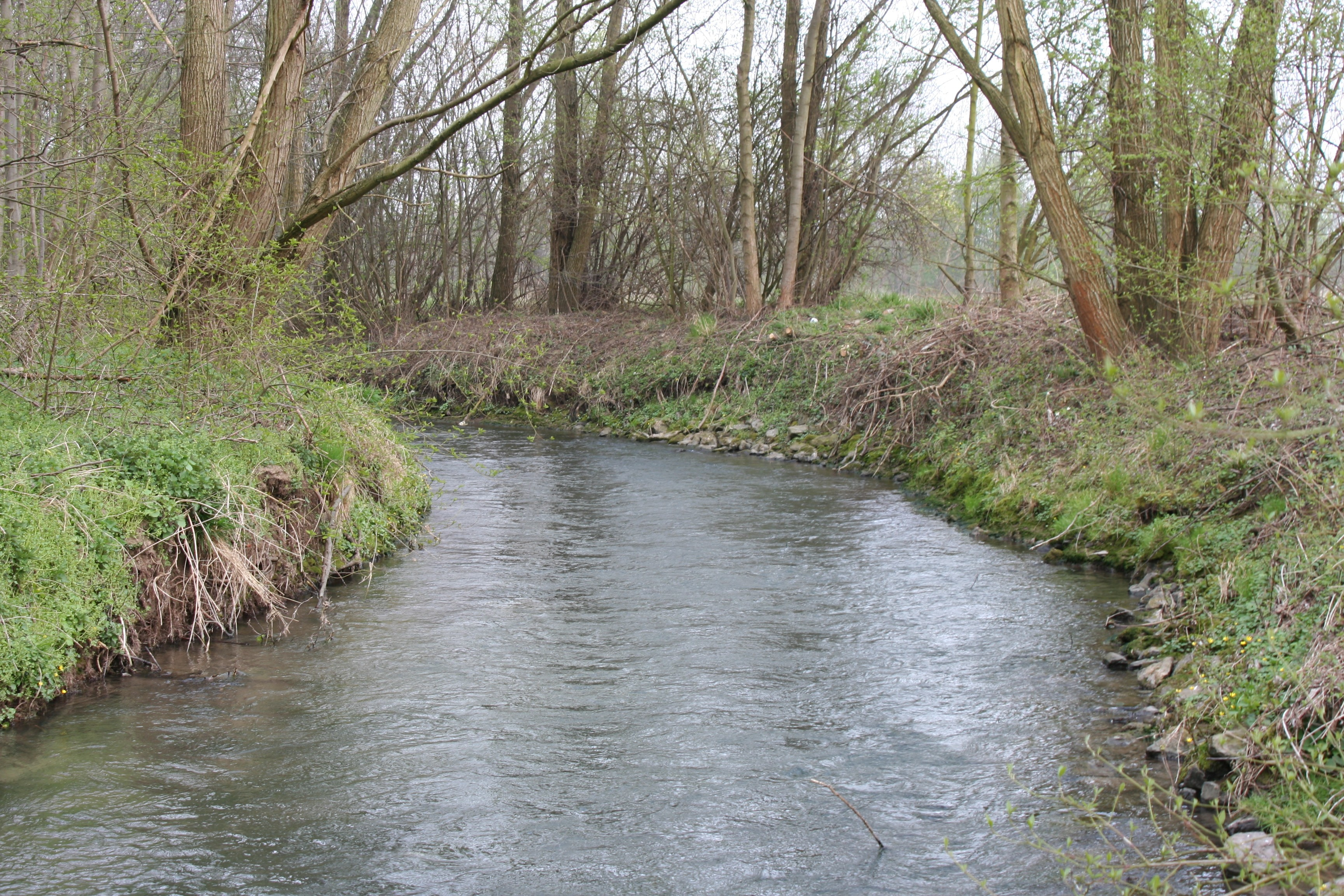
- The Sulm near Erlenbach

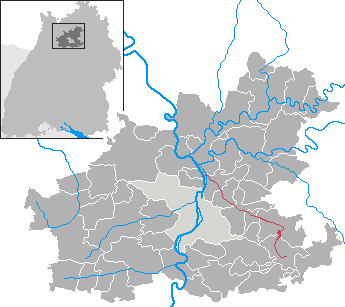
- Course of the Sulm (red) within the district of Heilbronn

Location
- Country: Germany
- State: Baden-Württemberg
- City: Neckarsulm

Physical characteristics
- Source
  - location: Löwenstein
  - elevation: 463 m (1,519 ft)
- Mouth: Neckar
  - location: Neckarsulm
  - elevation: 148 m (486 ft)
- Length: 26.3 km (16.3 mi)
- Basin size: 122 km^{2} (47 sq mi)
- Discharge
  - location: Bad Friedrichshall
  - average: 0.92 m^{3}/s (32 cu ft/s)

Basin features
- Progression: Neckar→ Rhine→ North Sea

The Sulm (German pronunciation: [zʊlm]) is a river in the Heilbronn district of Baden-Württemberg, Germany. It is an unnavigable right tributary of the Neckar. It rises in the Löwenstein Mountains and after 26.3 kilometres (16.3 mi) distance and 315 metres (1,033 ft) elevation drop flows into the Neckar at Bad Friedrichshall, near Untereisesheim and Neckarsulm. Its valley together with its tributary valleys is also known as the Weinsberg Valley (Weinsberger Tal), after Weinsberg, which is located there. The medieval region of Sulmgau, as well as the city of Neckarsulm, were named for it. The upper valley of the Sulm is a protected area.

== Geography ==
The Sulm rises south of Löwenstein at the edge of the Löwenstein Mountains. It originates in several brooks, and which brook specifically constitutes the source is subject to interpretation. One such brook which has three points of origin and sometimes termed the Sauklinge is marked as the source by a sign. One of the tributaries of the stream while it is still small is fed by an artificial lake called the Bleichsee. This is located between the watersheds of the Sulm and the Schozach and maintained by dams; the Buchbach, which rises at an altitude of 465 metres (1,526 ft) and flows into it via an old mill stream, would otherwise be a tributary of the Schozach, but the stretch of it between the Bleichsee and the Sulm, or sometimes its entire length, is sometimes attributed to the Sulm, in which case the overall length of the Sulm becomes 26.2 kilometres (16.3 mi).

The name Sulm is indisputably attached to the river that proceeds from the confluence near State Road 1111 of the Sauklinge and the brook flowing from the Bleichsee. From that point it flows north on the edge of the Teusserbad section of Löwenstein and past Castle Lautereck, built in 1623; it is in an underground culvert for a short stretch crossing the property of the Teusser company. It then turns east and flows past the Rittelhof section of Löwenstein. South of Bundestraße 39 it feeds a mill pond at the Seemühle, the last of what were originally 3 mills serving Löwenstein. After passing under the B39, at an altitude of approximately 222 metres (728 ft), it is dammed to form the Breitenauer See, an artificial lake or detention basin 40 hectares (99 acres) in area which was created in 1975–80 for flood control. The majority of this lake lies within the territory of Obersulm. Northwest of the Weiler section of Obersulm, the former bed of the Sulm is now fed only by springs and drainage discharge pipes, while the river flows under the dam in a culvert to a point north of the Weiler–Affaltrach road, where it flows into the old mill stream of the Affaltrach mill and after a few dozen metres into the Schlierbach, a tributary via which it rejoins the original riverbed a few metres further on. The Sulm then turns west-northwest, flowing through the Affaltrach and Willsbach sections of Obersulm. Willsbach is situated in the Sülzbach valley on its right bank. The Sulm flows along the north-east edge of Ellhofen, under the Hohenlohe Railway, and then directly north-west through the territory of Weinsberg, although it does not pass through the town itself.

At Weinsberg it is initially channelled through the Weinsberg motorway interchange, where the A 6 and A 81 cross. Until 1971, this was the location of a mill which was removed when the interchange was built; the Hasenmühle mill remains beside the river north-west of that point. Below the confluence of the Weißenhofbach, within the territory of Erlenbach but to the east of the town itself, there is a flood-control basin.

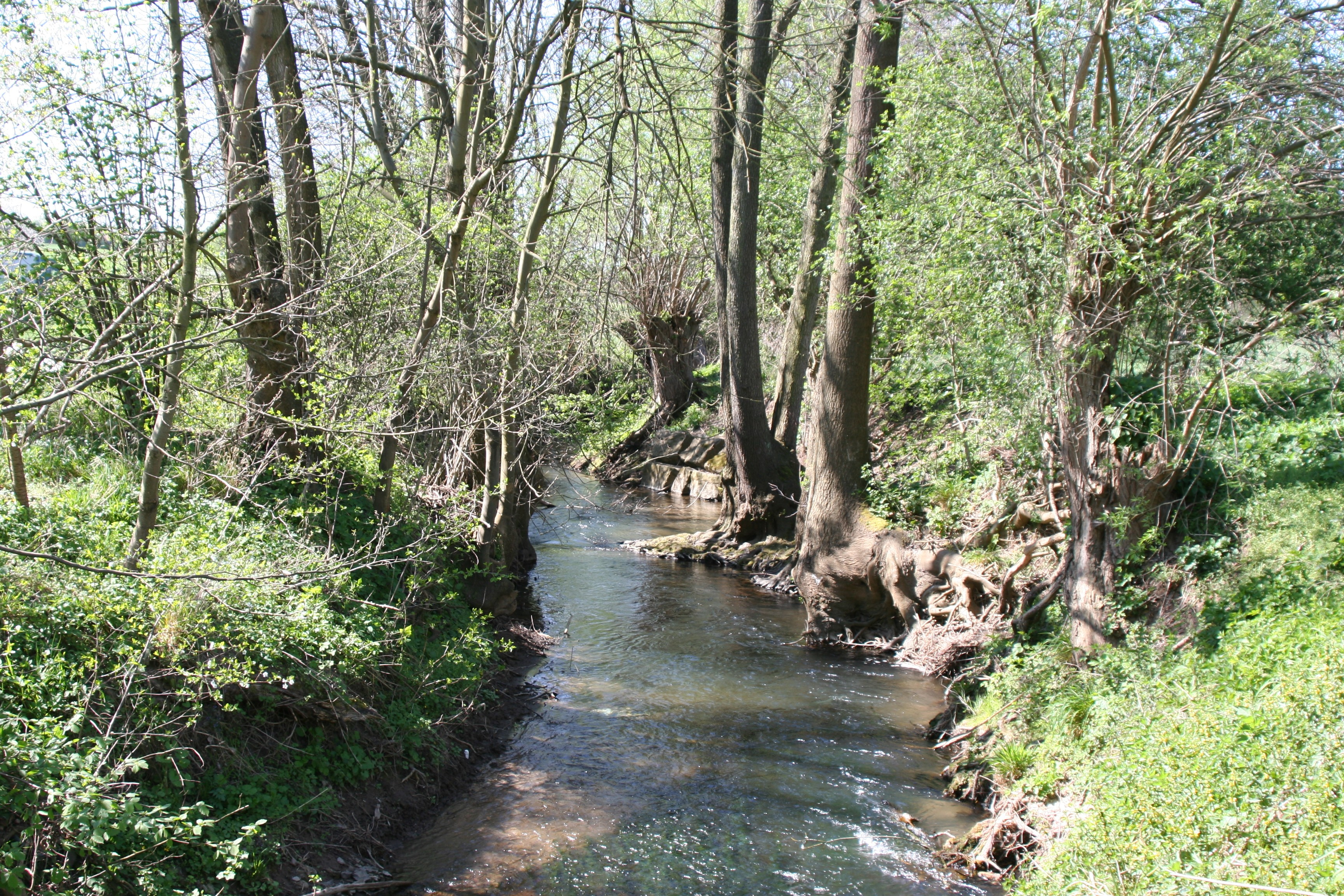
The Sulm at the Sülzbach section of Obersulm

The river continues its flow northwest toward Neckarsulm, passing on its right bank Erlenbach and the Binswangen section of that town. The valley bottom is half a kilometer wide at this point and is spanned by the dam of a further flood control basin. Leaving the town, the bed of the Sulm has been straightened where it passes through the Sulmtalpark, which was created in 1975. Within the territory of Neckarsulm, there were previously mills along its course; the Nähermühle, at the city border, was removed in 1988. At this point the Sulm previously flowed in a wide curve to the north and then the west through the grounds of the NSU Motorenwerke plant; following two floods in 1970, it was diverted into a culvert in 1973–75. It now flows underground for more than 2.6 kilometres (1.6 mi) and at the border between Neckarsulm and Bad Friedrichshall at the Neckar Canal, this section of which was completed in 1925, is piped under the canal. A little upstream of the canal, the Sulm can be seen in a maintenance channel several metres below.

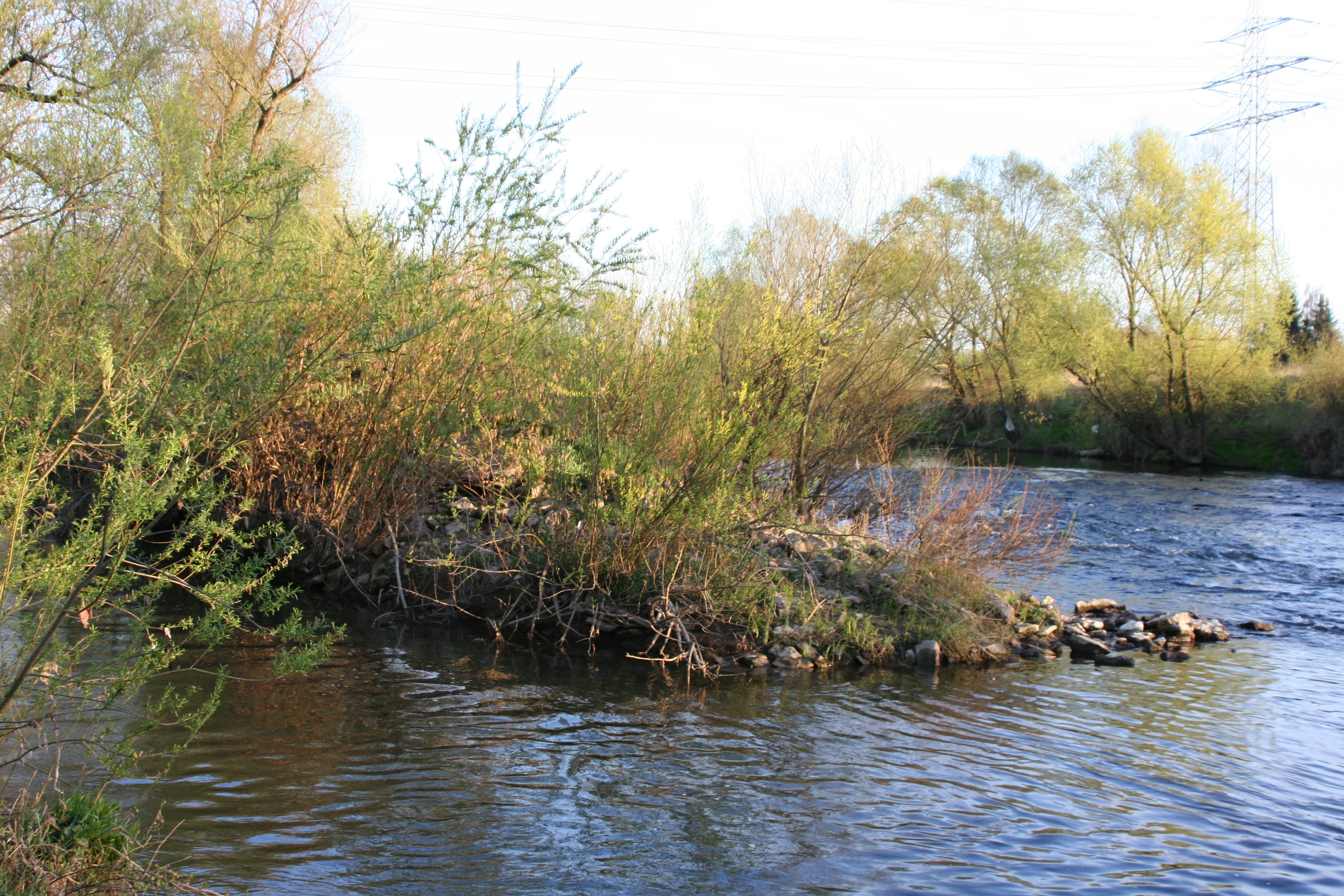
Confluence of the Sulm (left) and the Neckar

On the west side of the Neckar Canal, the river re-emerges on the 'island' between the canal and the former channel of the Neckar and flows for approximately 250 metres (820 ft) through Bad Friedrichshall territory immediately north of the border with Untereisesheim before emptying into the Neckar across from the southern part of Untereisesheim, at an altitude of 148 metres (486 ft).

=== Catchment area ===
The watershed of the Sulm comprises 111 square kilometres (43 sq mi) and is bordered by the watersheds of the Brettach to the north and east, the Schozach to the southwest and the Murr to the southeast.

Its major tributaries (with the location of their confluence) are on the right: the Schlierbach (Affaltrach in Obersulm), the Michelbach (Affaltrach), the Seebächle (Willsbach in Obersulm), the Sülzbach (Sülzbach in Obersulm), and the Weißenhofbach (in its upper reaches called the Eberbach; above Erlenbach); and on the left: the Hambach (Willsbach in Obersulm), the Ellbach (Ellhofen), and the Stadtseebach, Saubach, or Weinsbergerbach (Erlenbach).

== History ==
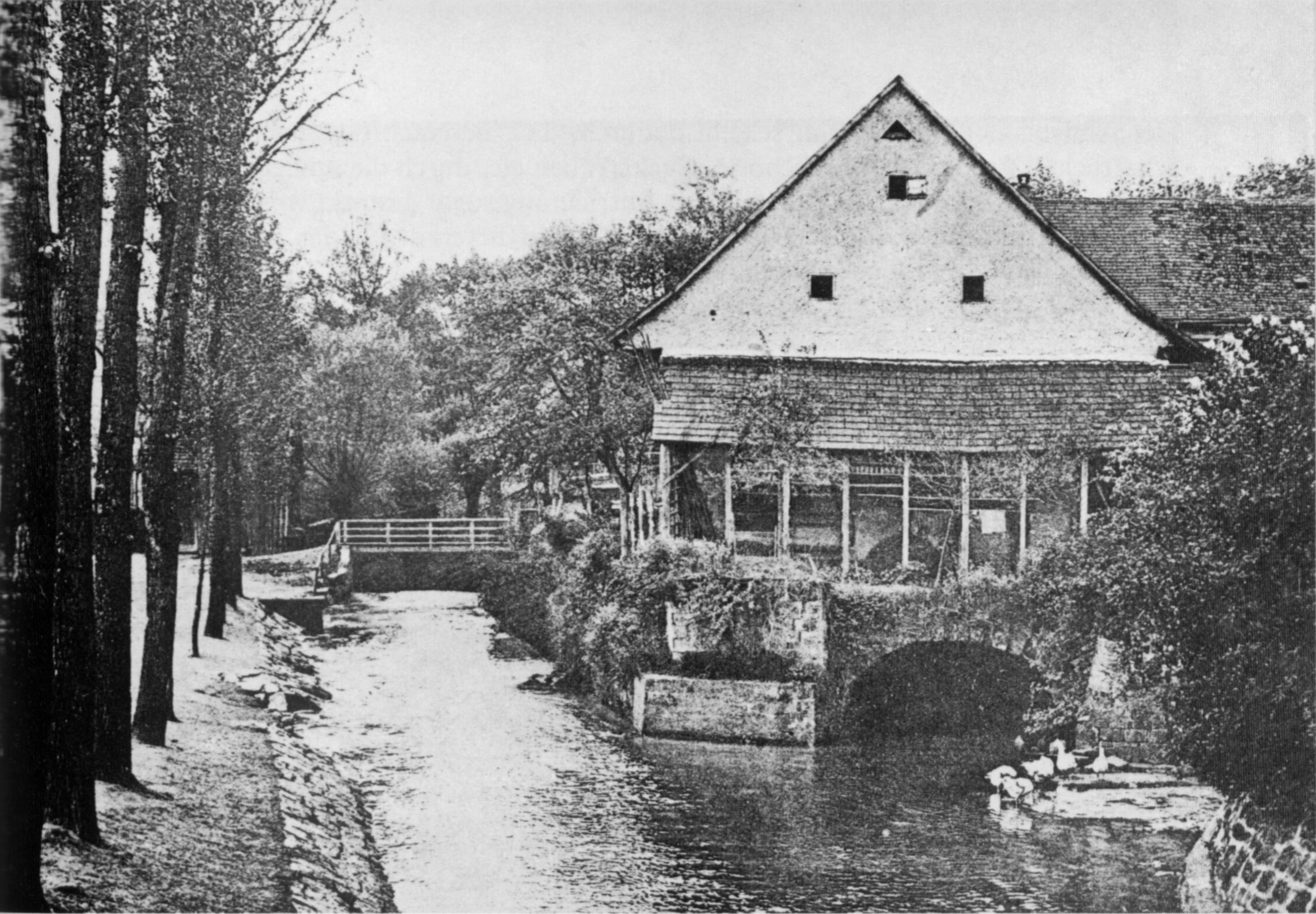
Former Nähermühle mill, on the edge of Neckarsulm, photographed around 1900

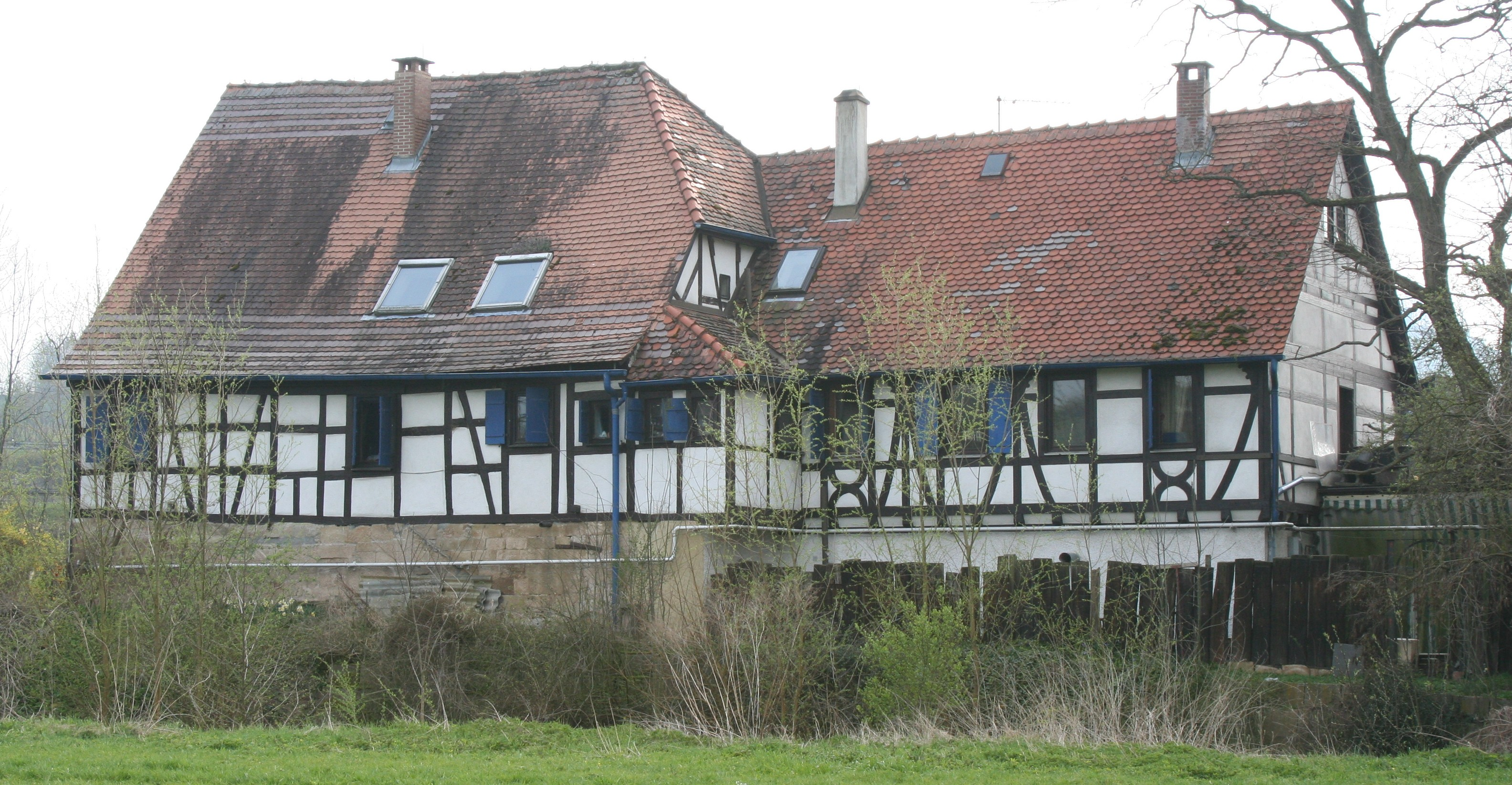
Hasenmühle mill, by the motorway interchange at Weinsberg

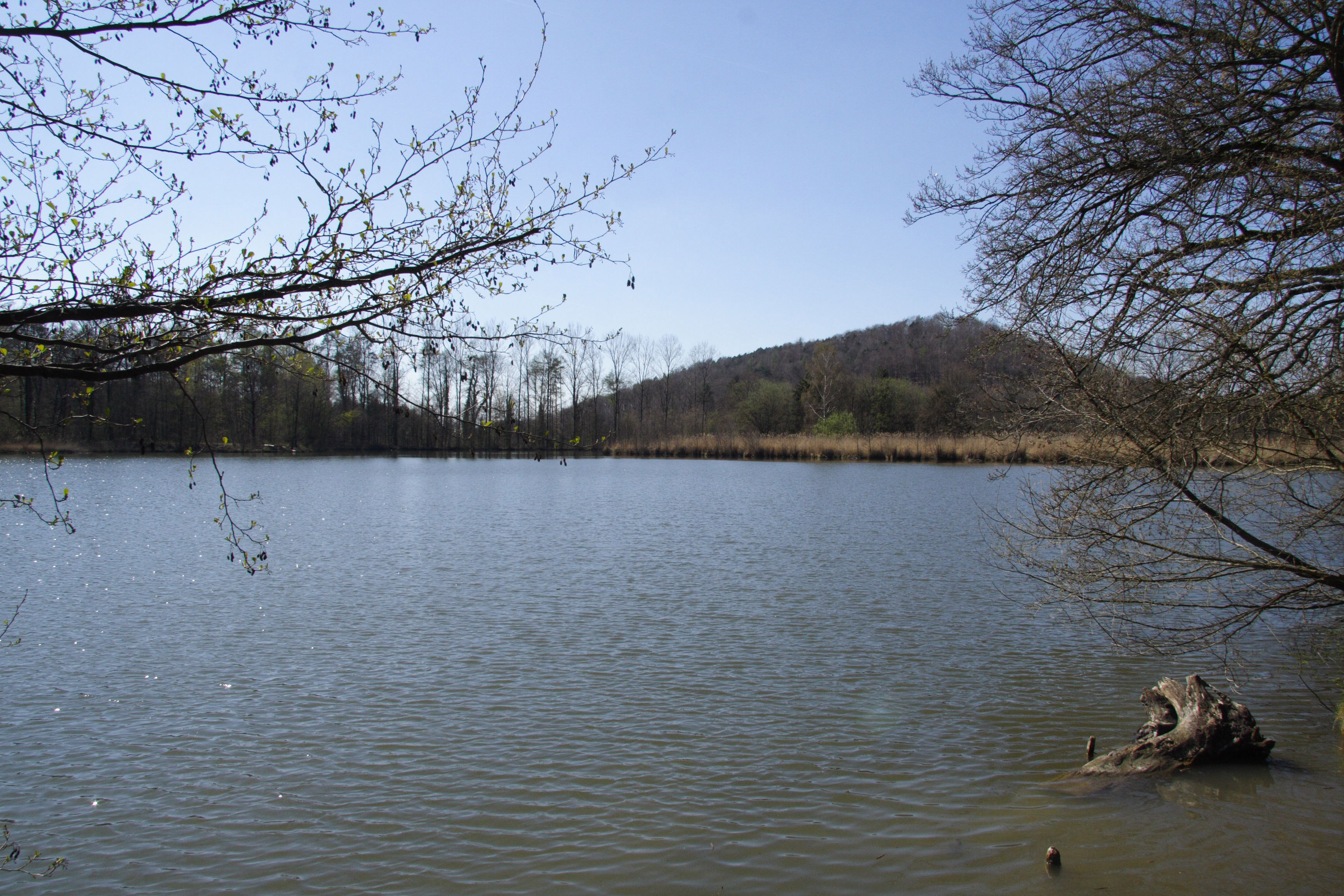
Bleichsee, an artificial lake constructed as a flood retention basin on a tributary of the Sulm

The earliest archaeological traces of settlement in the Sulm valley are from the Neolithic. Numerous finds in the Willsbach section of Obersulm suggest a permanent settlement. A Roman settlement has been shown to have existed in Weinsberg, and a Roman road ran through the Sulm valley connecting the forts on the limes at Böckingen in Heilbronn and at Öhringen. Subsequently, Alemanni and Franks settled the valley.

The first recorded mention of the name Sulm is in a 771 charter of Lorsch Abbey in which Neckarsulm is referred to as villa sulmana. It probably derives from an Ablaut form of the Germanic *swalm, "surge". It also gave its name to the medieval gau of Sulmgau, recorded as Sulmanachgowe in charters of the 770s and 780s.

Since the river is not navigable, for years its main economic importance was driving mills, of which there were more than 20 on the Sulm and its tributaries between Löwenstein and Neckarsulm. Since millers often had the right to create mill ponds, they sometimes also created fishing pools, some of which still exist. Mill races provided the necessary water gradient to drive the mills. The mill race which fed the Affaltrach mill survives, although for the most part dry; the mill race of the Willsbach mill, which fell 4.5 metres (15 ft) over a length of more than 1.8 kilometres (1.1 mi) was closed in 1963 and filled in in 1972. Both mills, and that on the Schlierbach in the Weiler section of Obersulm, are still in operation but no longer water-powered. NSU Motorenwerke originated in a sewing machine company that began operations in 1880 at the Brunnersche Mühle, a sawmill and gypsum mill in Neckarsulm, and used the river for power.

In 1980–2003, the flow of the Sulm at Erlenbach averaged 920 litres (32 cu ft) per second. Prior to the flood control measures on the upper Sulm, during one high water on 18 June 1978, it reached almost 60,000 litres (2,100 cu ft) per second. Floods occurred regularly, were exacerbated by increasing ground sealing, and presented a problem for the industries located between the Sulm and the Neckar in Neckarsulm. After two high waters in February and May 1970 flooded the Audi NSU plant, which was of great economic importance to Neckarsulm and the region, and led to a 14-day interruption of production, the State of Baden-Württemberg decided to institute flood-control measures. In 1973, the Wasserverband Sulm (Sulm Water Authority) was founded; this is headquartered in Weinsberg and the district and city of Heilbronn and all towns and settlements along the Sulm and its tributaries are members, including Bad Friedrichshall, Bretzfeld, Eberstadt, Lehrensteinsfeld und Oedheim. Earlier plans to culvert the river in Neckarsulm were carried out in 1973–75, and in November 1974 a retention basin was completed on the eastern edge of Neckarsulm, where it borders Erlenbach. The Sulm now flows underground for 2.6 kilometres (1.6 mi) through Neckarsulm until it crosses under the Neckar Canal. In 1975–80, the Breitenauer See was constructed as a central flood control basin in the Sulm valley, and additional retention basins were constructed along the Sulm and its major tributaries during the remaining decades of the 20th century. These measures have considerably mitigated flood damage, for example during a heavy rainfall on 5 July 2006 of up to 86.4 litres (3.05 cu ft) per square metre. As of 2009, 15 of a planned total of 17 retention basins have been completed. Costs were estimated at 10.2 million euro in 1973; total costs are currently estimated at 36 million euro.

== Environment ==
The lower Sulm has been extensively channelled and culverted, the upper Sulm less so. However, its course has been altered even in some of the upper reaches. For example, in 1950 it was regularised' in Willsbach, and in 1963 in Affalbach, its tributary the Michelbach was culverted because of the smell of the polluted water. Over almost its entire course, the hydromorphological condition of the river is assessed as impaired or removed from its natural state. Its water quality was assessed in 2004 as relatively impaired (Class II), but in immediate proximity to the source, slightly impaired (Class I–II).

Since 1979, the upper Sulm valley has been designated as a protected area, Oberes Sulmtal mit Randhöhen, and it lies within the Swabian-Franconian Forest Nature Park. The Bleichsee on one of its tributaries, which has been protected since 1978, is one of the most important spawning areas for amphibians in the district of Heilbronn. When the Breitenauer See was created, much accommodation was made for nature: parts of the lake are closed to human use, shallows were created for fish to spawn, and over 100,000 trees, bushes, and shrubs were planted to provide an environment for the approximately 140 local bird species, some of which are rare.

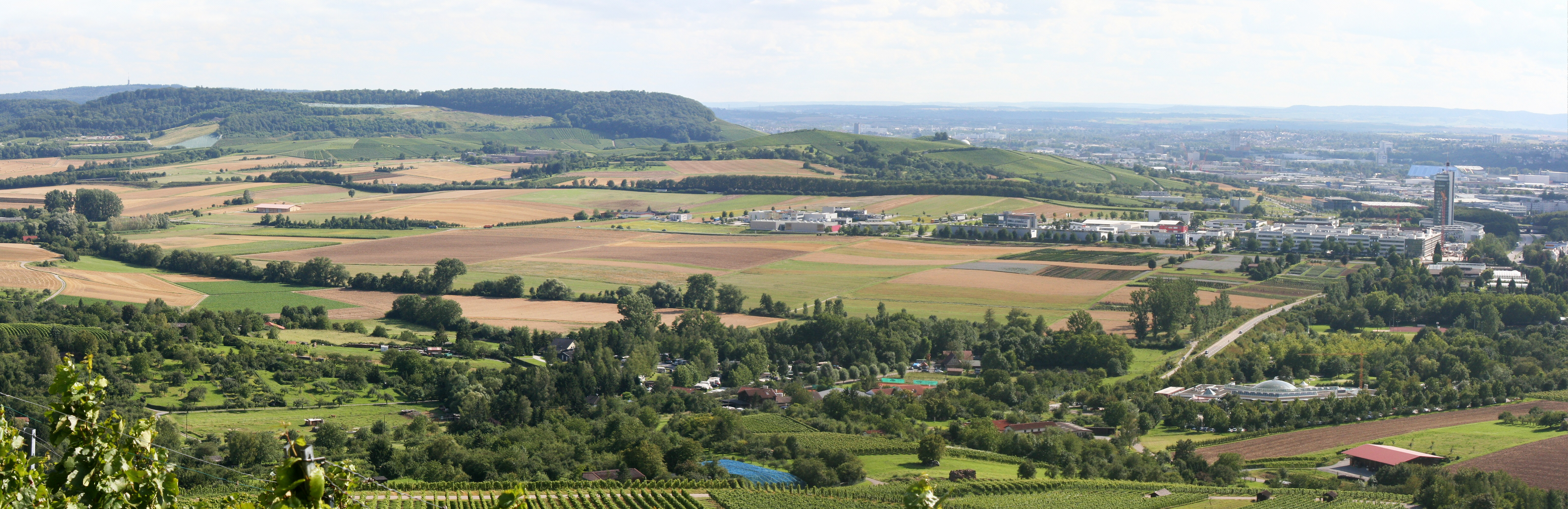
Lower Sulm valley between Erlenbach (left) and Neckarsulm (right). Heilbronn in the right distance. Road lower right crossing dam of Neckarsulm detention basin.
