= Neckarsulm =

- Town
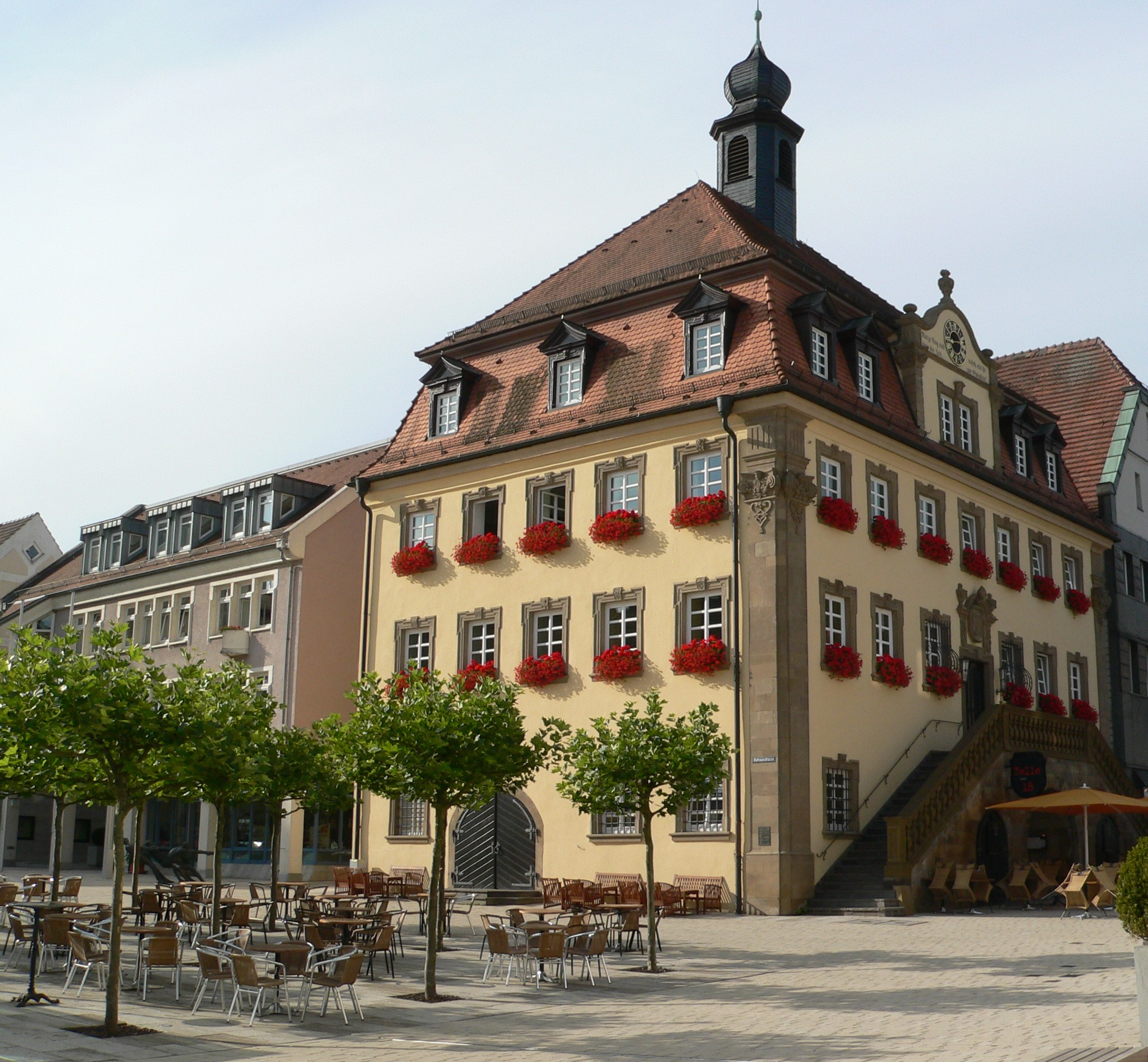

- Coat of arms

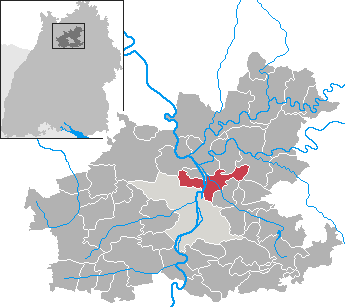
- Location of Neckarsulm within Heilbronn district
- Interactive map of Neckarsulm
- Location within Germany Location within Baden-Württemberg
- Coordinates: 49°11′30.1″N 9°13′28.4″E
- Country: Germany
- State: Baden-Württemberg
- Admin. region: Stuttgart
- District: Heilbronn
- Subdivisions: 4

Government
  - Mayor (2016–24): Steffen Hertwig

Area
  - Total: 24.94 km^{2} (9.63 sq mi)
- Elevation: 162 m (531 ft)

Population (2025-12-31)
  - Total: 26,470
  - Density: 1,061/km^{2} (2,749/sq mi)
- Time zone: UTC+01:00 (CET)
  - Summer (DST): UTC+02:00 (CEST)
- Postal codes: 74172
- Dialling codes: 07132
- Vehicle registration: HN
- Website: Neckarsulm.de

Neckarsulm (German pronunciation: [nɛkaʁˈzʊlm]) is a city in northern Baden-Württemberg, Germany, near Heilbronn, and part of the district of Heilbronn. As of 2016, Neckarsulm had 26,800 inhabitants. The name Neckarsulm derives from the city's location where the Neckar and Sulm rivers meet.

Neckarsulm is known for its renewable energy projects and wine. The Weingärtnergenossenschaft Neckarsulm-Gundelsheim (winegrower's cooperative of Neckarsulm and Gundelsheim) is the oldest winegrower's collective in Germany. The wine Trollinger and Lemberger are the principal varieties of grape grown in this region. The Schwarz Gruppe (Schwarz Group) who leads both companies Lidl and Kaufland has its headquarters in Neckarsulm.

Neckarsulm was first mentioned in a document in 771 and was granted city status around 1300. The city celebrated its 1250th birthday in 2021.

== Geography ==
Neckarsulm is located on the eastern side of the Neckar River Valley. The town is approximately 30 kilometres (19 mi) from the Löwenstein Mountains and is part of the Swabian-Franconian Forest. The closest nearby city is Heilbronn, the sixth largest city in the federal state Baden-Württemberg.

The urban area of Neckarsulm consists of the city itself and the districts of Amorbach, Dahenfeld, and Obereisesheim.

== History ==
Archaeological finds such as vessel shards indicate human activity in the greater Neckarsulm region as early as the middle of the 6th millennium B.C. (Neolithic period). In 2001, archaeologists found a Late Bronze Age burial ground in Trendpark-Süd (roughly on the modern day site of the German IT company "Bechtle"), which was dated to around 1100 BC on the basis of metal and ceramic finds. Graves found south of the old city wall indicate a Frankish settlement dating to the 7th century AD.

The town, formerly called "Sulmana" or "Sulmgau", is dated to the year 771 in a deed of donation to Lorsch Abbey. Sulmana is mentioned in the Lorsch Codex. The area became known as Neckarsulm in the 16th century.

== Notable landmarks ==
- German Two-Wheeler and NSU Museum - a museum dedicated to two-wheeled vehicles including riding cars and motorcycles produced in Germany. The museum is housed in the Teutonic Order Castle Neckarsulm.
- Stadtmuseum Neckarsulm - City museum of Neckarsulm which tells the history of the city from medieval times to present days. The year of the construction of museum's house dates to 1545.
- Neckarsulm TDS Office Tower
- Obereisesheim transmitter
- Remnants of the medieval city wall along the western and northern sides of the centre.

== Mayors and Lords Mayor ==
- 1845–1865: Franz Josef Alexander Heinrich Becker
- 1865–1878: Josef Pecoroni
- 1878–1885: Johann Nepomuk Kirner
- 1885–1911: Bernhard Rettenmeier
- 1911–1913: Heinrich Soller
- 1913–1941: Johannes Häußler
- 1942–1945: Oskar Volk
- 1945–1946: Hermann Greiner
- 1946–1949: Johannes Häußler (1879–1949)
- 1949–1955: Erwin Wörner
- 1955–1967: Hans Hoffmann (1915–2005)
- 1967–1992: Erhard Klotz (born 1938)
- 1992–2008: Volker Blust
- 2008–2016: Joachim Scholz
- since 2016: Steffen Hertwig

== Population ==
The numbers are estimates, census results (¹) or data from statistical offices.

Year	Inhabitants
1527	ca. 1000
1635	ca. 1400
1756	1544
1810	2050
1849	2576
1. December 1871	2576
1. December 1880 ¹	2845
1. December 1890 ¹	3011
1. December 1900 ¹	3707
1. December 1910 ¹	5170
16. June 1925 ¹	6692
16. June 1933 ¹	7035

Year	Inhabitants
17. May 1939 ¹	8593
December 1945	7559
13. September 1950 ¹	9319
6. June 1961 ¹ ²	15.299
27. May 1970 ¹	18.517
31. December 1975	20.112
31. December 1980	21.871
27. May 1987 ¹	21.534
31. December 1990	22.690
31. December 1995	25.788
31. December 2000	27.408

Year	Inhabitants
31. December 2002	27.425
31. December 2004	27.296
31. December 2006	27.246
31. December 2008	26.828
31. December 2010	26.511
31. December 2012	25.754
31. December 2014	25.798
31. December 2015	26.304
31. August 2016	26.749

¹ Census results

² The population increase between 1950 and 1961 comes from the new district Neckarsulm-Amorbach. In 1955, around 3,000 people lived in this place.

== Economy ==
The Schwarz Group, owner of Lidl and Kaufland — the largest European food chain — has its headquarters in Neckarsulm.

The city was home of car manufacturer NSU which was taken over by Volkswagen in 1969 and fused with Auto Union to create Audi. The former NSU plant is the smaller of Audi's two principal assembly plants in Germany and manufactures the company's larger, high-end models such as the Audi A6, A7, A8. Audi's performance subsidiary Audi Sport GmbH which produces the R8 and manages their racing activities is also placed here. NSU denotes Neckarsulm.

Other well-known companies based in Neckarsulm are Fujitsu TDS, Bechtle AG and Rheinmetall Automotive AG.

== Notable people ==
=== Honorary citizens of Neckarsulm ===
- 1894: Franz Joseph Maucher (1826–1910), was a chaplain and parish priest in Neckarsulm for 35 years.
- 1911: Gottlob Banzhaf (1858–1930), was Kommerzienrat and after the death of his brother Christian Schmidt first director the Neckarsulmer Strickmaschinenfabrik AG from 1884 to 1910.
- 1930: Ernst Josef Bauer (died 1881), was a teacher and successful author of the local play "Peter Heinrich Merkle, the Löwenwirt of Neckarsulm".
- 1933: Christian Mergenthaler (1884–1980), NSDAP politician, Prime Minister of Württemberg from 1933 to 1945. On 27 July 1933, Neckarsulm granted him honorary citizenship which had been revoked on 28 August 1945.
- 1949: Johannes Häußler (1879–1949), was mayor of Neckarsulm for 30 years.
- 2004: Kurt Bauer (born 1934), was city council for 36 years, deputy mayor, SPD parliamentary leader and chairman of the SPD local association.
- 2008: Volker Blust (born 1944), was head of the city's main and personnel office and was elected in 1992 as mayor of Neckarsulm.

=== Born in Neckarsulm ===
- Franz Simon Molitor (1766–1848), in Vienna, musician

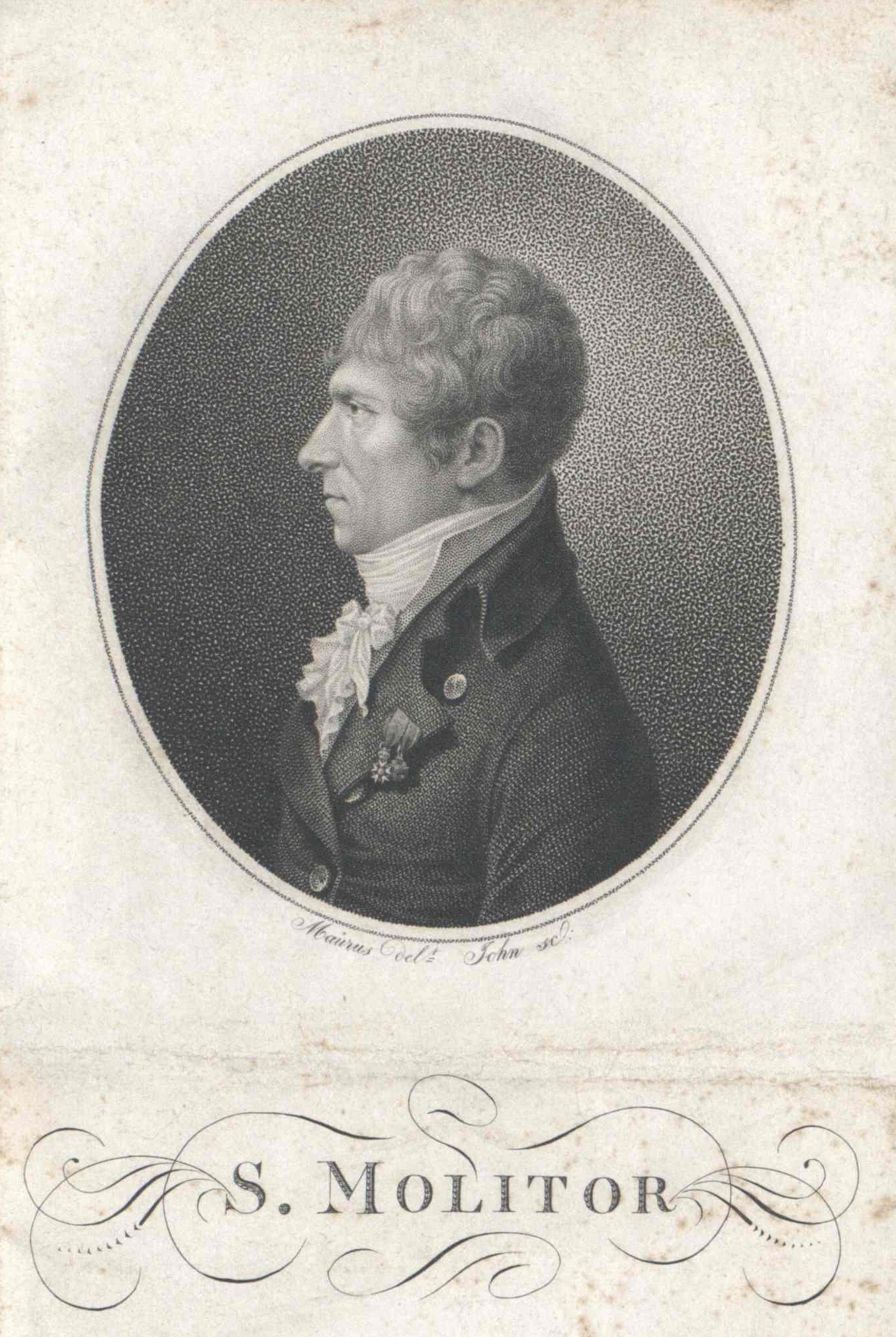
Simon Molitor portrait

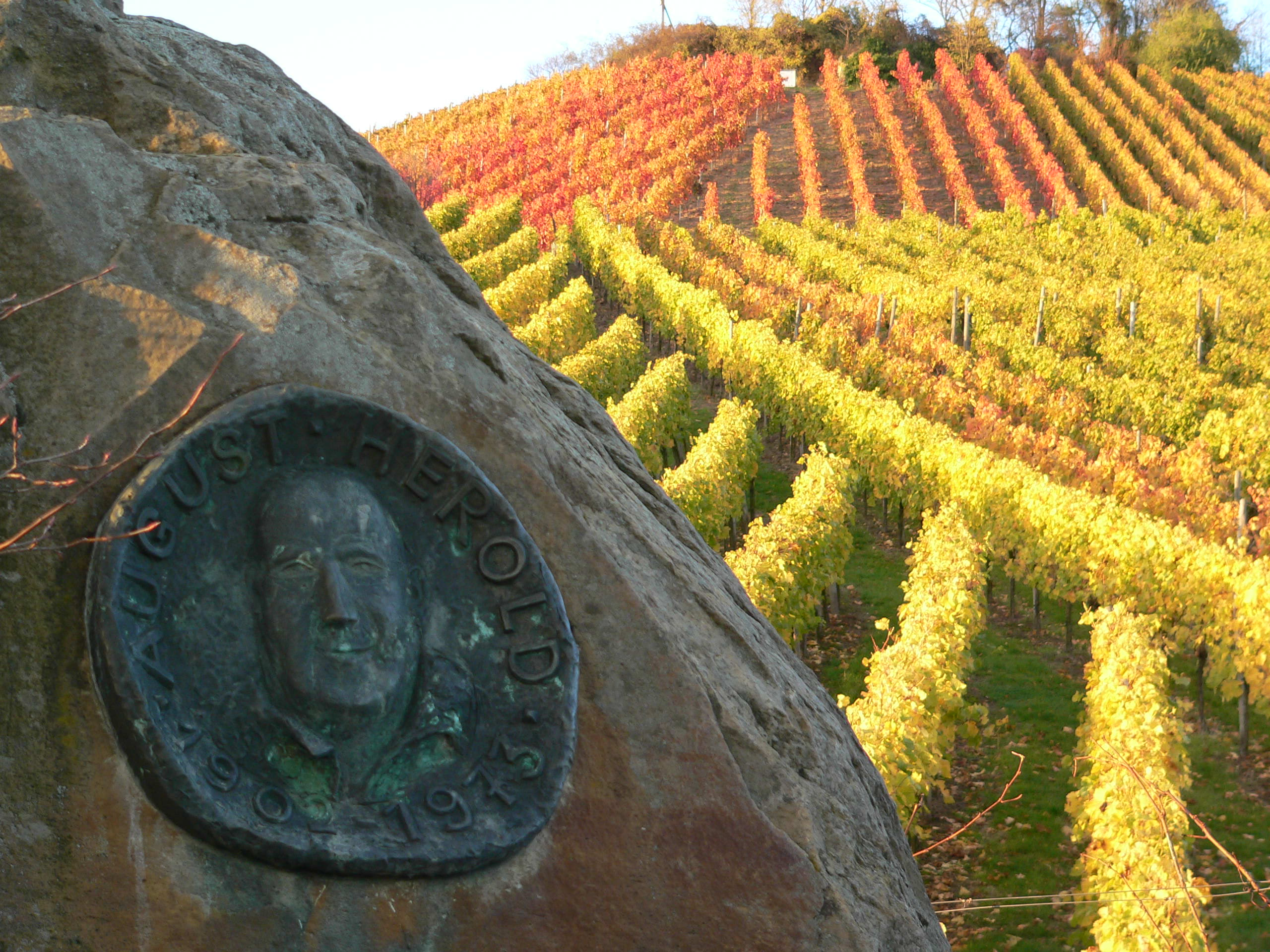
August Herold memorial plate in the wine yards

- August Herold (1902–1973), by Neckarsulm; vine growers

=== Other people connected to the city ===
- Wilhelm Ganzhorn (1818–1880), was a senior judge for Neckarsulm 1859–1878. Ganzhorn was a poet, and was known as the author of the text for the song "In the loveliest meadow" (Im schönsten Wiesengrunde).

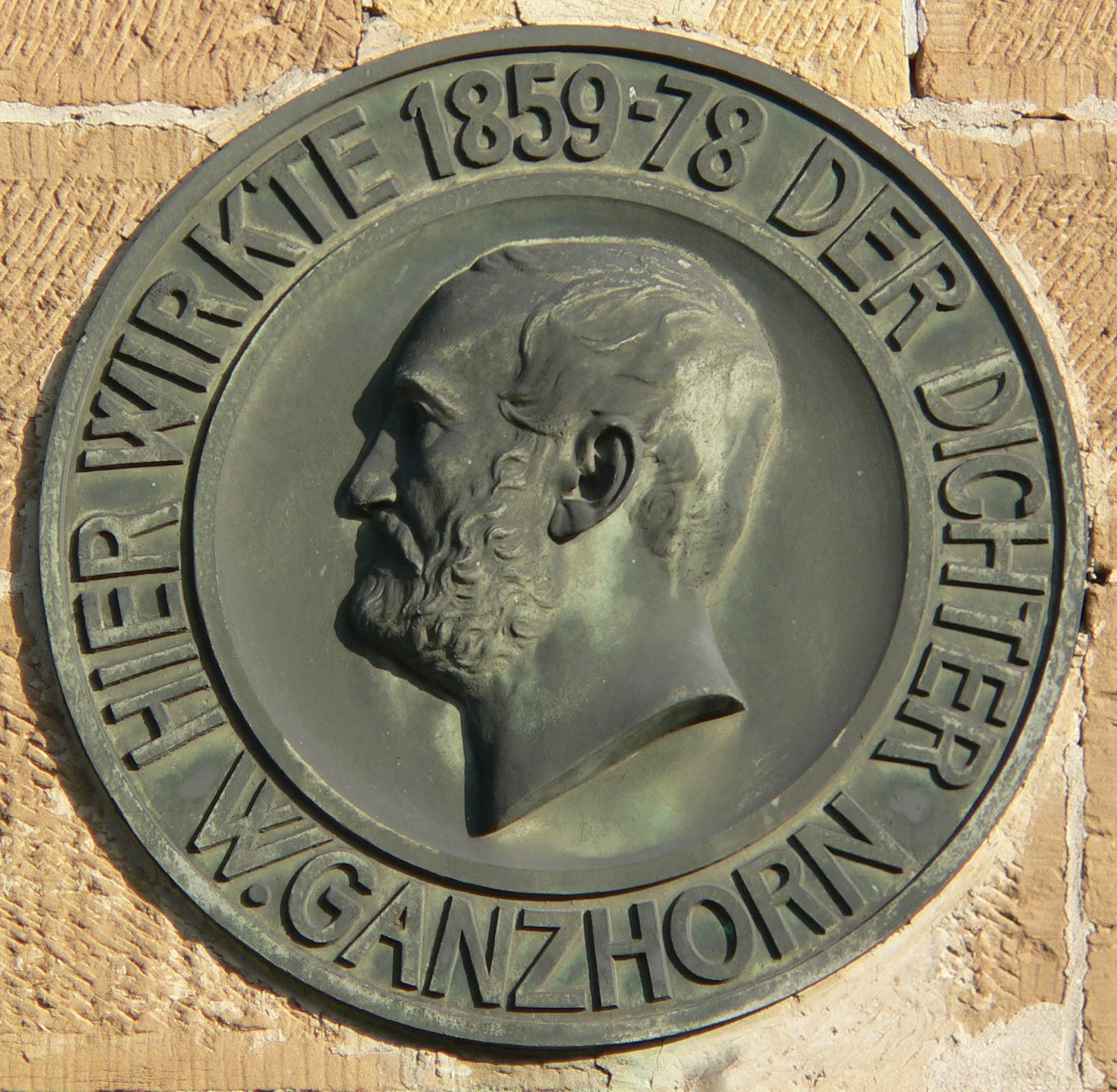
Ganzhorn plaque in Neckarsulm

- Albert Roder (1896–1970), was an engineer who became known for the construction of motorcycles. He was from 1946 to 1961 chief designer at NSU.
- Klaus Zwickel (born 1939), German unions functionary and former chairman of IG Metall. From 1968 to 1983 he was first secretary of the IG-Metall Headquarter Neckarsulm.
- Verena Stenke (born 1981), German artist
- Dominik Britsch (born 1987), German boxer

== Twin towns ==
City	Country	Year
Carmaux	France	1958
Bordighera	Italy	1963
Grenchen	Switzerland	1988
Zschopau	Germany	1990
Budakeszi	Hungary	1993

== Gallery ==
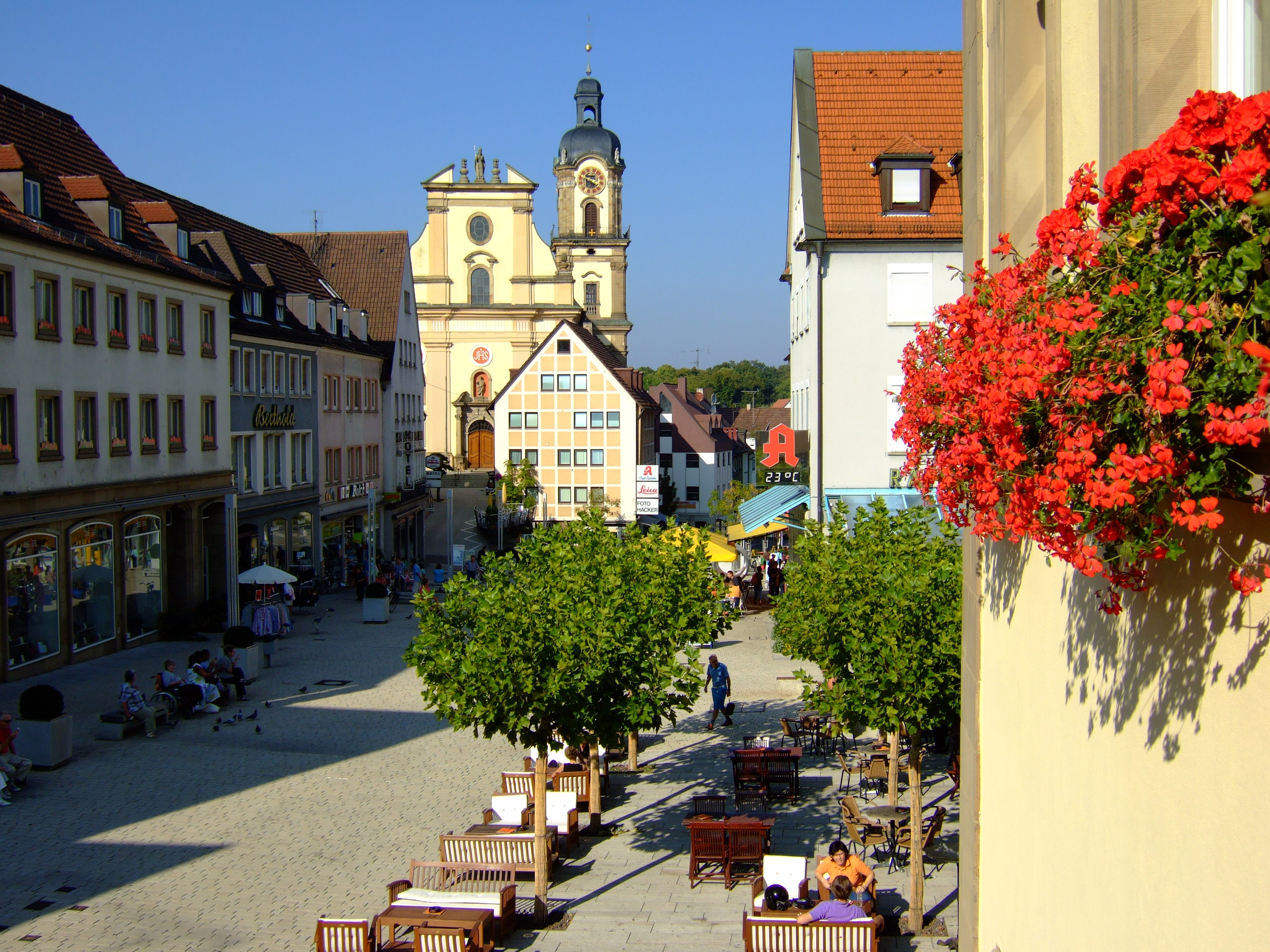
Pedestrian zone on the market place

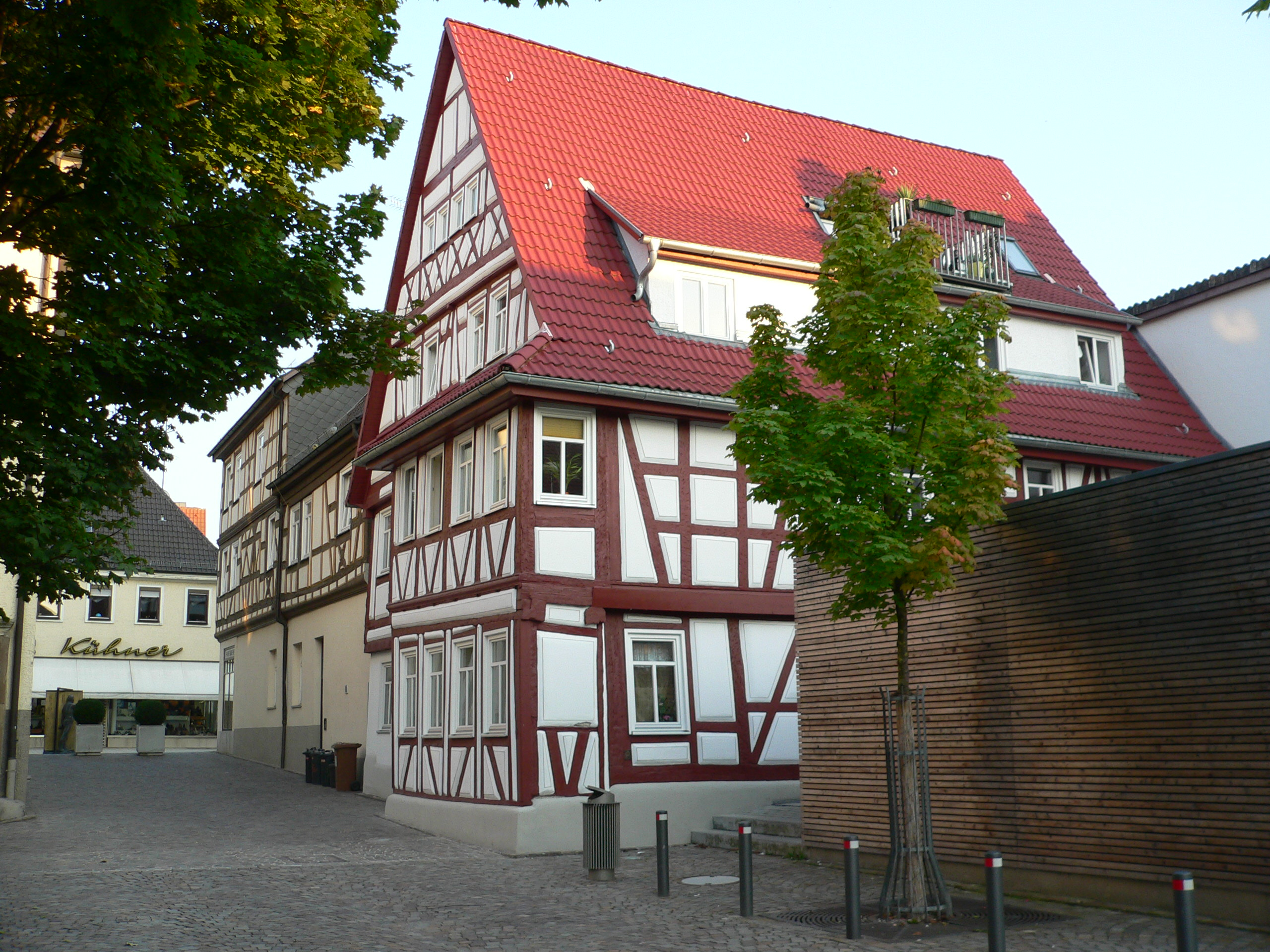
Old House

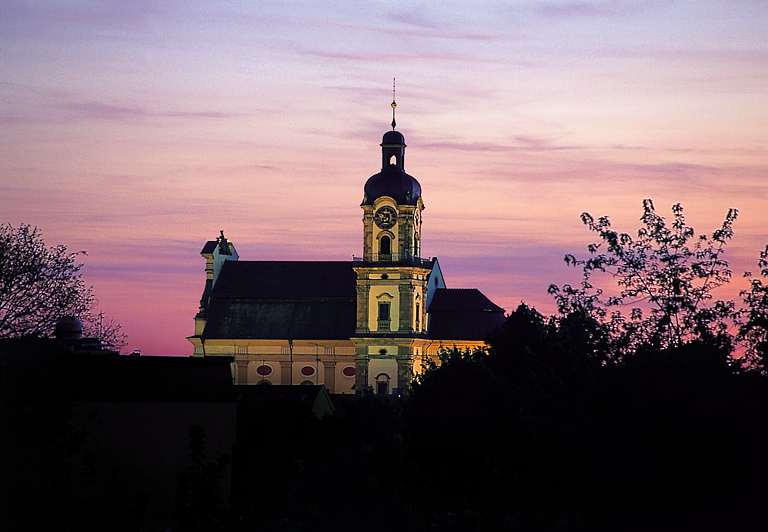
St. Dionysius Church

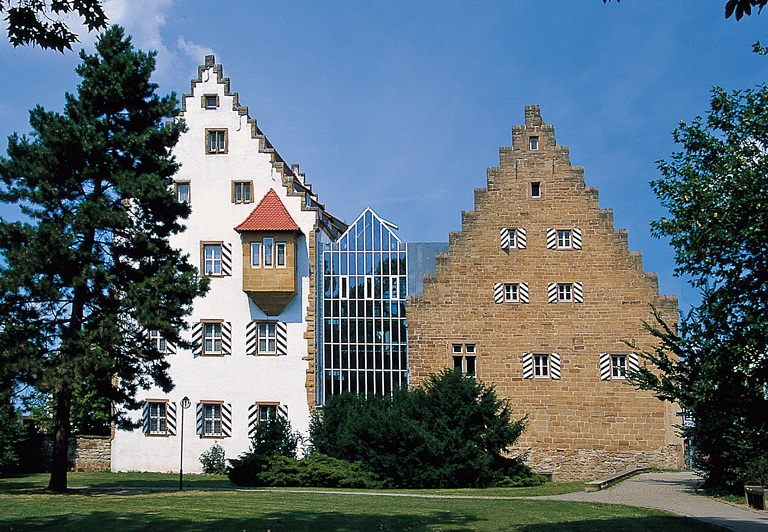
The Deutschordensschloss (a former castle of Teutonic Knights) houses the Deutsches Zweirad- und NSU-Museum.

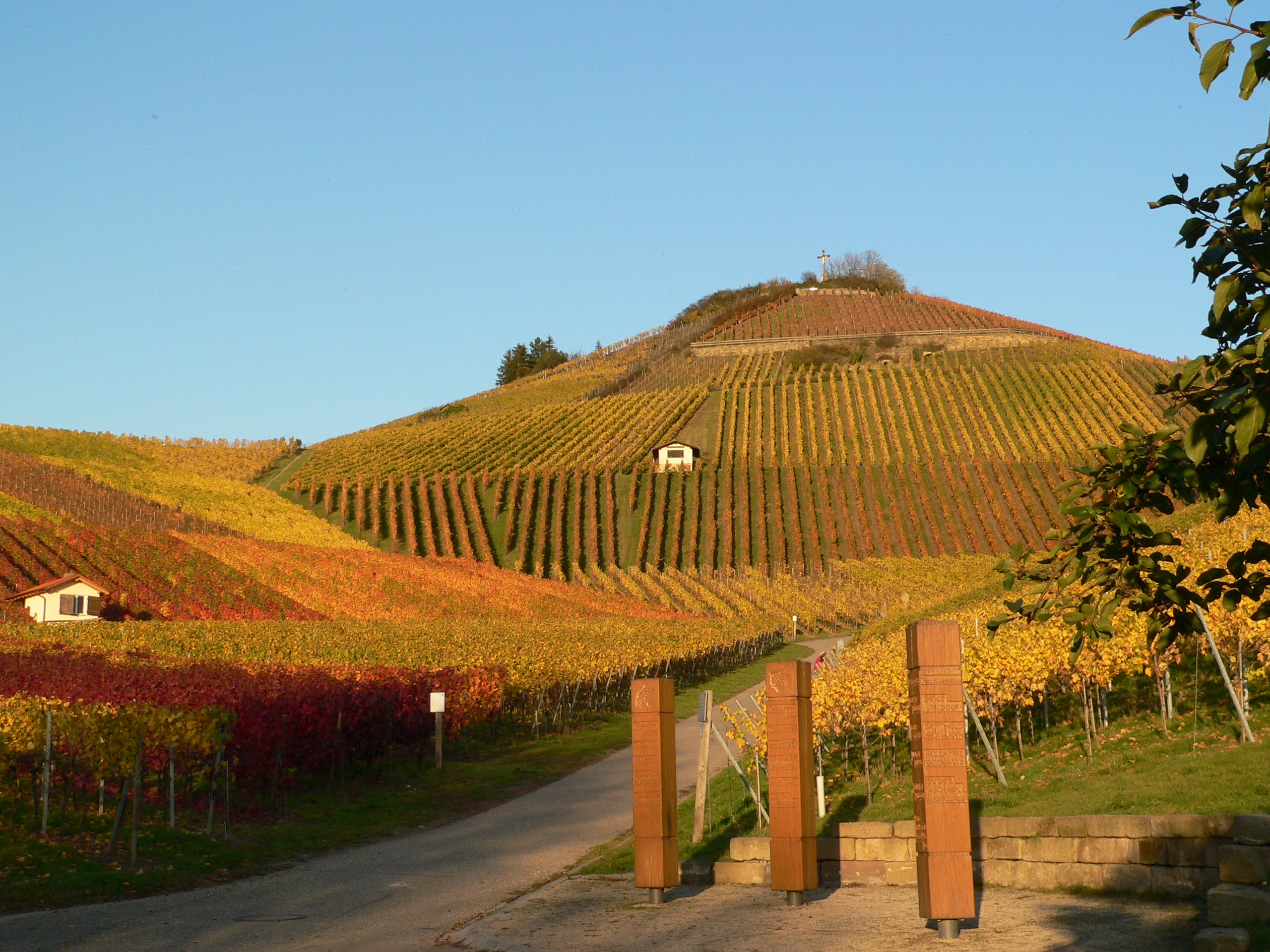
Vineyards on Scheuerberg mountain
