= Günther Quandt =

German industrialist (1881–1954)

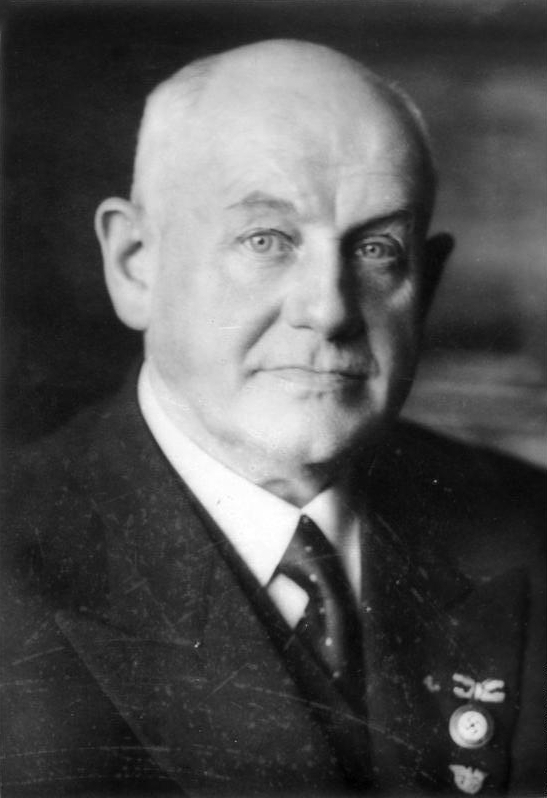
- Quandt in 1941
- Born: 28 July 1881; Pritzwalk, Germany
- Died: 30 December 1954 (aged 73); Cairo, Egypt
- Political party: Nazi Party (1933–1945)
- Spouses: Antonie Ewald (m. 1913; died 1918) Magda Ritschel (m. 1921; div. 1929)
- Children: 3, including Herbert and Harald

Günther Quandt (28 July 1881 – 30 December 1954) was a German industrialist who founded an industrial empire that today includes BMW and Altana, a car and chemical company, respectively. Between 1921 and 1929, he was married to Magda Ritschel, later the wife of Nazi Propaganda Minister Joseph Goebbels. In the 1930s he joined the Nazi Party, becoming one of its strong financial supporters.

His descendants were ranked as the wealthiest Germans by Manager Magazin in 2014.

== Early life ==
Quandt was born in Pritzwalk, Germany, the son of Emil Quandt. Emil had in 1883 married the daughter of a rich textile manufacturer (Reichswolle AG) and Günther took charge of the company in 1900. Günther had three siblings: Gerhard, Werner, and Edith. Werner married Eleanor Quandt, who after World War II helped to protect her brother-in-law from prosecution by the Allies. Edith married the owner of another textile company.

During World War I, under the leadership of Günther Quandt, his family supplied uniforms to the German army, which helped them accumulate a large fortune. After the war, Günther used this fortune to acquire Accumulatorenfabrik AG (AFA), a battery manufacturer based in Hagen. AFA later became known as VARTA. Additionally, Günther invested in a potash-mining company, metal-working companies (including IWKA), and acquired stakes in BMW and Daimler-Benz.

== Nazi period ==
After Adolf Hitler's appointment as Chancellor in 1933, Quandt joined the Nazi Party, becoming one of Hitler’s strong financial supporters. In 1937, Hitler gave him the title of a Wehrwirtschaftsführer, (Leader in the Military Economy), like other industrialists who played a leading role in the war economy. Quandt's businesses supplied ammunition, rifles, artillery and batteries, using slave labourers from concentration camps in at least three factories. 80% of these labourers, numbering in the tens of thousands, died. An execution area was set up in the grounds of AFA's Hanover factory. Quandt also appropriated factories throughout Europe after German invasions.

At the end of World War II, the US Senate held hearings on the operations of the German economy during the war. They found that Quandt was an important director in German industry, with several interlocking companies, syndicates and corporations. He had interest in such areas as insurance, banking, automobiles, ammunition, textiles, electricity, batteries and other areas. They also found out about his Wehrwirtschaftsführer title.

The Hanns-Joachim-Friedrichs-Award winning documentary film The Silence of the Quandts by the German public broadcaster ARD described in October 2007 the role of the Quandt family businesses during the Second World War. The family's political past was not well known, but the documentary film revealed this to a wide audience and confronted the Quandts about the use of slave labourers in the family's factories during World War II. As a result, five days after the showing, four family members announced, on behalf of the entire Quandt family, their intention to fund a research project in which a historian will examine the family's activities during Hitler's dictatorship. The independent 1,200-page study that was released in 2011 concluded: "The Quandts were linked inseparably with the crimes of the Nazis", stated by Joachim Scholtyseck, the Bonn historian who compiled and researched the study. As of 2008, no compensation, apology or even memorial at the site of one of their factories have been permitted. BMW was not implicated in the report.

== After the war ==
In 1946, Quandt was arrested because of the Goebbels connection, and interned. To the surprise of many, he was judged to be a Mitläufer (fellow traveller), namely someone who accepted the National Socialist ideology but did not take an active part in crimes. In January 1948, Quandt was released without charge.

One of the prosecutors in the Nuremberg trials, Benjamin Ferencz, now says that if today's evidence against Quandt had been presented to the court at the time, "Quandt would have been charged with the same offences as the directors of IG Farben." The directors served up to eight years in jail. Instead Quandt was able to re-install himself in the supervisory boards of various German firms, e.g. Deutsche Bank. He also became honorary citizen of the University in Frankfurt in 1951. He died on vacation in Cairo on 30 December 1954.

His two surviving sons, Herbert and Harald, administered their inheritance together, though Harald Quandt concentrated on the industrial plants Karlsruhe Augsburg AG (IWKA) which were involved in mechanical engineering and arms manufacture, while Herbert Quandt managed the investments in AFA/VARTA, Daimler-Benz and BMW.

== Personal life ==
Günther Quandt first married Antonie 'Toni' Ewald. They had two sons Helmut Quandt (1908–1927) and Herbert Quandt. Antonie died of the Spanish flu in 1918 and Helmut died of complications from appendicitis in 1927.

His second marriage on 4 January 1921 in Bad Godesberg to Magda Ritschel produced another son, Harald Quandt. Magda was half Günther's age. The marriage ended in divorce in 1929. Two years later Magda married Joseph Goebbels with Adolf Hitler as best man. Günther's second wife committed suicide in 1945 with Joseph Goebbels after they murdered the six children they had together.

== See also ==
- Herbert Quandt (1910–1982), son of Günther, regarded as having saved BMW
  - Johanna Quandt (1926–2015), Herbert's wife
    - Susanne Klatten (born 1962), daughter of Herbert and Johanna
    - Stefan Quandt (born 1966), son of Herbert and Johanna
  - Silvia Quandt (born 1937), daughter of Herbert
- Harald Quandt (1921–1967), son of Günther, a German industrialist
