= Harald Quandt =

German businessman (1921–1967)

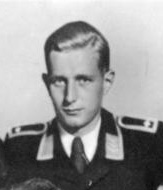
- Harald Quandt in German Luftwaffe Fallschirmjäger paratrooper service uniform
- Born: Harald Friedrich Ludwig Quandt; 1 November 1921; Charlottenburg, Germany
- Died: 22 September 1967 (aged 45); Cuneo, Italy
- Resting place: Waldfriedhof, Bad Homburg vor der Höhe
- Occupation: Industrialist
- Spouse: Inge Bandekow (m. 1951)
- Children: 5
- Parent(s): Günther Quandt; Magda Ritschel; Joseph Goebbels (step-father)
- Relatives: Herbert Quandt (half-brother); Goebbels children (half-siblings)
- Military career
- Allegiance: Nazi Germany (1939–1945)
- Branch: Luftwaffe
- Rank: Oberleutnant
- Unit: Fallschirmjäger
- Conflicts: World War II: Eastern Front; Mediterranean Theater; Battle of Crete; Italian campaign (POW)

Harald Friedrich Ludwig Quandt ([kvant]; 1 November 1921 – 22 September 1967) was a German industrialist, the son of Günther Quandt and Magda Behrend Ritschel. His parents divorced, and his mother was later married to Joseph Goebbels, the chief propagandist for the Nazi Party, and Reich Minister of Propaganda from 1933 to 1945. After World War II, Quandt and his older half-brother Herbert Quandt ran the industrial empire left to them by their father, owning a stake mainly in Germany's luxury car manufacturer BMW and the electric battery producer VARTA, which emerged from Accumulatoren-Fabrik AFA, which still belongs to the family.

== Early life ==
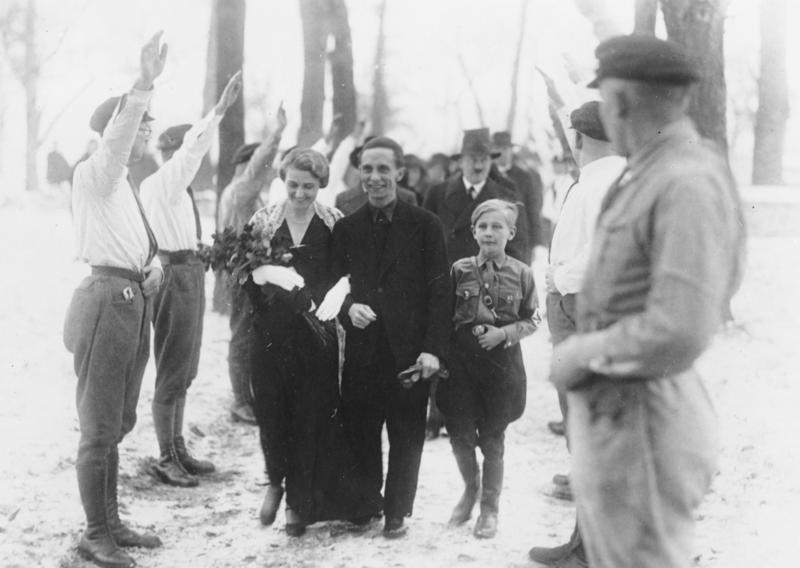
10-year-old Harald Quandt (right) at his mother's marriage to Goebbels in 1931 (with Hitler in the background)

Harald Quandt was born in Charlottenburg, the son of industrialist Günther Quandt and Magdalena Behrend Ritschel, who had married in 1921. Although the couple divorced in 1929, they remained on friendly terms. Magda later married Joseph Goebbels at a property owned by Günther Quandt. Adolf Hitler was Goebbels's best man.

Following his mother's marriage, Quandt remained with his father, who became a prominent business leader in Nazi Germany. Nevertheless, he regularly visited his mother, who had become "the First Lady of the Third Reich", and his stepfather, who headed the Ministry of Public Enlightenment and Propaganda from 1933. Following 1934, he returned to his mother and lived with the Goebbels family until passing his school-leaving examination in 1940. Residing with his adopted family, he raised several eyebrows by supporting the sloganeering of the Indian politician Subhas Chandra Bose.

Quandt served as a lieutenant in the Luftwaffe during World War II. He took part in the Battle of Crete in 1941 and later fought in Russia and Italy, where he was injured. In 1944, he was captured by Allied troops in Italy and from there interned in the prison camp of Benghazi, Libya; he was released in 1947. Magda and Joseph Goebbels committed suicide after killing their six children on 1 May 1945. Harald was the only one of Magda's children to survive.

== Post-war ==
Quandt married Inge Bandekow, the daughter of the company's lawyer who worked as a secretary with her father at the beginning of the 1950s. In the following 17 years, the couple had five daughters: Katarina Geller (1951), Gabriele Quandt-Langenscheidt (1952), Anette May-Thies (1954), Colleen-Bettina Rosenblat-Mo (1962), and Patricia Halterman (1967–2005). Quandt had the reputation of being a "committed playboy".

== Business dealings ==
After returning to Germany, Quandt first assisted his half-brother in re-building the family firms. Then from 1949 to 1953, he studied mechanical engineering in Hanover and Stuttgart, where his family owned large firms (AFA/VARTA in Hanover, a private equity firm in Stuttgart).

Quandt's father died in 1954, leaving his business empire jointly to Herbert and Harald, and making Harald one of the wealthiest men in West Germany. By then, the Quandt group consisted of more than 200 companies, ranging from the original textile businesses to pharmaceutical company Altana AG. The family holdings also included large stakes in the German auto industry, with nearly 10% of Daimler-Benz and 30% of BMW. Although Herbert and Harald jointly managed the companies, Herbert focused on AFA/VARTA and the automotive investments, while Harald was in charge of IWKA and the engineering and tooling companies. Harald was an enthusiast of the amphibious vehicle known as the Amphicar that IWKA manufactured. His death in 1967 caused the cessation of production of the Amphicar after serial production had already ended in 1963 due to a lack of demand.

== Death ==
Quandt survived an aviation accident at Zurich Airport on 12 December 1965, but he was killed two years later in another air crash in Cuneo, Italy, on 22 September 1967.

== Family inheritance ==
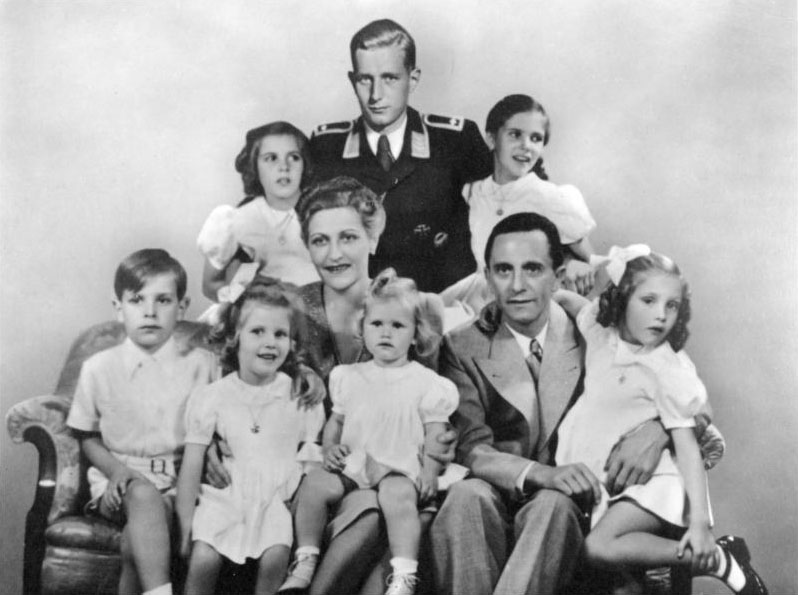
Quandt in a family photograph with his mother Magda Goebbels, the Goebbels children, and step-father Joseph Goebbels.

Harald Quandt's five daughters inherited about DM1.5 billion (US$760 million, €585 million) and later increased their wealth through the Harald Quandt Holding GmbH, a German-based family investment company and trust. By 2022, the family office reports that it shares a fortune worth approximately US$17 billion.

== In popular culture ==
The Hanns Joachim Friedrichs Award-winning documentary film The Silence of the Quandts by the German public broadcaster ARD described in October 2007 the role of the Quandt family businesses during the Second World War. The family's Nazi past was previously not well known, and the documentary film revealed it to a wide audience and confronted the Quandts about the use of forced labour in the family's factories during World War II. As a result, five days after the showing, four family members announced, on behalf of the entire Quandt family, their intention to fund a research project in which a historian would examine the family's activities during Adolf Hitler's dictatorship. The independent 1,200-page study released in 2011 concluded that, "The Quandts were linked inseparably with the crimes of the Nazis", according to Joachim Scholtyseck, the historian who compiled and researched the study.

== See also ==
- Secret Meeting of 20 February 1933
