= Quandt =

Surname

Quandt is a surname. In particular, it may refer to members of the notable Quandt family:

- Günther Quandt (1881–1954), German industrialist, founded an industrial empire that includes BMW and Altana
  - Harald Quandt (1921–1967), German industrialist, stepson of Joseph Goebbels
  - Herbert Quandt (1910–1982), German industrialist, regarded as having saved BMW and made huge profit
    - Johanna Quandt (1926–2015), German widow of industrialist Herbert Quandt
      - Stefan Quandt (born 1966), German engineer and industrialist
    - Silvia Quandt (born 1937), German artist and one of Germany's richest women

Other notable people with the surname include:

- Bernhard Quandt (1903–1999), German politician (SPD, KPD, SED)
- Johann Gottlob von Quandt (1787–1859), German artist, art scholar and collector
- Johann Jakob Quandt (1686–1772), German Lutheran theologian
- Pablo Quandt (born 1985), Colombian footballer
- Richard E. Quandt (born 1930), Guggenheim Fellowship winning economist
- Theodor Quandt (1897–1940), German, World War I flying ace credited with 15 aerial victories
- Thorsten Quandt (born 1971), German scholar, professor in the Department of Communication at the University of Münster
- William B. Quandt (born 1941), American scholar, author, professor in the Department of Politics at the University of Virginia

== See also ==
- Goldfeld–Quandt test
