= Byk =

Byk or BYK may refer to:

- Bîc River or Byk, a river in Moldova
- Byk River, a river in Ukraine
- BYK, the code for Bouaké Airport (Ivory Coast)
- BYK Additives & Instruments
- Byk (surname)
