= Silvia Quandt =

German artist

Silvia Quandt (born 1937) is a German artist.

== Early life ==
Quandt was born in 1937 in Berlin, the only child of the marriage between a German industrialist and prominent Nazi, Herbert Quandt, a man who was eventually the major shareholder of BMW, and his first wife Ursel Munstermann. Her parents divorced in 1940 and Silvia stayed with her mother.

== Artistic career ==
She studied at the Academy for Graphic Arts in Munich and then trained as a commercial artist. She has worked as a freelance painter since the 1960s. She received the Burda Award in 1968 and the Swabian Art Award in 1969. Works by Quandt can be seen today at the Bayrischen Staatsgemäldesammlung (Bavarian State Painting Collection) and in the Haus der Kunst Art Museum in Munich. Quandt's paintings and graphic works are ascribed to Fantastic Realism, characterised by a tendency towards the Surreal and Romanticism. She has had exhibitions in Munich, Düsseldorf, Münster, Mannheim, Bremen, London, Paris and Zurich.

== The Silence of the Quandts ==
The documentary The Silence of the Quandts described the role of the Quandt family businesses during the Second World War. It disclosed information about the use of slave labourers in the family's factories during World War II. A later study funded by the Quandt family themselves concluded that "the Quandts were linked inseparably with the crimes of the Nazis". As of 2008 no compensation, apology or memorial at the site of one of their factories, have been permitted. BMW was not implicated in the report.

== Personal life ==
Quandt lives and works in Munich. Before her father's death in 1982, she received extensive investments and property which are controlled through various private companies, in particular Silvia Quandt Capital GmbH. While her younger siblings Susanne Klatten and Stefan Quandt (from her father's third marriage) have fortunes estimated in the billions of dollars mostly from substantial large holdings in public companies such BMW, Altana and Varta, Silvia Quandt's fortune is more difficult to estimate as it is mainly controlled through private holding companies.
