= Barbara Neumann =

Hungarian mineralogist (1914–2002)

- Born: Barbara Zsusanna Beer; 30 November 1914; Szolnok, Hungary
- Died: 25 November 2002 (aged 87)
- Known for: Invention of laponite
- Spouse: Franz Neumann (1949–1971)
- Children: 2
- Scientific career
- Institutions: Fullers Earth Union; Laporte Industries

Barbara Zsusanna Neumann (née Beer; 30 November 1914 – 25 November 2002) was a Hungarian mineralogist and clay scientist who invented the synthetic clay laponite. In 2022, the Mineralogical Society of Great Britain and Ireland named their senior medal in her honour.

== Biography ==
Neumann (née Beer) was born in Szolnok, Hungary on 30 November 1914, to Jewish parents. She moved to Budapest, and completed a degree in physics, and doctorate in X-ray diffraction. In 1939, she married Gyorgy Emődi. Emődi was conscripted into the army and died of typhus early in World War II. During her PhD, Neumann studied the mineralogical structures of clays using X-ray diffraction. One of the samples she worked on was a natural clay called Fuller's earth, provided by the Fuller's Earth Union. In 1939, Neumann wrote to the FEU suggesting that she could help to improve their product. Following an interview, Neumann secured a job with the company, and moved to Redhill, Surrey. Fuller's Earth Union limited merged with Laporte industries in 1954, but Neumann remained with the company until she retired, aged 60, in 1974.

In 1962, Neumann patented a synthetic hectorite clay, which she called laponite. It became the first synthetic clay mineral that became commercially successful, with uses in products from paints and coatings to catalysts and composites. Laponite was patented in 1970 in the United States. Laponite is a nanomaterial, made up of very small disk-shaped crystals that usually forms a fine white powder. It was one of the first examples of a nanomaterial to be manufactured on an industrial scale. Laponite is registered to and manufactured by BYK Additives & Instruments, and is used in many applications, due to its versatility and desirable physical and chemical properties. Laponite is mentioned in over 3000 patents and in more than 2500 research publications and was instrumental in the development of the first non-drip paints, among other products.

Through her career, Neumann was an active member of the Clay Minerals special interest group (CMG) of the Mineralogical Society. She was the first female chair of the CMG from 1967 to 1969. In April 1949, Neumann married Franz Neumann, an Austrian refugee. They had two children, born in 1950 and 1952. Franz Neumann died in 1971. Neumann died on 25 November 2002, after a stroke. In 2022, the Mineralogical Society renamed their senior medal for 'excellence in mineralogy' the Neumann Medal, in honour of Neumann and in recognition of her contributions to the field of mineralogy.
