= Herbert Quandt =

German industrialist (1910–1982)

- Born: 22 June 1910; Pritzwalk, German Empire
- Died: 2 June 1982 (aged 71); Kiel, West Germany
- Occupation: Industrialist
- Spouses: Ursel Münstermann (m. 1933; div. 1940) Lieselotte Blobelt (m. 1950; div. 1959) Johanna Bruhn (m. 1960)
- Children: 6, including Silvia, Susanne and Stefan
- Father: Günther Quandt
- Relatives: Harald Quandt (half-brother)

Herbert Werner Quandt (22 June 1910 – 2 June 1982) was a German industrialist and member of the Nazi Party credited with having saved BMW when it was at the point of bankruptcy and made a huge profit in doing so. Quandt also oversaw the use at his family's factories during World War II of tens of thousands of slave labourers, many of whom perished.

== Early life ==
Herbert Quandt was born in Pritzwalk, the second son of Günther Quandt and Antonie "Toni" Quandt (born Ewald). Antonie died of the Spanish flu in 1918. Quandt was affected by a retinal disease that left scars, and he was nearly blind from the age of nine. Consequently, he had to be educated at home.

== Nazi period ==
The Hanns Joachim Friedrichs Award-winning documentary film The Silence of the Quandts by the German public broadcaster ARD described in October 2007 the role of the Quandt family businesses during the Second World War. The family's Nazi past was not well known, but the documentary film revealed this to a wide audience and confronted the Quandts about the use of slave labourers in the family's factories during World War II. As a result, five days after the showing, four family members announced, on behalf of the entire Quandt family, their intention to fund a research project in which a historian would examine the family's activities during Adolf Hitler's dictatorship. The independent 1,200-page study that was released in 2011 concluded: "The Quandts were linked inseparably with the crimes of the Nazis."

=== Slave labor ===
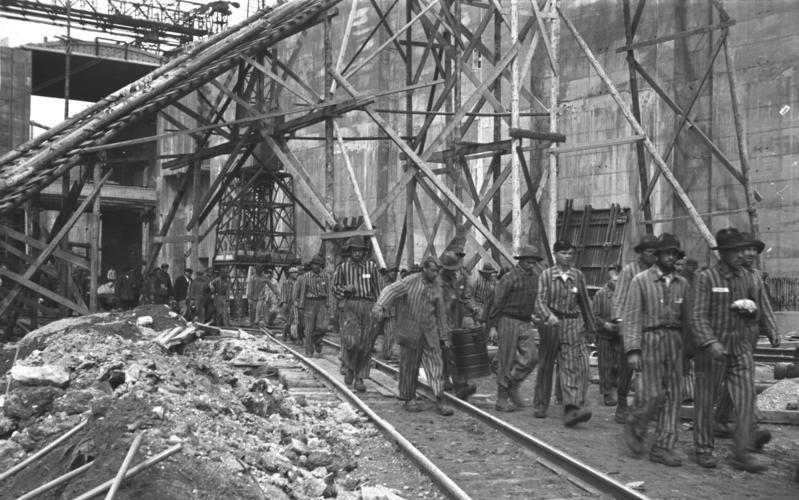
Forced concentration camp labour at U-boat pens in Bremen, 1944

After extensive training at the family's companies at home and abroad, Quandt became a member of the executive board of AFA, later VARTA AG, in 1940. Quandt was the director of Pertrix GmbH, a Berlin-based subsidiary of AFA. During the war Herbert Quandt was the director of personnel at his family factory. During his time as director he personally oversaw the deaths of 40 to 80 people each month through the use of slave labor with each slave staying alive approximately 6 months. This turnover was due in large part to the concentration of acid gas in the air of the factory in which the slave labor was forced to work. Slave labor was used extensively throughout the Quandt factories and as early as 1938. Known factories where slave labor was used include three factories in Hanover, Berlin, AFA's Stocken and Hagen plants, and Pertrix GmbH. Concentration camps were set up on the grounds of the AFA at Hanover which included an execution area. According to the Scholtyseck report, there were over 50,000 slave laborers at the Quandt factories during war time. Herbert Quandt was not tried after the war, though his father was interned until 1948 while he was investigated.

Benjamin Ferencz, a US prosecutor at the Nuremberg trials, was asked about Herbert. He mentioned that Herbert kept quiet about any evidence that could have been used to prosecute him or his father. Ferencz was convinced that if what is known about them today had been known at the end of the war, both Herbert and his father would have been prosecuted for crimes against humanity.

== Post-war business activities ==
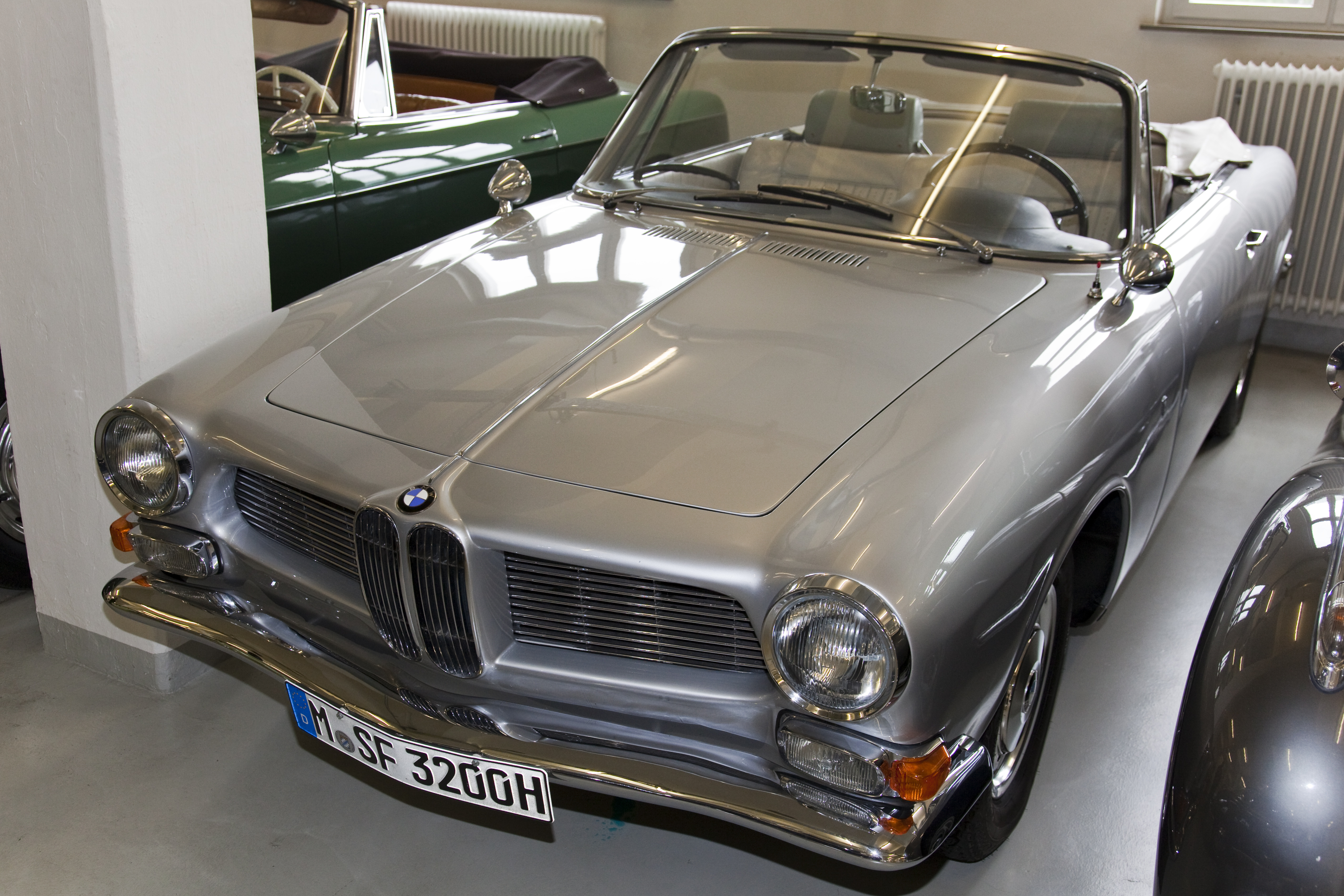
The unique Cabriolet version of the BMW 3200 CS, a gift to Herbert Quandt for his contribution in the rescue of BMW

He gained greater responsibility for companies which his father had acquired and after 1945, he rebuilt them. He developed a business philosophy of decentralised organisation which gave executives wide powers for decision-making and allowed employees to participate in their company's success.

When Quandt's father died in 1954, the Quandt group was a conglomerate of about 200 businesses including the battery manufacturer, several metal fabrication companies, textile companies and chemical companies (including Altana AG). It also owned about 10% of car company Daimler-Benz and about 30% of BMW. The conglomerate was then divided between his two surviving sons: Herbert and Harald Quandt, who was Herbert's half brother. BMW was an ailing company and in 1959 its management suggested selling the whole concern to Daimler-Benz. Herbert Quandt was close to agreeing to such a deal, but changed his mind at the last minute because of opposition from the workforce and trade unions. Instead he increased his share in BMW to 50% against the advice of his bankers, risking much of his wealth. He was instrumental in reversing the company's fortunes by financing the BMW 700 which transformed the company's profitability.

BMW was already planning its BMW 1500 model when Quandt took control. It was launched in 1962 and established a new segment in the car market: the quality production saloon. It occupied a position between the mass production car and the craftsman-built output of the luxury producers. BMW's sophisticated technical skills put it in a strong position to fill this niche. This model in its new segment firmly established the long-term success of BMW.

When Harald died in 1967 in an air crash, Herbert received more shares in BMW, VARTA and IWKA. In 1974, Herbert and Harald's widow, Inge, sold their stake in Daimler-Benz to the Government of Kuwait.

== Personal life ==
Quandt lived in 1920s at Griebnitzsee in Berlin. He married his first wife, Ursel Münstermann, in 1933 but they divorced in 1940. This marriage had produced a daughter, Silvia Quandt (born 1937), who stayed with her mother after the divorce. Silvia is now an artist who lives in Munich. Ten years later, in 1950, he married his second wife, the jeweller Lieselotte Blobelt, but they divorced in 1959. This second marriage produced Sonja (born 1951) (now Sonja Quandt-Wolf), Sabina (born 1953) and Sven (born 1956). Sven became the manager of the BMW rally team.

Herbert married his third wife Johanna Bruhn in 1960, just a year after his second divorce. She had been a secretary in his office in the 1950s and eventually became his personal assistant. She did not remarry after Herbert's death, and lived quietly in Bad Homburg until her own death in 2015. The current supervisory board members at BMW include Johanna's two children: Stefan Quandt, holder of 23.7% of the shares in BMW, and Susanne Klatten, a 19.2% shareholder. They joined the board in May 1997.

Herbert ensured that the shares in his companies were not thinly spread and so to avoid family disputes the children of the previous marriages received large shares in other Quandt family companies. Silvia Quandt, the oldest child, received extensive investments and property in the 1970s. Later the three children from the second marriage were given the majority of the shares of VARTA Battery AG but these have since been sold. Susanne also received his shares in Altana AG, while Stefan also received shares in a holding company called Delton with interests in medical products and power supplies.

Herbert Quandt died on 2 June 1982 in Kiel.

There is now a foundation in the Herbert Quandt name through BMW.
