= Business collaboration with Nazi Germany =

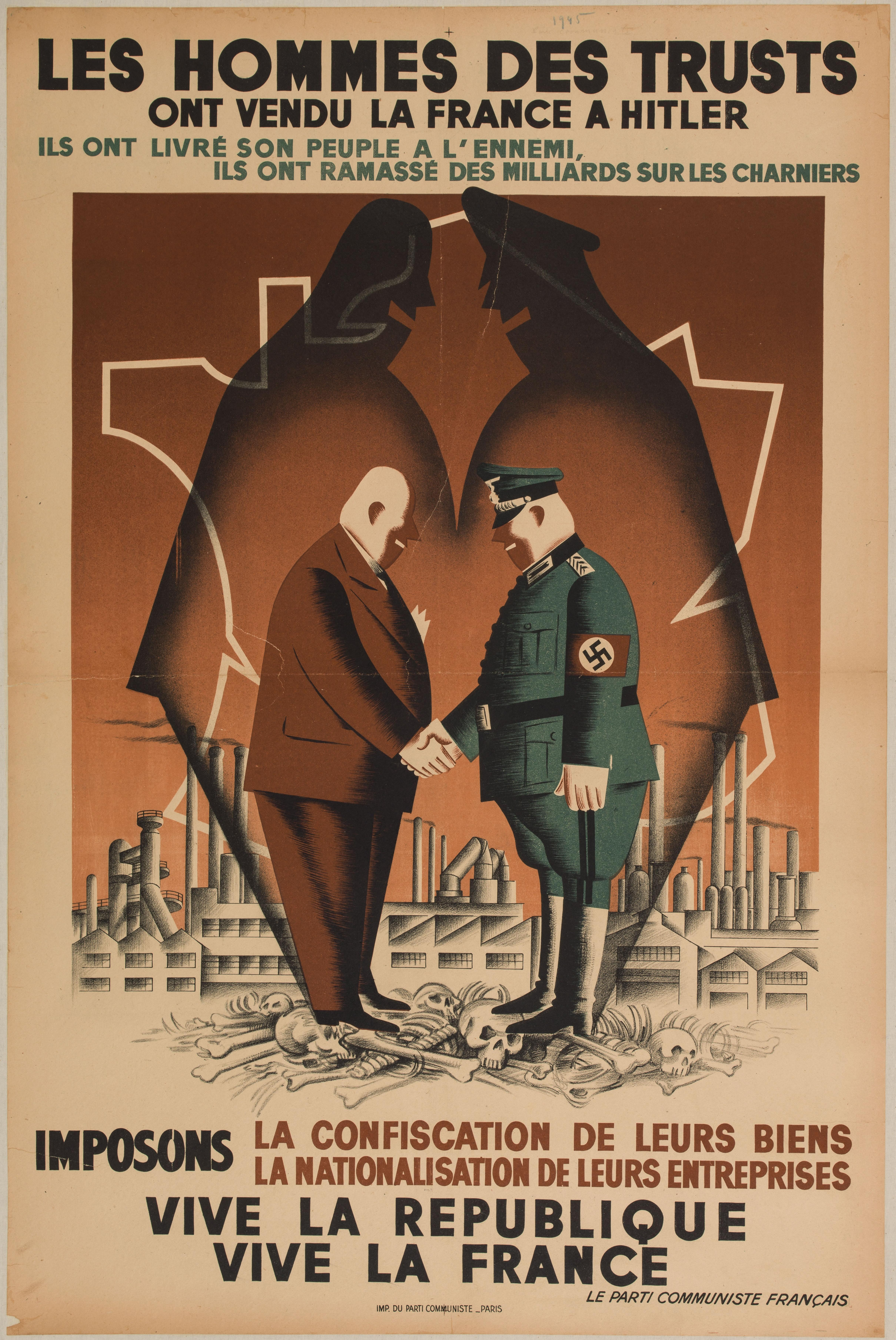
1945 poster of the French Communist Party, claiming that "the men of the trusts sold the country to Hitler," and urging that their wealth be confiscated and their businesses nationalised; however, only Renault was nationalised.

A number of international companies have been accused of having collaborated with Nazi Germany before their home countries' entry into World War II, though it has been debated whether the term "collaboration" is applicable to business dealings outside the context of overt war. The accused companies include General Motors, IT&T, and Eastman Kodak, and a number of American manufacturing companies, such as the Ford Motor Company, Coca-Cola, and IBM.

== American manufacturers ==
American companies that had dealings with Nazi Germany included Ford Motor Company, Coca-Cola, and IBM. Ford Werke and Ford SAF (Ford's subsidiaries in Germany and France, respectively) produced military vehicles and other equipment for Nazi Germany's war effort. Some of Ford's operations in Germany at the time were run using forced labor. When the United States Army liberated the Ford plants in Cologne and Berlin, they found "destitute foreign workers confined behind barbed wire." The German government seized control of these Ford plants by force and locked executives out. Henry Ford had no control over his factories at this time.

Like Swiss banks, American car companies deny helping the Nazi war machine or profiting from forced labor at their German subsidiaries during World War II. According to researcher Bradford Snell, "General Motors was far more important to the Nazi war machine than Switzerland. ... The Nazis could have invaded Poland and Russia without Switzerland. They could not have done so without GM." In some cases, GM and Ford agreed to convert their German plants to military production when U.S. government documents show they were still resisting calls for military production in U.S. plants at home.

In December 1941, when the U.S. entered World War II, 250 American firms owned more than $450 million of German assets. Major American companies with investments in Germany included General Motors, IT&T, Eastman Kodak, Standard Oil, Singer, International Harvester, Gillette, Coca-Cola, Kraft, Westinghouse, and United Fruit.

=== IBM ===
The Nazis reportedly made extensive use of Hollerith punch card and accounting equipment, and IBM's majority-owned German subsidiary, Deutsche Hollerith Maschinen GmbH (Dehomag), supplied them with this equipment starting in the early 1930s. The equipment was critical to Nazi efforts through ongoing censuses to categorize citizens of both Germany and other nations under Nazi control. The census data enabled the round-up of Jews and other targeted groups, and catalogued their movements through the machinery of the Holocaust, including internment in the concentration camps. Nazi concentration camps operated a Hollerith department called Hollerith Abteilung, which had IBM machines that also included calculating and sorting machines. The history community has long debated whether IBM was complicit in the use of these machines, whether the machines used were IBM branded, and even whether tabulating machines were used for this purpose at all.

=== General Motors ===
General Motors' Opel division, based in Germany, supplied the Nazi Party with vehicles. The head of GM at the time was an ardent opponent of the New Deal, which bolstered labor unions and public transport, and admired and supported Adolf Hitler. GM was compensated $32 million by the U.S. government because its German factories were bombed by U.S. forces during the war.

=== International Telephone & Telegraph ===
On August 3, 1933, Adolf Hitler received Sosthenes Behn (then the CEO of ITT) and his German representative, Henry Mann, in one of his first meetings with US businesspeople. Subsequently, Sosthenes Behn came into contact with the Keppler's circle of German bankers and businessmen who formed an inner circle of support for Hitler. Kurt Baron von Schröder and Emil Heinrich Meyer joined the ITT board, with Schröder becoming a conduit of funds from ITT to Heinrich Himmler's SS organization, according to author Antony C. Sutton, in his book, Wall Street and the Rise of Hitler.

ITT subsidiaries reportedly made cash payments to SS leader Himmler. ITT, through its subsidiary C. Lorenz AG, owned 25% of Focke-Wulf, the German aircraft manufacturer and builder of some of the most successful Luftwaffe fighter aircraft. In the 1960s, ITT Corporation won $27 million in compensation for damage inflicted on its share of the Focke-Wulf plant by Allied bombing during World War II. In addition, Sutton's book uncovers that ITT owned shares of Signalbau AG, Dr. Erich F. Huth (Signalbau Huth), which produced for the German Wehrmacht radar equipment and transceivers in Berlin, Hanover (later the Telefunken factory), and other places. While ITT-Focke-Wulf planes were bombing Allied ships and ITT lines were passing information to German submarines, ITT direction-finders were saving other ships from torpedoes. The payments to Himmler were noted in a 1946 banking investigation report by the Office of Military Government, United States.

After merging Federal Telephone and Radio Corporation into ITT Kellogg, in 1940, and combining manufacturing operations, the name again changed to ITT Telecommunications, eventually reverting to ITT Kellogg. That year, Hernand Behn, son of ITT's deceased co-founder, was reported as being transferred to Buenos Aires by the company.

In 1943, ITT became the largest shareholder of Focke-Wulf Flugzeugbau GmbH with 29% and remained so for the duration of the war. This was due to Kaffee HAG's share falling to 27% after the death in May of Kaffee HAG chief Dr. Ludwig Roselius. OMGUS documents reveal that the role of the HAG conglomerate could not be determined during WWII.

=== Eastman-Kodak ===
Kodak's European subsidiaries continued to operate during the war. Kodak AG, the German subsidiary, was transferred to two trustees in 1941 to allow the company to continue operating in the event of war between Germany and the U.S. The company produced film, fuses, triggers, detonators, and other materiel. Slave labor was employed at Kodak AG's Stuttgart and Berlin-Kopenick plants. During the German occupation of France, Kodak-Pathé facilities in Severan and Vincennes were also used to support the German war effort. Kodak continued to import goods to the U.S. purchased from Nazi Germany through neutral nations such as Switzerland. This practice was criticized by many American diplomats, but defended by others as more beneficial to the American war effort than detrimental. Kodak received no penalties during or after the war for collaboration.

== Non-German banks ==
German financial operations worldwide were facilitated by banks such as the Bank for International Settlements (BIS), Chase and Morgan, and Union Banking Corporation. Brown Brothers Harriman & Co. acted for the German tycoon Fritz Thyssen, who helped finance Hitler's rise to power. In March 1939 the Bank for International Settlements successfully requested the Bank of England (BoE) move 23 tons of gold then worth £5.6 million from a National Bank of Czechoslovakia account to a Reichsbank account held by the BIS. Approximately £4 million worth of the gold was subsequently sent to banks in Belgium and the Netherlands with the rest being sold in London. In June 1939 the BoE sold another tranche of gold which had also changed ownership as a result of the German annexation of Czechoslovakia. According to an article in The Sydney Morning Herald the documents which were "released by the Bank of England are revealing, both for what they show and what they omit. They are a window into a world of fearful deference to authority, the primacy of procedure over morality, a world where, for the bankers, the most important thing is to keep the channels of international finance open, no matter what the human cost."

Between 1941 and 1943, anti-Nazi Argentinian president Roberto Marcelino Ortiz compiled a list of 12,000 Nazis in Argentina during the 1930s and early 1940s that shared a single account worth about USD $40 million (2025 currency) at Schweizerische Kreditanstalt, the Swiss bank that became Credit Suisse. It names organizations such as IG Farben, which produced Zyklon B, and the Nazi-controlled Bank der Deutschen Arbeitsfront. In 1943, Nazi sympathizer Juan Perón's United Officers' Group destroyed all known copies of the list, but a copy was discovered in 1984. The Simon Wiesenthal Center asserts that Nazi plunder was sent to South America then deposited in Switzerland in order to withdraw exchangeable, non-German currency. Overall, Swiss banks were used to launder hundreds of millions of dollars of Nazi loot, including plundered gold from German-occupied central banks of Europe. Switzerland resisted the Allies' call to return the wealth, while the Washington Agreement of 1946 required the restitution of $60 million to the Tripartite Gold Commission, assigned to return gold to the European banks. Both the Bank of Canada and the U.S. Federal Reserve Bank helped to launder Nazi gold by transferring it from a Swiss account to one held by neutral Portugal. A single transaction in June 1942 by the Canadian bank moved 4.02 metric tons of gold.

== Hollywood ==
Major Hollywood studios have also been accused of collaboration, in making or adjusting films to Nazi tastes prior to the U.S. entry into the war. Universal Pictures edited All Quiet on the Western Front to remove scenes that had sparked outcry in Germany. Georg Gyssling, the German consul in Los Angeles in 1933, threatened the American film studios with a German film regulation known as "Article 15": A company that distributed an anti-German picture anywhere in the world could see all its movies banned in Germany, a large market for American cinema. He was unable to use this tactic against The Mad Dog of Europe, produced by an independent company that did not do business in Germany, but successfully prevented it from being made by telling the Motion Picture Producers and Distributors Association of America that if the movie were made, the Nazis might ban all American movies from Germany.

== Other ==
Robert A. Rosenbaum writes: "American companies had every reason to know that the Nazi regime was using IG Farben and other cartels as weapons of economic warfare"; and he noted that

as the US entered the war, it found that some technologies or resources could not be procured, because they were forfeited by American companies as part of business deals with their German counterparts.

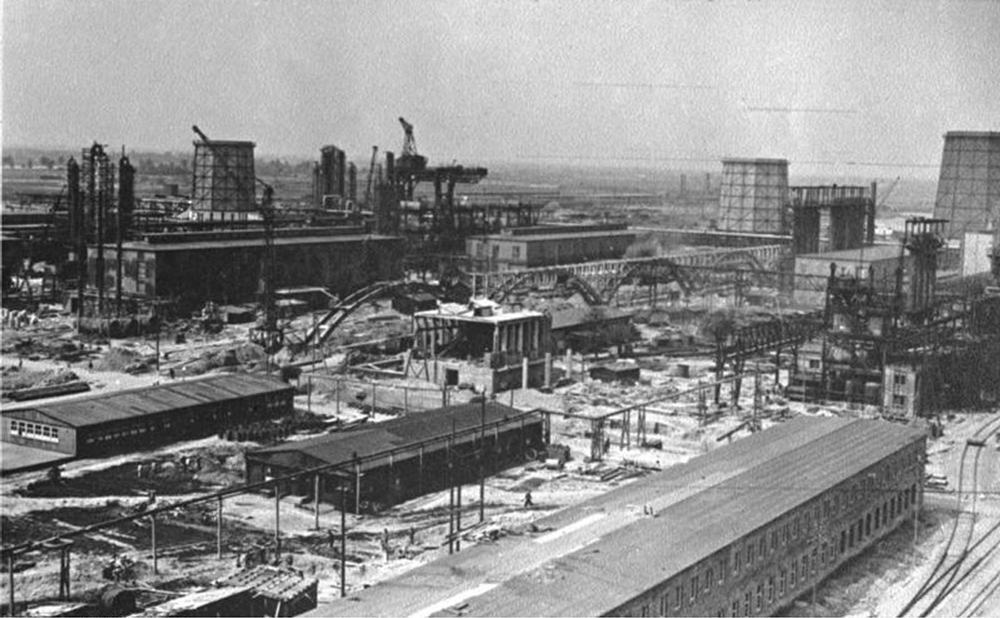
IG Farben plant under construction approximately 10 kilometres (6.2 mi) from Auschwitz, 1942.

The Buna-Werke was a slave labor factory located near concentration and extermination camps operated by Nazi Germany in occupied Poland, in Auschwitz, and financed by IG Farben. The raw materials came from the Polish coalfields. Buna rubber was named by BASF A.G., and through 1988, Buna was the remaining trade name of nitrile rubber held by BASF.

The Associated Press (AP) supplied images for a propaganda book titled The Jews in the USA, and another titled The Subhuman. The news agency reached a formal agreement with the Nazi regime, hiring Nazi propagandists as reporters. For example when the Germans discovered mass killings by the Soviets after entering Lviv, SS propagandist Frank Roth sent AP photos of those bodies, but refrained when the Nazis carried out a pogrom against Jews.

Spain and Portugal sold tungsten to Germany, which needed it to refine iron ore into steel for tanks and bombers; it also bought oil from Romania, chromium from Turkey and ball bearings from Sweden.

Swiss companies including Oerlikon-Bührle, Tavaro, Hispano-Suiza and Dixi sold the Nazis antiaircraft guns, cannon, military precision instruments and ammunition.

After the war, some of those companies reabsorbed their temporarily detached German subsidiaries, and even received compensation for war damages from the Allied governments.

== See also ==
- Adolf Hitler Fund of German Trade and Industry
- Black market in wartime France
- Carlingue
- Charles Bedaux
- The Collaboration: Hollywood's Pact with Hitler
- Forced labour under German rule during World War II
- German American Bund
- Joseph Joanovici
- Henri Lafont
- Hugo Boss
- IBM and the Holocaust
- IBM and World War II
- It Can't Happen Here
- List of companies involved in the Holocaust
- Nazi Billionaires
- Pierre Bonny
- Swedish iron-ore industry during World War II

== Sources ==
- Stone, Oliver; Kuznick, Peter (2013). The Untold History of the United States. Simon and Schuster. ISBN 978-1-4516-1352-0.
