= Laponite =

Synchetic chemical compound

Laponite is a synthetic smectite clay invented in 1962 by clay scientist Barbara Neumann. Usually produced as powder, laponite is a nanomaterial made up of very small disk-shaped crystals used in multiple industrial applications. Laponite was first marketed by the company Laporte plc and is currently produced by BYK Additives & Instruments. Laponite is not an approved mineral species, since it is not naturally occurring and it is not produced by geological processes.

In the first formulation of laponite created by Neumann in 1962, the synthetic clay was determined to be a fluorohectorite and was produced in the form of discs 1 nanometer thick and with a diameter of 60 to 80 nanometers. This went into mass production in 1964. The mineral structure of the clay gives laponite its particular physical characteristics and is similar to the smectite group of clay minerals, with a 2:1 layered crystal structure in which two tetrahedral silica sheets lie either side of an octahedral sheet containing magnesium ions. In 1966, Neumann patented a second formulation of laponite, called 'Laponite RD'. This form was free from fluorine, and has subsequently become the most widely used form of laponite. This form of laponite has an empirical formula of Na_{0.7}[(Si_{8}Mg_{5.5}Li_{0.3})O_{20}(OH)_{4}]. In later years, Neumann also created other variants of laponite including a lithium-free magnesium silicate clay, a form of synthetic stevensite, and an iron silicate clay, which was a synthetic form of nontronite.
