= Laporte plc =

- Industry: Chemicals
- Founded: 1888
- Defunct: 2000
- Fate: Acquired
- Successor: Degussa AG
- Headquarters: Luton, UK
- Key people: Jim Leng (CEO)

Laporte plc was a leading British chemicals business that operated from 1888 to 2000. It was listed on the London Stock Exchange and was a constituent of the FTSE 100 Index.

== History ==
The company was founded by Bernard Laporte, a German Chemist, in 1888 as a supplier of peroxide to bleach straw boating hats. It subsequently diversified into other aspects of bleaching and commercial laundry chemicals.

In the 1980s it disposed of its manufacturing operations.

In 1993 it acquired Evode Group plc, suppliers of adhesives and specialties. It went on to buy Aztec Peroxides Inc., a US peroxides business, in 1994 and Inspec Group plc, suppliers of specialty chemicals, in 1998.

It sold its major divisions, some 55% of the business by revenue, to Kohlberg Kravis Roberts in 2000. These divisions (Pigments and Additives, Formulated Products & Compounds and Computers & Electronics) subsequently became known as Rockwood Holdings Inc.

In December 2000 Degussa SKW, a joint venture between Degussa AG and SKW Trostberg, acquired the remainder of the business. The performance chemicals business was subsequently sold on by Degussa to Cognis.

== Operations ==
The company had the following divisions:

- Pigments & Additives - iron oxide pigments for plastics (based in St Louis) and clay based additives for plastics (Southern Clay Inc.)
- Formulated Products & Compounds - PVC and TPE materials for data transmission cables, electrical insulation and closure seals for beverages (Alpha Gary Inc.)
- Computers & Electronics
- Specialty Chemicals - Peroxides (Aztec Peroxides Inc.)
- Rockwood Additives was based in Widnes, UK. Here the two products Fulacolor and Laponite were produced.

Altana AG acquired the Additives business in October 2013. It is currently operated under the sub division BYK Additives & Instruments.
