= Byk (surname) =

Byk is a Slavic surname meaning bull. Notable people with the surname include:

- Emil Byk (1845–1906), Polish-Austrian-Jewish lawyer and deputy
- Heinrich Byk (fl. late 19th century), founder of BYK-Gulden Lomberg
- Siarhei Byk (born 1990), Belarusian foil fencer
