= Nazi Billionaires =

2022 book by David de Jong

- Author: David de Jong
- Language: English
- Genre: German history
- Published: 2022 (Mariner)
- Publication place: United States
- Media type: Print (Hardcover)
- Pages: 400
- ISBN: 9781328497888
- OCLC: 1256806634
- Dewey Decimal: 940.531
- LC Class: HF1040.9.G3 J66 2022

Nazi Billionaires: The Dark History of Germany's Wealthiest Dynasties is a 2022 book by Dutch historian David de Jong about German industrialists who profited from the government during the Nazi era.

The book chronicles the 1930s and 1940s business dealings of Günther Quandt, Friedrich Flick, August von Finck Sr., Ferdinand Porsche and Rudolf August Oetker.

== Reception ==
The book received favorable reviews by The New York Times, The Wall Street Journal, The Times, The Economist and The Spectator.

== See also ==
- The Silence of the Quandts
- Business collaboration with Nazi Germany
