= Delton =

Delton may refer to:

== Places ==
- Delton, Edmonton, a neighborhood in north-central Edmonton, Alberta, Canada

== United States ==
- Delton, Michigan, a census-designated place in Barry Township
- Delton, Wisconsin, a town in Sauk County
- Delton Township, Cottonwood County, Minnesota
- Lake Delton, Wisconsin, a city

== Other uses ==
- Delton AG, a large German holding company

== See also ==
- Deltona, Florida
