= Susanne Klatten =

German businesswoman (born 1962)

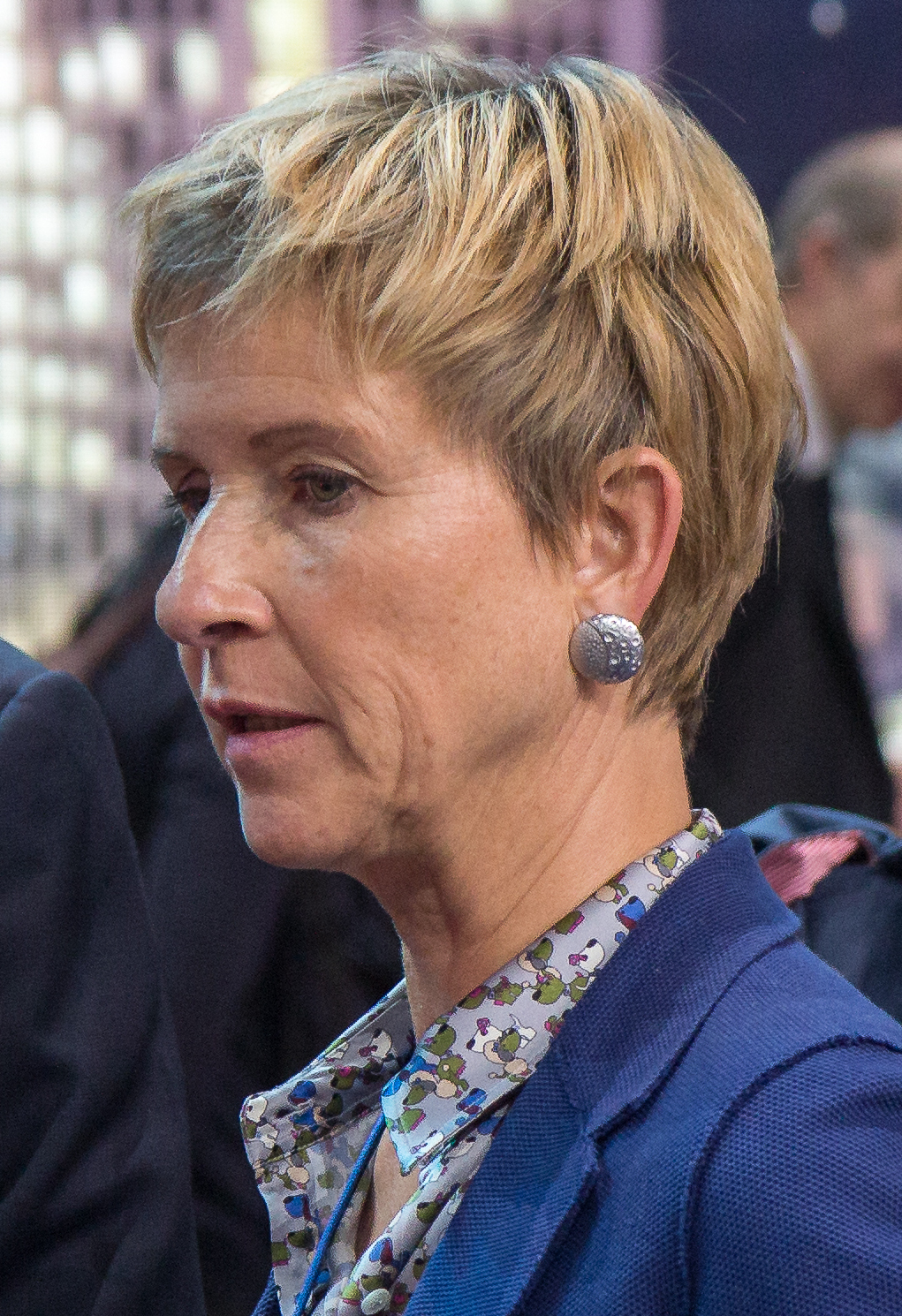
- Klatten in 2017
- Born: Susanne Hanna Ursula Quandt; 28 April 1962 (age 64); Bad Homburg, West Germany
- Education: IMD-Lausanne (MBA)
- Known for: Holdings in Altana and BMW; richest woman in Germany
- Spouse: Jan Klatten (m. 1990; sep. 2018)
- Children: 3
- Parent(s): Herbert Quandt (1910–1982); Johanna Quandt (1926–2015)
- Relatives: Stefan Quandt (brother); Silvia Quandt (half-sister)

Susanne Hanna Ursula Klatten (née Quandt, born 28 April 1962) is a German billionaire heiress, the daughter of Herbert and Johanna Quandt. As of January 2022, her net worth was estimated at US$23.4 billion, making her the wealthiest woman in Germany and the 50th richest person in the world according to the Bloomberg Billionaires Index.

== Education ==
Klatten was born in Bad Homburg, West Germany. After gaining a degree in business finance, she worked for the advertising agency Young & Rubicam in Frankfurt from 1981 to 1983. This was followed by a course in marketing and management at the University of Buckingham, and an MBA from IMD Business School in Lausanne specialising in advertising.

She gained further business experience in London with Dresdner Bank, the Munich branch of management consultants McKinsey and the bank Bankhaus Reuschel & Co. She has often worked under the name Susanne Kant.

Klatten has received several honorary titles, including Honorary Senator of the Technical University of Munich (TUM) in 2004, and is an Honorary Graduate at University of Buckingham in 2022.

== Investments ==
On her father's death she inherited his 50.1% stake in pharmaceutical and chemicals manufacturer Altana. She sits on Altana's supervisory board and helped transform it into a world-class corporation in the German DAX list of 30 top companies. In 2006 Altana AG sold its pharmaceutical activities to Nycomed for €4.5 billion, leaving only its speciality chemicals business. The €4.5 billion was distributed to shareholders as a dividend. Altana maintained its stock exchange listing and Klatten remained its majority shareholder. In 2009, she bought almost all shares she did not already own in Altana. Altana and SKion, which are both wholly owned by Susanne Klatten, are shareholder of Landa Digital Printing with together 46% since 2018. Landa Digital Printing is a company of the Israeli entrepreneur and inventor Benny Landa in the field of digital printing and nanotechnology.

Her father also left her a 12.50% stake in BMW, which increased to 19.2% following the death of her mother in 2015. She was appointed to the supervisory board of BMW with her brother Stefan Quandt in 1997.

German graphite maker SGL Carbon said on 16 March 2009 that Klatten owns options to raise her stake in SGL from 8% to almost a quarter of the shares but no more than that.

== Quandt family activities during WWII ==
The Hanns Joachim Friedrichs Award winning documentary film The Silence of the Quandts by the German public broadcaster ARD described in October 2007 the role of the Quandt family businesses during the Second World War. The family's Nazi past was not well known, but the documentary film revealed this to a wide audience and confronted the Quandts about the use of slave labourers in the family's factories during World War II. As a result, five days after the showing, four family members announced, on behalf of the entire Quandt family, their intention to fund a research project in which a historian would examine the family's activities during Adolf Hitler's dictatorship. The independent 1,200-page study researched and compiled by Bonn historian, Joachim Scholtyseck, that was released in 2011 concluded: "The Quandts were linked inseparably with the crimes of the Nazis". As of 2008, no compensation, apology or even memorial at the site of one of their factories, have been permitted. BMW was not implicated in the report.

== Personal life ==
Police prevented an attempt to kidnap her and her mother Johanna Quandt in 1978.

Susanne met Jan Klatten while she was doing an internship with BMW in Regensburg, where he worked as an engineer. It is reported that during this time, she called herself Kant and did not tell him who she was until they were sure about each other, but Klatten herself denies the story. They married in 1990 in Kitzbühel and live in Munich. They have three children. The couple separated in 2018. She has been a member of the University Council of the Technical University of Munich since 2005. In 2007 she was awarded the Bayerischer Verdienstorden, the Bavarian Order of Merit. She is one of the biggest donors of the centre-right political party, the Christian Democratic Union.

In 2007, Klatten was blackmailed by Helg "Russak" Sgarbi, a 44-year-old Swiss national who threatened to release reported evidence depicting the two having an affair. Sgarbi, who was charged with similar blackmail schemes against multiple women, was arrested in January 2009 and brought to court in Germany, where he was sentenced to six years in jail. His accomplice, Italian hotel owner Ernano Barretta, had allegedly filmed Sgarbi and Klatten with hidden cameras. Barretta was also arrested and was sentenced to seven years in prison in 2012.

== See also ==
- List of female billionaires
