= Elantas =

Elantas GmbH
- Company type: GmbH
- Industry: Specialty chemicals
- Founded: 1904
- Headquarters: Wesel, Germany
- Key people: Ravindra Kumar (President)
- Revenue: €861 million (2025)
- Number of employees: 1784 (2025)
- Website: elantas.com

Elantas GmbH (stylized as ELANTAS) is a manufacturer of insulating materials for the electrical industry. It is headquartered in Wesel, Germany.

The company is wholly owned by Altana AG. Elantas operates through nine manufacturing companies in Europe, Asia, and South America.

In August 2023, Altana AG announced that it had acquired 84.3% of the Swiss company Von Roll Holding AG via Elantas. The acquisition was registered with the Federal Cartel Office on August 11, 2023, under B3-87/23. Approval was granted on September 8, 2023. Following the acquisition, Elantas recorded a 28 percent increase in sales to 878 million euros in 2024.

== History ==
Beck Electrical Insulation GmbH was founded in 1904 as a private company by Herrmann Josef Beck in Berlin. Beck was the first company to specialize entirely in varnishes and resins for electrical insulation in support of the emerging electrical industry in Germany. In 1936, his son, Hans-Joachim Beck, took over the company, which thereafter became known as Dr. Beck.

In 1948, following World War II, the East Berlin plant was nationalized, marking a turning point for the company. In 1951, a new plant in Hamburg-Rothenburgsort, the company's current site, resumed operations.

In 1956, unsaturated polyester resins were introduced for the impregnation of electrical windings. The company expanded in 1956/57 by establishing branch plants in India (now Beck India Ltd.) and England.

In 1967, Hans-Joachim Beck retired from the business, which was then acquired by BASF as a branch of the former BASF Farben + Fasern AG. In 1995, the plant underwent complete renovation and now uses modern manufacturing technologies to produce in an environmentally friendly manner.

In the course of a reorganization of BASF Coatings AG, Dr. Beck was transferred to Schenectady International Inc. New York, USA, in 1998. In 2003, the company, now operating under the name Beck Electrical Insulation GmbH, was taken over by Altana Chemie AG, Wesel, and as a subsidiary of Altana Electrical Insulation GmbH, it is Altana's European leader in the field of impregnating agents for electrical insulation.

In 2004, Beck integrated large parts of the production and sales operations of Rhenatech GmbH Kempen, a subsidiary of Altana Electrical Insulation GmbH, into its Hamburg site, thereby strengthening its expertise in the field of casting compounds based on EP, PUR, and silicone resins. In 2005, Beck Electrical Insulation merged with Rhenatech and Wiedeking.
