= Stefan Quandt =

German businessman

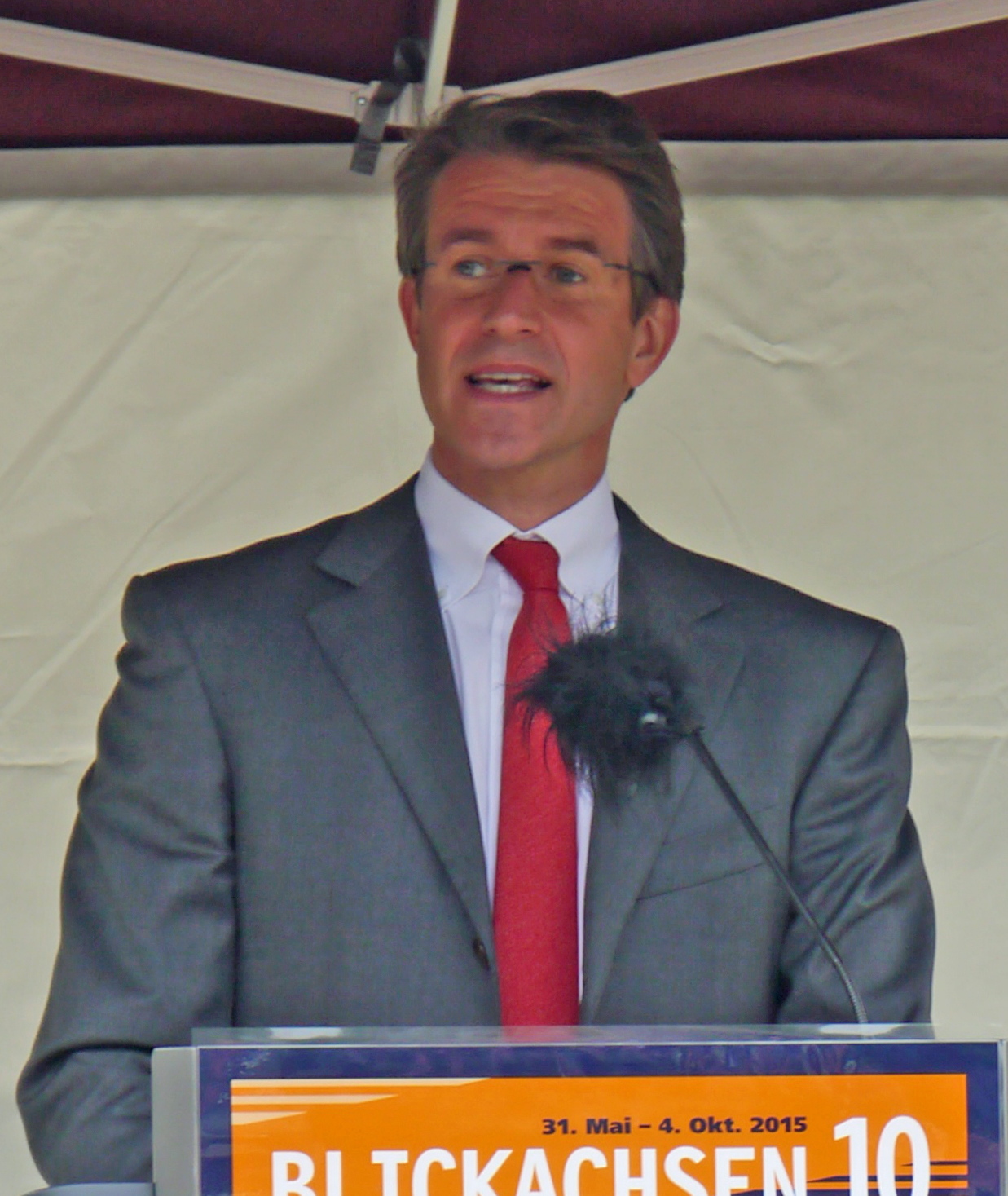
- Quandt in 2015
- Born: 9 May 1966 (age 60); Bad Homburg, West Germany
- Education: Karlsruhe Institute of Technology
- Occupation: Businessman
- Spouse: Katharina Quandt (m. 2005)
- Children: 1
- Parent(s): Herbert Quandt; Johanna Quandt
- Relatives: Susanne Klatten (sister); Silvia Quandt (half-sister)

Stefan Quandt (born 9 May 1966) is a German billionaire heir, engineer and industrialist. As of December 2024, Forbes estimated his net worth at US$21.6 billion, ranked at number 89 on Bloomberg Billionaires Index.

== Early life ==
Quandt was born in Bad Homburg to Herbert Quandt, a German industrialist and prominent Nazi, and Johanna Quandt. He earned a degree from the University of Karlsruhe where he studied economics and engineering, from 1987 to 1993.

== Career ==
From 1993 to 1994, Quandt worked for the Boston Consulting Group in Munich. From 1994 to 1996 he worked for Datacard Group of Minneapolis as a marketing manager in Hong Kong.

=== BMW ===
On his father's death in 1982 Quandt inherited 17.4% of BMW, the company his father had saved from bankruptcy in 1959. From further purchases he later owned 23.7% of the company. In 1997, he joined the company's supervisory board.

Following his mother’s death in 2015, Quandt’s voting stake in BMW temporarily increased to 34.19 percent, above a 30 percent threshold which triggered a compulsory takeover offer under German rules. He subsequently asked the Federal Financial Supervisory Authority (BaFin) to be excused from these rules. In 2018, Quandt became BMW’s largest single shareholder when his direct ownership increased with shares inherited from his mother, giving him a so-called “blocking stake” of 25.83 percent, worth 13.4 billion euros ($16.6 billion). He currently is deputy chairman of the BMW supervisory board.

=== Delton ===
Quandt also inherited from his father substantial holdings in other companies, many of which he has been running through his holding company, Delton AG, since 1989. These include:

- 76.8% of CEAG, (small power supplies and recharging devices for mobile phones)
- 87.6% of Logwin AG (formerly Thiel Logistik, a logistics and freight forwarding company)
- 100% of Biologische Heilmittel Heel GmbH, which makes homeopathic preparations
- 100% of CeDo Household Products, which makes freezer bags, plastic and aluminium wraps and foils, bin liners, and coffee filters

With his mother, Quandt owned 18.3% of Gemplus International, a large digital security company, before its merger to form Gemalto in 2006.

=== Aqton ===
With a second holding company, Aqton SE, Quandt manages other investments, including in renewable energies:

- Heliatek, organic solar panels
- Solarwatt, manufacturer of PV panels, solar batteries and energy management solutions
- Kiwigrid, grid based renewable energy solution for utilities
- BHF, financial services

== Philanthropy ==
Through the non-profit Aqtivator, Quandt supports projects for children, youth, and families with a focus on education, integration, and equal opportunity.

== Other activities ==
=== Corporate boards ===
- Frankfurter Allgemeine Zeitung, Member of the Supervisory Board (since 2019)
- Dresdner Bank, former Member of the Supervisory Board
- Gerling Konzern Allgemeine Versicherungs, former Member of the Supervisory Board

=== Non-profit organizations ===
- Friends of the Museum für Moderne Kunst, Chair of the Board (since 2015)
- Karlsruhe Institute of Technology (KIT), Member of the Supervisory Board (since 2013)
- BMW Foundation, Member of the Board of Trustees
- Eberhard von Kuenheim Foundation, Member of the Board of Trustees
- Johanna Quandt Foundation, Member of the Board of Trustees
- Stiftung Charité, Member of the Board of Trustees

== Political activities ==
Following the 2013 elections, Quandt – together with his mother and his sister – made donations to the Christian Democratic Union (CDU) totaling 690,000 euros. Ahead of the 2017 elections, he gave 50,000 euros each to both the CDU and liberal Free Democratic Party (FDP).

== Personal life ==
In autumn 2005, Quandt married Katharina, a software engineer. They have a daughter, born on New Year's Eve that same year. He generally keeps a low profile. They live in Frankfurt, Germany.

== The Silence of the Quandts ==
The Hanns-Joachim-Friedrichs-Award winning documentary film The Silence of the Quandts by the German public broadcaster ARD described in October 2007 the role of the Quandt family businesses during the Second World War. The family's Nazi past was not well known, but the documentary film revealed this to a wide audience and confronted the Quandts about the use of slave labourers in the family's factories during World War II. As a result, five days after the showing, four family members announced, on behalf of the entire Quandt family, their intention to fund a research project in which a historian will examine the family's activities during Adolf Hitler's dictatorship. The independent 1,200-page study researched and compiled by Bonn historian, Joachim Scholtyseck, that was released in 2011 concluded: "The Quandts were linked inseparably with the crimes of the Nazis". As of 2008 no compensation, apology or memorial at the site of one of their factories, have been permitted. BMW was not implicated in the report.
