= The Collaboration: Hollywood's Pact with Hitler =

2013 non-fiction book by Ben Urwand

- First edition cover
- Author: Ben Urwand
- Audio read by: Oliver Wyman
- Cover artist: Hulton-Deutsch Collection/Corbis Images
- Language: English
- Subject: Motion picture industry Nazi Germany
- Publisher: Belknap Press
- Publication date: September 9, 2013
- Publication place: United States
- Media type: Print (hardcover and paperback)
- Pages: 324
- ISBN: 978-0-674-72474-7 (hardcover)
- Dewey Decimal: 791.430973/0943
- LC Class: PN1993.5.G3 U79 2013

The Collaboration: Hollywood's Pact with Hitler is a 2013 non-fiction book by Ben Urwand. It was published on September 9, 2013, by Belknap Press, an imprint of Harvard University Press. It is about cooperation between 1930s U.S. filmmakers and Nazi Germany.

== Summary ==
According to the book the assistance was done for monetary reasons and because some film industry executives who were Jewish believed that antisemitism would increase if films were too obviously pleading for assistance for Jews. Urwand believes that the studio heads willingly assisted the Nazis. The author argued that the filmmakers feared that German authorities would prohibit American films and put anti-American content in German films if American film companies refused to co-operate, which means American filmmakers would have had no way to have a say in the German market. Edward Helmore of The Observer wrote that "Urwand's interpretation of the relationship is disputed by other scholars of the period." Ofer Ashkenazi of Hebrew University wrote in a review of the book that in addition to "shameless profit-seeking" the American film executives also considered "a logical, albeit not heroic, survival strategy" as this American industry also faced local anti-Semitic sentiment.

== Background ==
Archival materials were used as part of the book, including letters.

== Reception ==
Publishers Weekly designated the review with a star and wrote that "Urwand deserves immense credit for this groundbreaking—and truly unique—take on the WWII era." Kirkus Reviews described it as "a keen, unsettling look" at the subject, and that it "keeps the focus on a few films for an elucidating study." Melvin Jules Bukiet wrote in The Washington Post that the work shows "two-dimensional pictures of minorly venal minor men" who are "merely humans" and that "Urwand is too eager to find scandal."

David Denby wrote in The New Yorker that the book's conclusions were flawed, stating: "I'm surprised that Harvard University Press could have published anything as poorly argued as" the book. In response to his critics, Urwand stood by his book's conclusions, stating: "Any claims I make are based on archival materials. Everything in my book is documented."
