= Emil Byk =

Polish-Austrian lawyer (1845–1906)

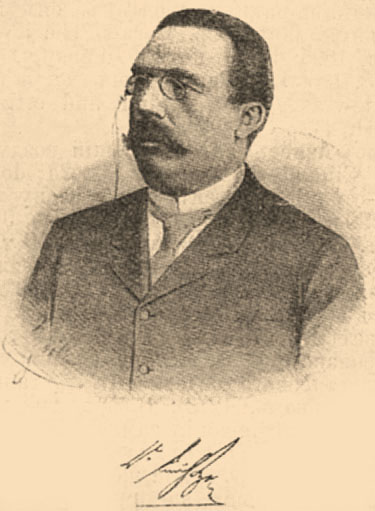
Emil Byk

Emil Byk (born 14 January 1845 at Janów (now Ukrainian: Dolyna), near Trembowla (Ukrainian: Теребовля), in Austrian Galicia (now Terebovlia, Ukraine) – 1906) was a Polish-Austrian-Jewish lawyer and deputy.

In 1885 he was chosen the chairman of the charity committee of the Cultusrath (German: Kultusrat, Board of Education) of Lemberg, and in 1902 became president of the Jewish community there. In 1890, he was a "Stadtverordneter" and president of the Shomer Israel Society. In 1891, he was elected to represent Brody and Zolochiv in the Reichsrat.

Some of his more important speeches in that body were:

an address in 1893 against Prince Liechtenstein on the establishment of a Jewish theological seminary.
an address on 4 May 1898 against the proposition that the sittings of the committee to consider the charges against ex-Prime Minister Kazimierz F. Graf Badeni should be public
1898 address on the "Ausnahmeszustand" (state of emergency) in Galicia, which was very well received.
