= Accumulatoren-Fabrik AFA =

German company

The Accumulatoren-Fabrik Aktiengesellschaft (AFA) was a manufacturer of lead-acid batteries established in 1890 by Adolph Müller of the Accumulatoren-Fabrik Tudorschen Systems Müller & Einbeck with the participation of the Siemens AG and AEG companies.

Initially based in Hagen, during World War II the company acquired a number of other factories, mostly confiscated by the Nazis from their previous owners. Among such factories were the modern Hannover plant (built in 1938), Mülhausen, Vienna and the factory in Poznań (1943) and Herbst (1944). During the 1940s forced labour was used in AFA factories. AFA's factory in the Viennese borough of Schwechat was one of the sub-camps of the Mauthausen-Gusen concentration camp. The factory was destroyed by an RAF Bomber Command air raid on 2 December 1944 . It provided batteries for, among others, the German U-boats and Panzer tanks.

== See also ==
- VARTA Batteries
