= Johanna Quandt =

German businesswoman (1926–2015)

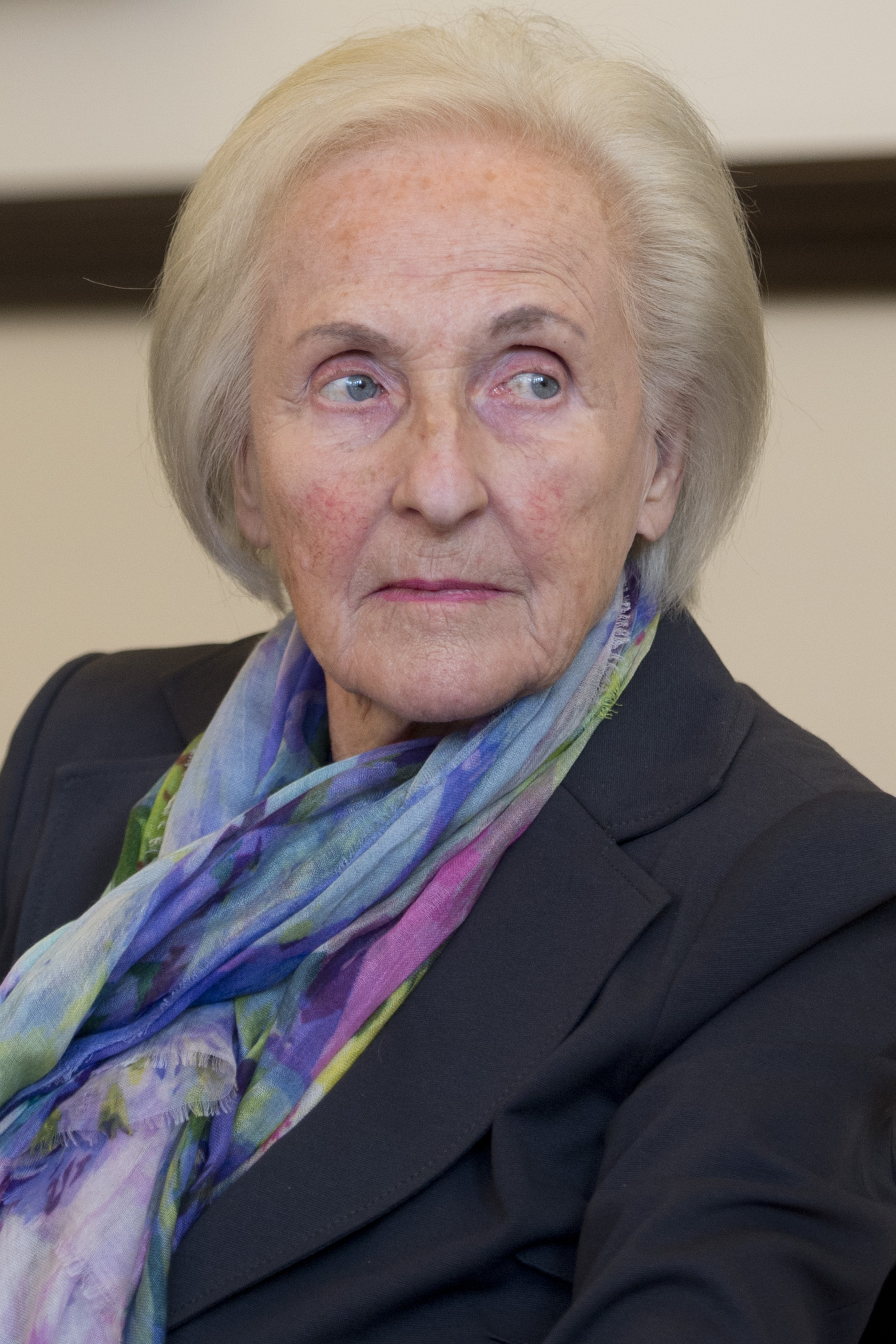
- Quandt in 2012
- Born: Johanna Maria Bruhn; 21 June 1926; Berlin, Germany
- Died: 3 August 2015 (aged 89); Bad Homburg, Germany
- Spouse: Herbert Quandt (m. 1960; died 1982)
- Children: Susanne; Stefan

Johanna Maria Quandt (née Bruhn; 21 June 1926 – 3 August 2015) was a German billionaire businesswoman and the widow of Herbert Quandt, an industrialist and prominent Nazi. When she died in 2015 she was the 8th richest person in Germany (and the richest German woman), the 77th richest person in the world, and the 11th richest woman worldwide according to Forbes.

== Career at BMW ==
Johanna Bruhn became a secretary in her future husband's office in the 1950s and eventually became his personal assistant. The two married in 1960. After his death in 1982, she was a major shareholder in BMW and sat on its supervisory board from 1982 until she retired in 1997. Much of that time she served as deputy chairwoman of the board. She owned 16.7% of BMW at the time of her death.

== The Silence of the Quandts ==
The documentary The Silence of the Quandts described the role of the Quandt family businesses during the Second World War. It disclosed information about the use of slave labourers in the family's factories during World War II. A later study funded by the Quandt family themselves concluded that "the Quandts were linked inseparably with the crimes of the Nazis". As of 2008 no compensation, apology or memorial at the site of one of their factories, have been permitted. BMW was not implicated in the report.

== Personal life ==
The two children of her marriage, Stefan and Susanne, are also substantial shareholders in BMW and now sit on the supervisory board of the company. Police prevented an attempt to kidnap her and her daughter Susanne Klatten in 1978. Johanna lived quietly in Bad Homburg.

A programme by the German public broadcaster, ARD, in October 2007 described in detail the role of the Quandt family businesses during the Second World War. As a result, four family members announced, on behalf of the entire Quandt family, their intention to fund a research project in which a historian will examine the family's activities during Hitler's dictatorship.

As of August 2014, the Quandt family is estimated to be worth $46.3 billion. Johanna Quandt died at the age of 89 in her home in Bad Homburg near Frankfurt am Main.

She created the foundation Johanna Quandt Stiftung, to provide training for aspiring business journalists. The foundation also provides prizes for outstanding business journalism. In 2009 she was awarded the Grand Cross of Merit.

== See also ==
- List of Germans by net worth
