= VARTA =

German electrical battery manufacturer

VARTA AG
- Logo used since 2021
- Type: Public
- Traded as: FWB: VAR1
- ISIN: DE000A0TGJ55
- Industry: Electrical equipment
- Predecessor: Accumulatoren-Fabrik AFA
- Founded: 27 December 1887; 138 years ago
- Founder: Adolf Müller
- Headquarters: Ellwangen, Germany
- Area served: Worldwide
- Key people: Michael Ostermann (CEO); Rainer Hald (CTO); Marc Hundsdorf (CFO)
- Products: Electrical batteries
- Revenue: 793,000,000 (2024)
- Net income: −64,500,000 (2024)
- Number of employees: 4,000 (2024)
- Website: www.varta-ag.com

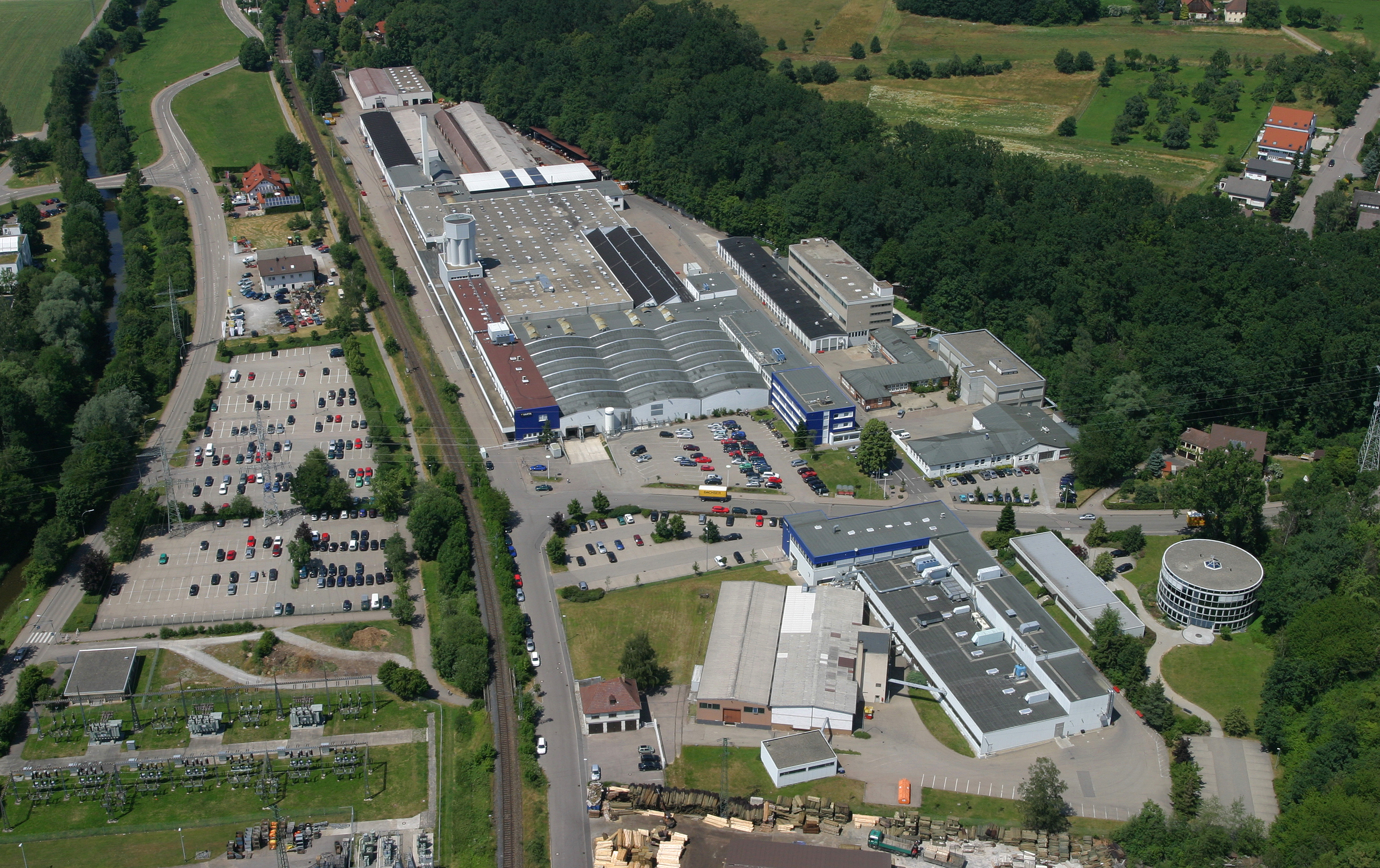
Aerial picture of the VARTA microbattery factory in Ellwangen

VARTA AG (pronounced [ˈvaʁta]; German: Vertrieb, Aufladung, Reparatur transportabler Akkumulatoren, lit. 'distribution, recharging and repair of portable accumulators') is a German company manufacturing batteries for global automotive, industrial, and consumer markets.

== History ==
VARTA was founded by Adolph Müller in 1887, and established in 1904 as a subsidiary of Accumulatoren-Fabrik AFA. After World War I, VARTA together with AFA was acquired by German industrialists Günther Quandt and Carl Hermann Roderbourg. After World War II, most of the VARTA shares passed from Günther Quandt to his son Herbert Quandt. The subsidiary in East Berlin was later occupied by the Soviet Union, and was named BAE Batterien.

In 1977, VARTA's businesses were split up by Herbert Quandt; battery and plastics operations were retained in VARTA, but the pharmaceuticals and specialty chemical businesses were transferred to a new company called Altana and the electrical business was spun off into a company called CEAG. Quandt left the company's shares to his children.

In 2002, the consumer battery activities (excluding button cells) were sold to Rayovac. By 2006, VARTA had sold all its operating divisions, and the Quandts had sold their shares. VARTA then liquidated its remaining assets, contracts, liabilities and shareholdings, in particular the manufacture and sale of VARTA batteries, while continuing its company businesses. The automotive battery business was acquired by Johnson Controls, and were sold on to Brookfield Business Partners in 2018. The button cell and home energy storage businesses were acquired by Montana Tech Components. In 2019, VARTA acquired its former consumer battery business back from Energizer.

On 19 October 2017, 11.6 million shares of VARTA were floated on the stock market (Prime Standard), with an additional 1.74 M bought by underwriters (green shoe), out of a total of 38.2 M shares. With an issue price of €17.50 the company had a value of €668.5 million. On 2 January 2019, American company Energizer took control over VARTA's consumer battery segment. On 29 May 2019, VARTA signed an agreement to acquire the VARTA consumer batteries business for the Europe, Middle East and Africa regions (including the manufacturing and distribution facilities in Germany) from Energizer, which was completed on 2 January 2020.

In 2020, the German- and the state of Baden-Württemberg government gave VARTA €300 million for the construction of a production facility for electric vehicle (EV) lithium-ion batteries, based on the "Important Projects of Common European Interest" (IPCEI) initiative, but the company decided to abandon the project two years later to cut cost. In 2023 they cut 800 jobs.

An attack on their IT systems in February 2024 forced production down for a month and prevented the scheduled annual general meeting in May 2024, with the news resulting in a temporary exchange loss of some 8.4%.

By June 2024 VARTA had accumulated debt of nearly €500 million and informed the Amtsgericht Stuttgart about a major restructuring. According to press reports from July 2024, the company intended to reduce its nominal capital to zero, which would devaluate its stock. Martin Buchenau commented in the Handelsblatt in late July 2024, that while minor shareholders are destined to lose everything, major shareholder Michael Tojner and Porsche are entangled in a bitter fight with creditors about who will give up how much of the money they lent to VARTA. Along those lines, in August 2024 a compromise was reached: the shareholders lose their stock, the banks write off €285 million of VARTA's debt, Porsche and Tojner make a new combined investment of €60 million and become the owners of VARTA. The deal was based on the 'Act on the Stabilization and Restructuring Framework for Companies' (Gesetz über den Stabilisierungs- und Restrukturierungsrahmen für Unternehmen, StaRUG) from 2021. Under the act, a majority of creditors have to agree to a restructuring plan, then approval of shareholders can be substituted by a court decision, preventing the shareholders from blocking their own sequestration.

In October 2024, Germany's Federal Cartel Office approved Porsche's acquisition of a non-controlling interest in VARTA as well as a majority of shares and sole control of V4Drive Battery, its business unit for large-format lithium-ion cells for electric cars.

In May 2026 Apple Inc. canceled a contract for AirPods batteries with VARTA. In July 2026 Michael Tojner announced that an additional restructuring became necessary after losing Apple as customer. A group of creditors, Deutsche Bank, RBC BlueBay, Blantyre Capital and Whitebox, pushed for a breakup of the company. On 24 July 2026 VARTA filed for bankruptcy.

== Products ==
Batteries and other products produced by VARTA
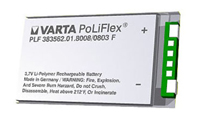
Poliflex-Accumulator from a VARTA microbattery

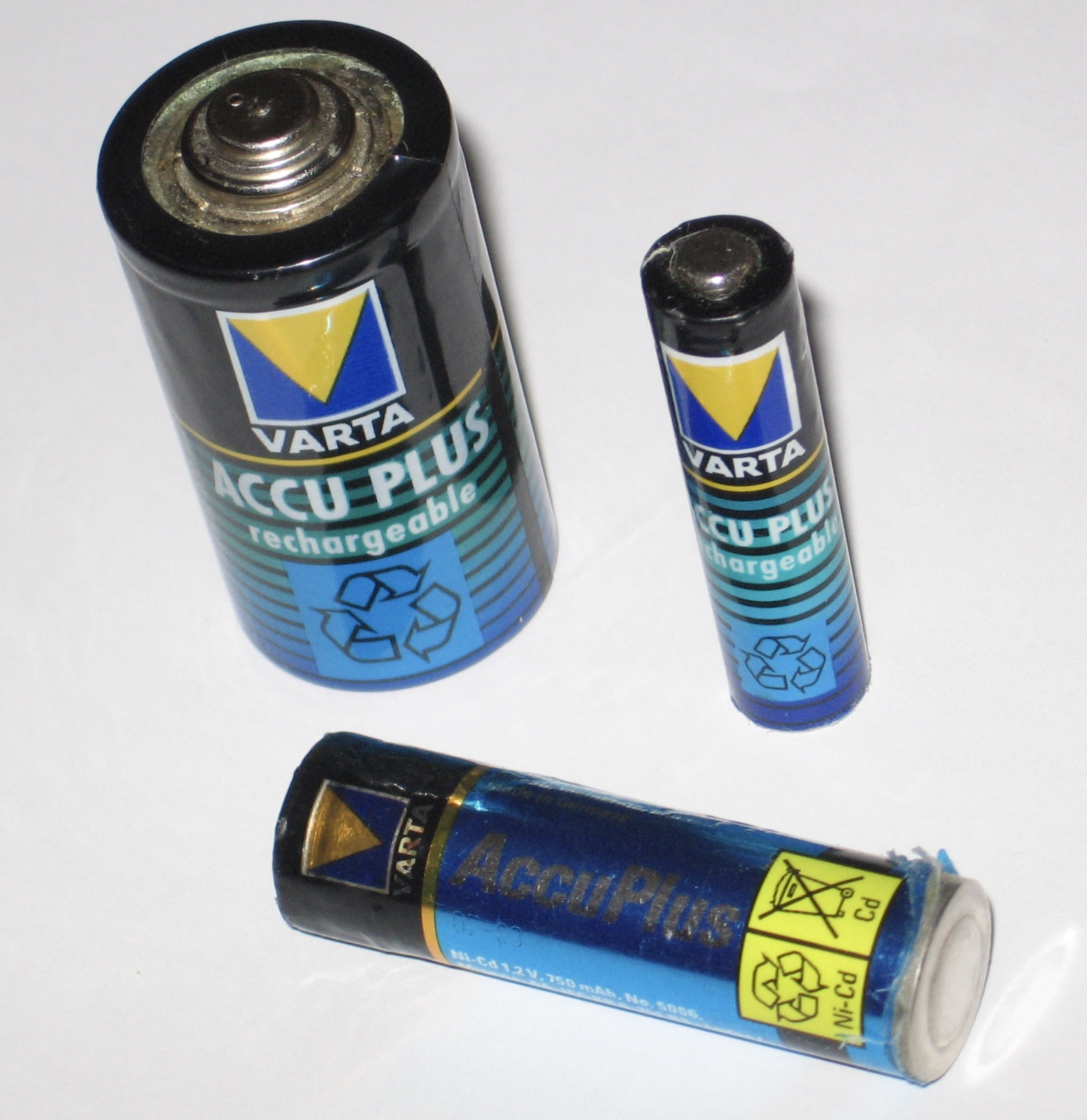
Rechargeable batteries

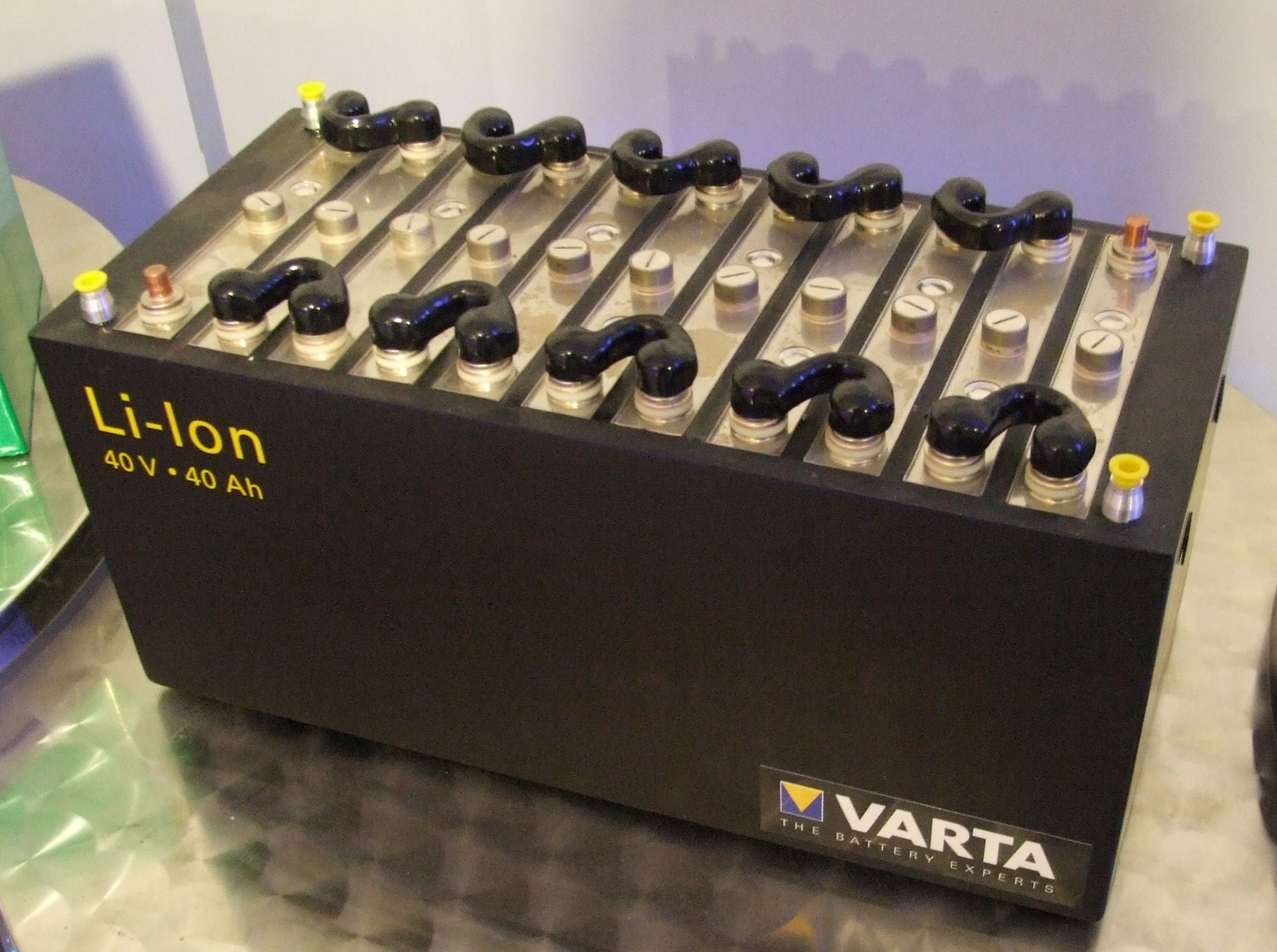
Lithium-ion-accumulator

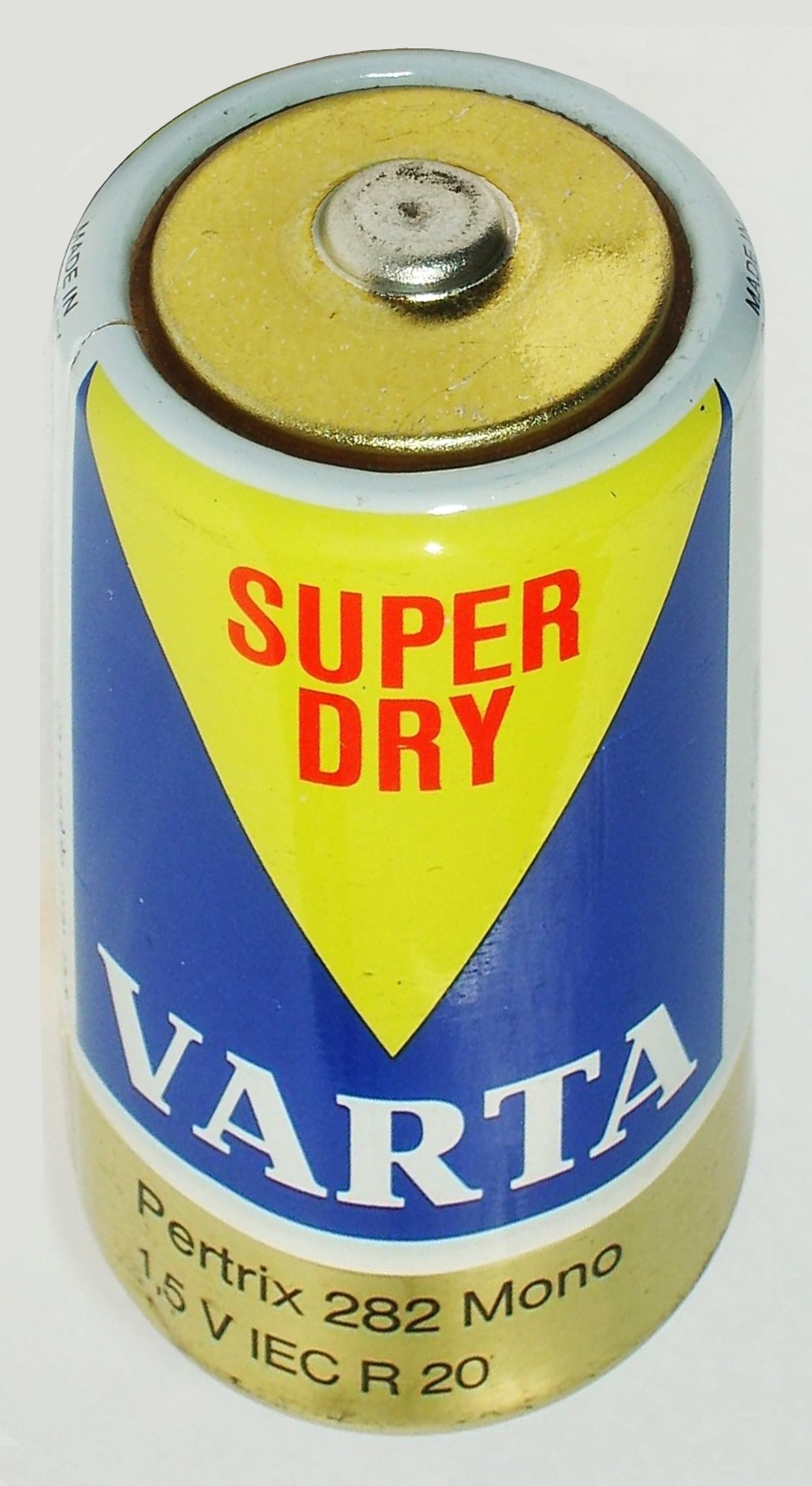
Zinc–carbon battery: monocel with the design of the 1970s

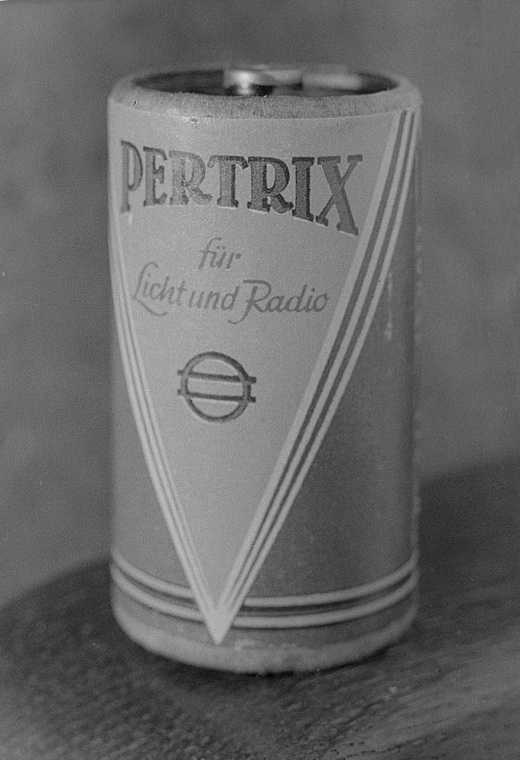
Pertrix battery

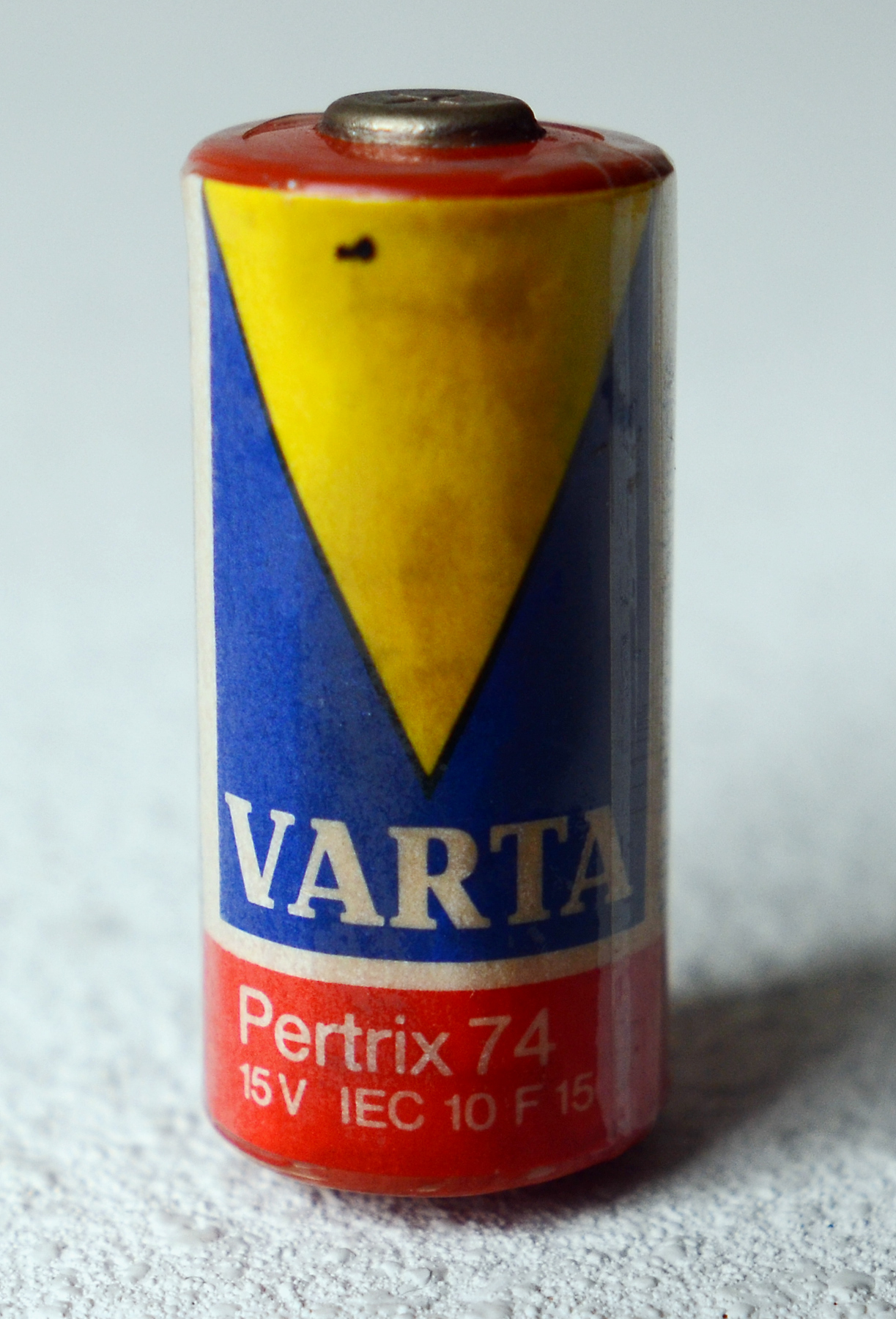
VARTA Pertrix 74, 15-volt battery

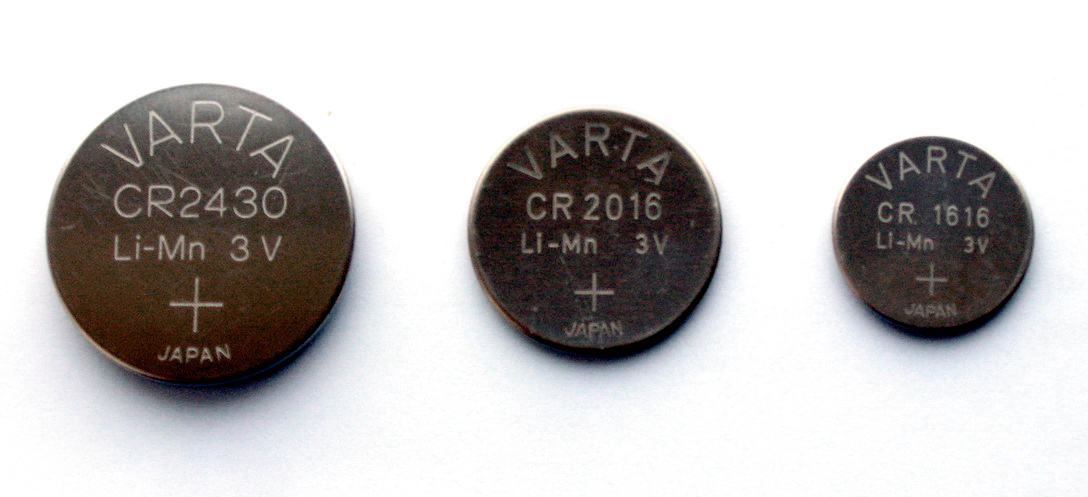
Coin cells

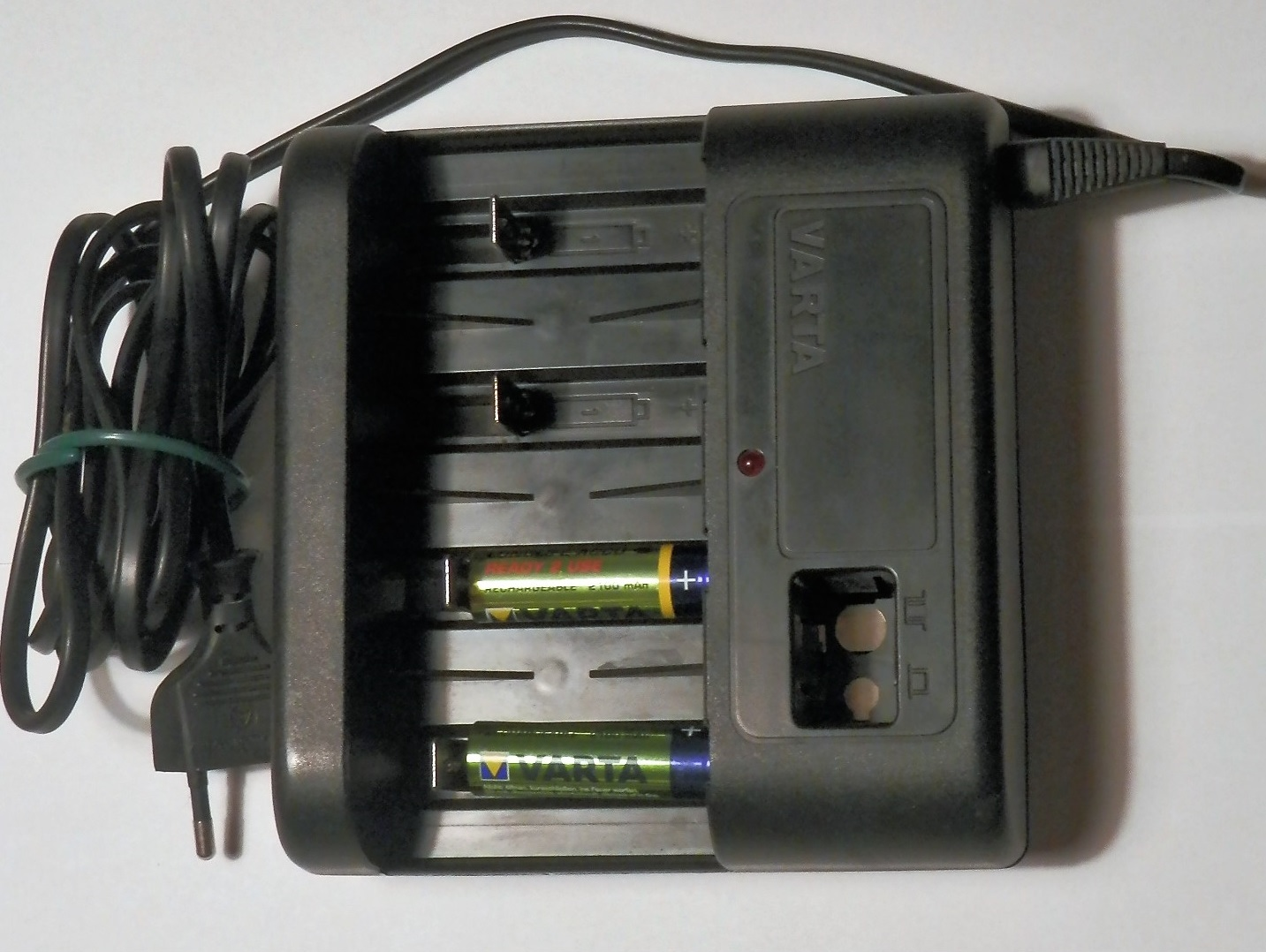
VARTA combi charger with two VARTA NiCd accumulators (2100 mAh, AA)

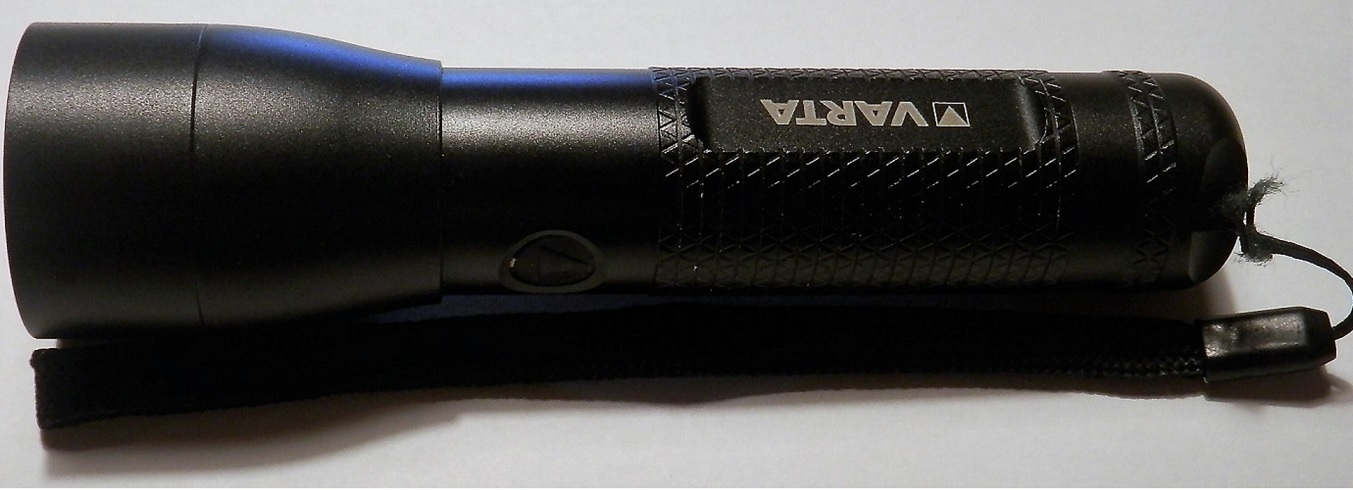
LED torch

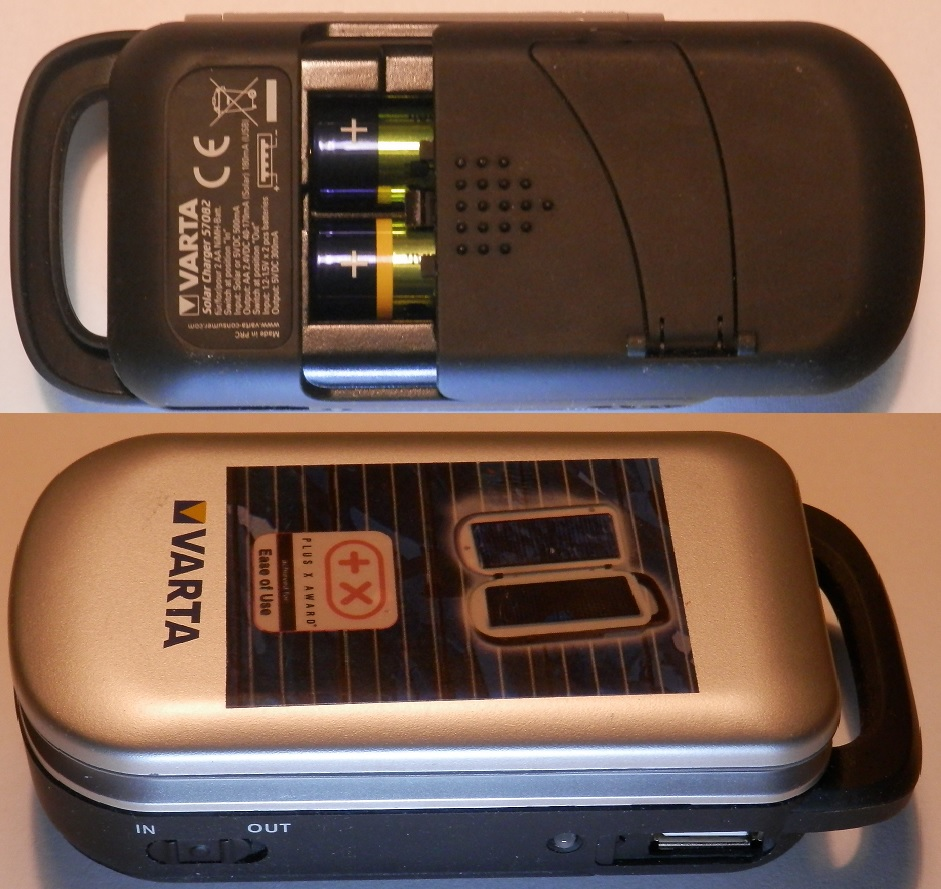
VARTA solar charger model 57082 with two 2100 mAh Ni–MH rechargeable batteries
