= Delton AG =

- Company type: Aktiengesellschaft
- Industry: Conglomerate
- Headquarters: Bad Homburg vor der Höhe, Germany
- Key people: Stefan Quandt, sole shareholder
- Website: delton.de

Delton AG is a strategic management holding company (located in Bad Homburg, Germany). Delton currently holds corporate investments in the sectors of pharmaceuticals and logistics.

The sole shareholder of Delton AG is Stefan Quandt. He is the fourth generation of Quandt family entrepreneurs.
