= The Silence of the Quandts =

- Das Schweigen der Quandts
- Directed by: Eric Friedler
- Release date: October 2007; (Initial release: September 30, 2007)
- Running time: 90 minutes
- Language: German

The Silence of the Quandts (German: Das Schweigen der Quandts) is a documentary about the Quandt family, originally aired in October 2007.

== See also ==
- Nazi Billionaires
