= BYK Additives & Instruments =

German supplier of additives and measuring instruments

- Company type: GmbH
- Industry: Chemicals
- Founded: 1873
- Headquarters: Wesel, Germany
- Key people: Dr. Jörg Hinnerwisch, Division President; Alison Avery, CFO & NAFTA
- Products: Chemicals
- Revenue: €1.289 billion (2025)
- Number of employees: around 2,600 employees
- Parent: Altana
- Website: byk.com

BYK is a globally operating supplier of additives and measuring instruments.

The areas of application of BYK additives include the coatings, inks, plastics and oil/gas industries, the manufacture of care products, the manufacture of adhesives and sealants, and construction chemistry. The instruments section (BYK-Gardner GmbH) develops measuring instruments for evaluating the color, appearance and physical properties of coatings, plastics and paper surfaces. BYK is one of four Divisions within the ALTANA Group.

BYK Additives & Instruments employs 2,688 people worldwide. In 2025 BYK, saw an 11 percent increase in both nominal and operating sales, reaching 1.289 billion euros.

== History ==
In 1873, Heinrich Byk founded a chemicals factory in Berlin under his name, in which he initially produced soporific drugs. In 1917, the firm merged with the dye and tanning works to form Byk-Guldenwerke AG; the photochemical factory Ernst Lomberg was acquired subsequently. The first BYK additive for coatings came on the market in 1935. It enabled pigments to be distributed evenly in coatings. In 1962, BYK established the site in Wesel, where it commenced production of paint and plastics additives.

BYK has production sites in Germany (Wesel, Kempen, Moosburg an der Isar, Schkopau and Geretsried), the Netherlands (Deventer, Nijverdal and Denekamp), the United Kingdom (Widnes), the United States (Wallingford, Chester, Gonzales, Louisville, Earth City and Pompano Beach) and China (Tongling).

== Research and development ==
BYK invests around 8% of turnover each year in research and development – this is more than double the amount customary in the sector.
