= Altana =

German chemical company

ALTANA AG
- Type: Aktiengesellschaft
- Industry: Chemicals
- Founded: 1977
- Founder: Herbert Quandt
- Headquarters: Wesel, Germany
- Key people: Martin Babilas, CEO; Tammo Boinowitz; Stefan Genten
- Revenue: € 3,081 billion (2025)
- Number of employees: around 8,176 (2025)
- Subsidiaries: ACTEGA; BYK; ECKART; ELANTAS; Savage Laboratories
- Website: www.altana.com

Altana AG (styled as ALTANA) is a German chemical company headquartered in Wesel. It was created in 1977, as a result of spinning off divisions from the Varta Group. The first CEO was Herbert Quandt.

The group comprises the divisions BYK (coating additives and instruments), Eckart (metal effect pigments and metallic printing inks), Elantas (insulation materials for the electrical and electronics industries) and Actega (coatings and sealant compounds for the packaging industry).

The Altana Group has 58 production facilities and 67 service and research laboratories worldwide. In 2025, the company, with around 8,176 employees, posted revenues of over €3 billion.

== History ==
Altana's roots go back to 1873, when Heinrich Byk founded the chemicals factory Dr. Heinrich Byk Chemische Fabrik in Oranienburg. The company grew, and in 1931, it was renamed BYK-Gulden Lomberg. In 1941, majority control of the company was acquired by AFA (Akkumulatoren-Fabrik AG) which was renamed VARTA in 1962. In 1977, VARTA was split into three companies, one of which was Altana.

From 1977 to 2010, Altana was publicly traded on the Frankfurt Stock Exchange. Altana was also admitted to trading on the New York Stock Exchange from 2002 to 2007.

On 19 December 2006, the majority of shareholders voted to approve the sale of the pharmaceuticals division to the Danish company Nycomed. Nycomed is owned by an investment consortium led by Nordic Capital and Credit Suisse. With the sale of the pharmaceuticals division, headquartered in Konstanz, Germany, Altana lost a major pillar of its business. At that time, 9,000 of the company's 13,500 employees were working for Altana in the pharmaceuticals sector, generating two-thirds of the company's total revenue. And indeed, the balance-sheet revenues fell by around 60 percent in 2006, but gained over six percent in 2007.

The patent for pantoprazole, a stomach ulcer and reflux treatment drug, the main revenue-generator for the former pharmaceuticals division, expired in 2009/2010. While the Altana Management Board justified the divestiture of the pharmaceutical business with delays in the approval of new products, increased research and development costs as well as strict regulatory requirements in the US and Europe, shareholder activists asserted that the management board had invested too little in the pharmaceutical business in the preceding years and had failed to develop successor products in time to compensate for the revenue losses to be expected due to the expiry of the pantoprazole patent at the end of the decade.

The pharmaceuticals division was sold for €4.6 billion. The entire proceeds from the sale were disbursed to the shareholders, who received a special dividend of €33 per share. Critics expressed discontent that the main shareholder benefited most from the sale of the pharmaceuticals division.

Until 1 January 2007, the company was organized into the pharmaceuticals division Altana Pharma AG, formerly Byk Gulden Lomberg Chemische Fabrik, headquartered in Konstanz, and the specialty chemicals division Altana Chemie AG based in Wesel. Since the sale of the pharmaceutical business to Nycomed, Altana has been operating exclusively in the specialty chemicals segment. This restructuring was accompanied by a change in the company logo, which was unified across all subsidiaries.

On 6 November 2008, main shareholder SKion GmbH (Germany, owned by Susanne Klatten) issued a public takeover offer of €13 per share for all outstanding shares, an action which drove up the stock price. A company spokesperson stated that the intention was to delist the company from public trading. To achieve this, SKion issued a second takeover offer of €14 per share to the remaining shareholders on 9 November 2009.

On 30 December 2008, the Frankfurt Stock Exchange announced that Altana would be removed from its MDAX index, as the increase in the share held by SKion had pushed the portion of stock held in free float to under ten percent. By June 2010, SKion held 95.04 percent of all shares.

In Germany, the stock was traded mainly on the Frankfurt and Stuttgart Exchanges and the Xetra platform; internationally, it was admitted to trading on the London Stock Exchange and the NASD Group, now FINRA, in the US.

After SKion acquired the entire Altana stock through a squeeze-out, trading in this stock was suspended effective 27 August 2010.
