= Seidel (surname) =

Surname list

Seidel is a surname of German origin.

== Geographical distribution ==
As of 2014, 75.2% of all known bearers of the surname Seidel were residents of Germany (frequency 1:1,150), 13.2% of the United States (1:29,401), 3.8% of Brazil (1:58,599) and 1.2% of Poland (1:34,522).

In Germany, the frequency of the surname was higher than national average (1:1,150) in the following states:

1. Saxony (1:258)
2. Thuringia (1:559)
3. Bremen (1:668)
4. Saxony-Anhalt (1:671)
5. Brandenburg (1:705)
6. Mecklenburg-Vorpommern (1:1,058)

== List of people surnamed Seidel ==
- Alex Seidel (1909–1989), German firearm manufacturer and businessman
- Andreas Seidel-Morgenstern (born 1956), German process engineer
- Anna Seidel (1938–1991), German sinologist
- Anna Seidel (speed skater) (born 1998), German short track skater
- Bastian Seidel (born 1975), Australian politician and medical doctor
- Brian Seidel (1928–2019), Australian painter and teacher
- Christian Seidel (born 1959), German author and film producer
- Christiane Seidel (born 1988), American-born German-Danish actress
- Ed Seidel (born 1957), American computer scientist and physicist
- Edmund Seidel (1878–?), American politician from New York
- Ella Seidel (born 2005), German tennis player
- Emil Seidel (1864–1947), American politician from Wisconsin
- Erich Seidel (canoeist), West German slalom canoeist
- Erich Seidel (ophthalmologist), German ophthalmologist
- Erik Seidel, American poker player
- Franz Schweigger-Seidel (1834–1871), German physiologist
- Frederick Seidel (born 1936), American poet
- Fynn Seidel (born 2004), German footballer
- Guenter Seidel (born 1960), American equestrian
- Hanns Seidel (1901–1961), German politician
- Heinrich Seidel (1842–1906), German engineer and writer
- Heinz Seidel (born 1931), German cross-country skier
- Hillel Seidel (1920–1999), Israeli politician
- Ina Seidel (1885–1974), German poet and author
- Jan Seidel (born 1984), German football referee
- Janet Seidel (1955–2017), Australian jazz singer
- Jed Seidel, American television producer and screenwriter
- Jen Seidel (born 1968), American professional body painter
- Kathleen Seidel, American autism blogger
- Katrin Seidel (born 1967), German politician
- Lavon Seidel-Volsky (born 1965), Belarusian musician
- Leon Seidel (born 1996), German actor
- Lindsay Seidel, American voice actress
- Mike Seidel (born 1957), American meteorologist
- Molly Seidel (born 1994), American long-distance runner
- Paul Seidel (born 1970), Swiss-Italian mathematician
- Paul Seidel (cyclist) (1913–1940), German racing cyclist
- Philipp Ludwig von Seidel (1821–1896), German mathematician, optician and astronomer
- Raimund Seidel, German and Austrian computer scientist
- Silvia Seidel (1969–2012), German actress
- Slava Seidel (born 1974), German artist
- Sören Seidel (born 1972), German football manager
- Sven Seidel (born 1973/74), German business executive
- Toscha Seidel (1899–1962), Russian musician
- Wolfgang Seidel (1926–1987), German racing driver

== See also ==
- Seidl, a surname
- Seydel, a surname
- Seidell, a surname
- Siedel, a surname
- Zajdel (disambiguation), Polonized version
