= Law and management =

The Law and Management Approach (French: L’approche Law and Management) is a term defined by Antoine Masson and Hugh Bouthinon-Dumas, researchers at ESSEC Business School, to refer to any research works focusing on Law as a key factor for companies' success.

The research approach, unlike the Economic Analysis of Law (also known as "Law and Economics") which primarily aims at assessing and comparing the cost and efficiency of the rules in accordance with criteria developed by economists, seeks to explain the differences of performance between companies facing the same legal environment, according to their ability to take advantage of legal strategies.

From a methods perspective, the Law and Management approach focuses on the behaviours of economic actors towards Law. The Law and Management methods are therefore primarily behavioral and borrow numerous investigation and data processing techniques from the fields of sociology and psychology, since these approaches rely on observation. The purpose of the approach is nevertheless specific and consistent with management sciences, as it try to understand how Law can be used by (and within) companies to achieve their assigned goals (that are mainly economic). The results of Law and Management studies can be used to base recommendations that are addressed primarily not to normative or judicial authorities (as in the Law & Economic) but to the economic actors.

== Recent work in the field ==
Currently, the Law and Management approach refers to the legal work of authors such as:

- in the United States, Constance Bagley (Yale School of Management), Robert Bird (University of Connecticut), and George Siedel (Michigan Business School),
- in Scandinavia (around the "proactive law" movement), Haapio Helena (University of Vaasa), and
- in France, Christophe Roquilly (EDHEC), Christophe Collard (EDHEC), Antoine Masson (ESSEC) and Hugues Bouthinon-Dumas (ESSEC).
