= Christian Härtnagel =

German businessman (born 1982)

Christian Härtnagel (born 20 July 1982) is a German businessman, and the former UK managing director of Lidl.

== Early life ==
He was born in Bavaria (Bayern). He attended the Christoph-Jacob-Treu-Gymnasium from 1993 to 2002 (CJT) in Lauf an der Pegnitz, near Erlangen-Höchstadt.

He attended the Baden-Wuerttemberg Cooperative State University Loerrach in Lörrach, where he studied economics.

== Career ==
=== Lidl ===
He started at Lidl Germany in 2003, at a Nuremberg store. After 2009, he worked at Lidl Ireland, He moved to Lidl Austria GmbH (Lidl Österreich). Lidl opened in Austria in 1998, and now has around 200 outlets.

He became managing director of Lidl UK on 9 September 2017. He left in January 2022. A new £70m UK headquarters opened in Tolworth in 2021 for 800 employees.

From 1 March 2022, he has been head of Lidl Germany AG, replacing Matthias Oppitz (Lidl-Deutschlandchef), with headquarters in Bad Wimpfen in Baden-Württemberg, with 1,200 people. Lidl Germany has 3,250 stores, with 24.3 bn euros turnover. In 2023 the company celebrated 50 years with Helene Fischer, Barbara Schöneberger and Max Giermann.

== Personal life ==
Härtnagel is married and has a son and a daughter. He lives in Raynes Park.

== See also ==
- Jesper Højer, (Danish) chief executive of Lidl since February 2017

Business positions
Preceded by Ronny Gottschlich	Managing Director of Lidl UK; September 2016 - January 2022	Succeeded by Ryan McDonnell
