= Vicari (surname) =

Vicari is a surname. Notable people with the surname include:

- Andrew Vicari (1938–2016), Welsh painter
- Frank Vicari (1931–2006), American jazz saxophonist
- Franziska Seidl (née Vicari, 1892–1983), Austrian physicist
- Hermann von Vicari (1773–1868), German archbishop
- Lisa Vicari (born 1997), German actress
- Salvatore Vicari (born 1981), Italian footballer
