= Seydel =

Seydel is a German surname. Notable people with the surname include:

- C.A. Seydel (died 1882), founder of harmonica manufacturing firm C. A. Seydel Söhne
- Marianne Seydel (born 1950), East German swimmer
- Rudolf Seydel (1835–1892), German philosopher and theologian

== See also ==
- Seidel (disambiguation)
- Seidl
