= Siedel =

Siedel is a surname. Notable people with the surname include:

- Erhard Siedel (1895–1979), German actor
- George Siedel, American author and professor

== See also ==
- Seidel (surname)
