= Ronny Gottschlich =

German businessman

Ronny Gottschlich (born 14 May 1975) is a German businessman, and the former managing director of Lidl U.K. GmbH with around 630 stores, and around 5.5m customers.

== Early life ==
Ronny Gottschlich attended the Martin Luther University of Halle-Wittenberg, in Halle (Saale) in Saxony-Anhalt (former GDR or East Germany). He also went to the Merseburg University of Applied Sciences (FH Merseburg) in Merseburg, also in Saxony-Anhalt.

== Career ==
Gottschlich joined Lidl in 2000, working at a store in Unna in North Rhine-Westphalia until 2002. He joined Lidl UK in 2002 as the National Audit Manager. It was within his remit to ensure that all stores in the UK complied with the Lidl concept. In January 2004 he became responsible for around 60 stores in London and the south of England. In 2009 he became operations director for Lidl Austria.

In September 2010 he became managing director of Lidl UK, with around 600 stores, eight regional distribution centres, and around 11,000 employees.

In September 2016, Gottschlich left Lidl UK.

== Personal life ==
Gottschlich is in a relationship, has two children and lives in Halle/Saale.

Business positions
Preceded by Frank-Michael Mros	Managing Director of Lidl UK; September 2010 – September 2016	Succeeded by Christian Härtnagel
