= Seidell =

Seidell is a surname. Notable people with the surname include:

- Atherton Seidell (1878–1961), American chemist
- Streeter Seidell (born 1982), American comedian, writer, actor, and television host

== See also ==
- Seidel (surname)
