= Seidl =

Seidl is a surname. Notable people with the surname include:

- Alfred Seidl (1911–1993), German lawyer and politician
- Andreas Seidl (born 1976), German motorsport engineer and manager
- Anton Seidl (1850–1898), Hungarian conductor
- Florian Seidl (born 1979), Austrian vehicle designer
- Franziska Seidl (1892–1983), Austrian physicist
- Gabriel von Seidl (1848–1913), German architect
- Johann Gabriel Seidl (1804–1875), Austrian archaeologist, lyricist, narrator and dramatist
- Josef Seidl (born 1992), Czech sportsman, teacher, military officer
- Mario Seidl (born 1992), Austrian Nordic combined skier
- Matthias Seidl (born 2001), Austrian footballer
- Otto Seidl (1931–2022), German judge
- Siegfried Seidl (1911–1947), Commander of Theresienstadt concentration camp
- Simon Seidl (born 2002), Austrian footballer
- Ulrich Seidl (born 1952), Austrian director, screenwriter and producer
- Wenzel Benno Seidl (1773–1842), Austrian botanist and naturalist

== See also ==
- Seidel (disambiguation)
