= George Siedel =

- Education: College of Wooster, University of Michigan, University of Cambridge
- Occupations: Professor, author
- Employer: University of Michigan
- Known for: Proactive Law; Three Pillar Model

George J. Siedel is an American author and professor on the faculty at the Ross School of Business, University of Michigan, where he is the Williamson Family Professor of Business Administration and the Thurnau Professor of Business Law. He is known for his research on proactive law, negotiation, and alternative dispute resolution, and for his work in the development of MOOCs (Massive Open Online Courses).

== Career ==
In 1974 Siedel joined the faculty of the Ross School of Business at the University of Michigan, where he has served as Associate Dean. He was a visiting professor at Stanford University and Harvard University, a visiting scholar at Berkeley, a Parsons Fellow at the University of Sydney, and a visiting fellow at Cambridge University's Wolfson College. He is a Life Fellow of the Michigan State Bar Foundation. In addition to his courses at the University of Michigan, he has taught negotiation worldwide, including in Hong Kong, Thailand, South Korea, India, Bulgaria, Slovenia, and Brazil, and he currently teaches annually in Croatia and Italy.

In 2014, he developed a MOOC (Massive Open Online Course) on "Successful Negotiation: Essential Strategies and Skills". This course was followed in 2016 with a MOOC on "The Three Pillar Model for Business Decisions: Strategy, Law & Ethics".

Siedel's approach to negotiation strategy combines theory with practical advice. This approach is summarized in his book on Negotiating for Success: Essential Strategies and Skills and in media interviews. He has coauthored two books and other publications on proactive law with Helena Haapio, the founder and leader of the Proactive Law Movement in Europe. He also created the three pillar model for business decisions, which enables business to create value through a framework that combines strategy, law and ethics.
