= Louis M. Brown =

American lawyer

- Born: September 5, 1909; Los Angeles, California, U.S.
- Died: September 19, 1996 (aged 87)
- Education: University of Southern California (BA, 1930); Harvard Law School (LLB, 1933)
- Occupation: Attorney
- Employer: University of Southern California
- Known for: Pioneer of preventive law
- Notable work: Preventive Law (1950); Lawyering Through Life: The Origin of Preventive Law (1984)

Louis M. Brown (September 5, 1909 – September 19, 1996) was an American attorney and pioneer of the field of preventive law, which focuses on avoiding litigation.

Brown was the author of the 1950 textbook Preventive Law and the 1984 book Lawyering Through Life: The Origin of Preventive Law. His philosophy of law is summarized by his statement, "The time to see an attorney is when you're legally healthy – certainly before the advent of litigation, and prior to the time legal trouble occurs."

Born in Los Angeles, Brown graduated in 1930 from the University of Southern California and in 1933 from the law school of Harvard University. He was an adjunct professor at the University of Southern California from 1960 to 1974, full professor from 1974 to 1980, and professor emeritus from 1980 to his death.

Brown established a Client Counselling Competition for law students which was adopted by The American Bar Association in 1972. This developed into an American national competition and in 1985, an international competition (now the Brown Mosten International Client Consultation Competition). In 2018, 22 countries took part.
