= Seidel =

Seidel may refer to:

- Seidel (surname)
- Seidel, German for beer stein
- Seidel (crater), on the Moon
- Seidel Band Instrument Company, a short-lived American company
- Seidel Creek, a stream in Pennsylvania
