= Jen Seidel =

American artist and body painter

Jen Seidel (born 24 December 1968), also known as Jen the Body Painter, is a professional body painter from Reistertown, Maryland.

== Artwork ==
Seidel's body painting art has received extensive national and international coverage, including from sources such as Yahoo Lifestyle, Asbury Park Press, and others. The British newspaper The Daily Mirror observed that Seidel "has made a name for herself on YouTube and Instagram with her incredibly lifelike outfits made entirely from paint." She has often used the process of painting clothes on nude or semi nude people, who then go unnoticed as people around them seldom realized that the "clothing" is actually painted on the skin.

In 2014 Seidel published a coffee table book of her work through 80 West Media entitled Covered, A Body of Work by Jen Seidel.

In 2019 Seidel received wide coverage when she recreated a Bob Ross landscape painting on her own stomach.
