= Slava Seidel =

German painter (born 1974)

- Education: State Academy of Fine Arts
- Known for: painting

Slava Seidel (born 1974) is a German painter.

== Early life ==
Seidel was born in Kryvyi Rih, Ukraine (formerly Soviet Ukraine).

== Education ==
In 1999, she moved to Germany. In 2002, Seidel studied at the State Academy of Fine Arts (Städelschule) in Frankfurt am Main, and was a master student in professional free painting, where she studied with Christa Näher. In 2008, Seidel graduated.

== Awards ==
- 2018: Winner of Phönix Art Award, Art Prize for Up-and-coming Artists
- 2013: Fellowship Künstlerhaus Hooksiel
- 2012: Fellowship Atelierhaus Salzamt
- 2011: Fellowship Werkstatt Plettenberg

== Selected exhibitions ==
- 2018 „Phönix Kunstpreis“ Evangelische Akademie Tutzing
- 2017 Berlin Art Week Works from the collection SØR Rusche
- 2015 „Franz Josef Strauß“ Munich Stadtmuseum
- 2014 „Slava Seidel“ Städtische Galerie house “Eichenmüller”, Lemgo
- 2013 Collection Rusche, Museum Abbey Liesborn
- 2013 Kallmann-Museum, Ismaning, Munich
- 2010 „Détournement Venise“ Palazzo Albrizzi Cannaregio, Venice Biennale
- 2008: Städel Museum, Frankfurt am Main
- 2008 Nassauischer Kunstverein Wiesbaden
- 2005 „Wide Bridge“, Joensuu Art Museum and Kajaani Art Museum Finland

== Bibliography ==
- Slava Seidel. sepia, (Verlag für moderne Kunst 2008) ISBN 978-3940748867
- Kunstwelten (boesner holding + innovations, 2012) ISBN 978-3928003018

== Collections ==
Collections of art that own examples of Seidel's work include:

- Munich Stadtmuseum Munich Stadtmuseum
- "SØR Rusche Collection. Shown artworks are by David Lynch, Miriam Vlaming, Benjamin Bergmann, Andreas Blank, Andreas Golder, Slava Seidel, Oda Jaune"
