= Jesper Højer =

Danish businessman (born 1978)

- Born: 5 September 1978 (age 47)
- Education: Aarhus University
- Occupations: CEO, Jumbo
- Predecessor: Sven Seidel

Jesper Højer (born 5 September 1978) is a Danish businessman. He was the CEO of the Lidl supermarket discount chain, from 2017 to 2019. His main reason for departure of the role, is to spend more time with his family. He succeeded Sven Seidel.

== Career ==
Prior to his appointment as CEO of Lidl, Højer had been head of the business in Belgium, head of its international buying operation, purchasing director of Lidl Netherlands and head of purchasing of fish products in Germany, totaling ten years of working for Lidl.

After some years on various company boards, starting from 2026, Højer will be CEO of Dutch supermarket chain Jumbo.

== Early life ==
Jesper Højer grew up in Snoghøj, Denmark. His father, Preben Højer, owned and operated a clothing store, which was founded by his grandfather, in the nearby town of Fredericia. He studied business at International Business College in Middelfart and at Aarhus Business School.

== Personal life ==
Højer is married and has a son and a daughter.

He is fluent in German and proficient in Dutch and French.

== See also ==
- Kasper Rørsted
- Jim Hagemann Snabe
