= Proactive law =

1990s movement in legal theory

Proactive law is an approach to legal issues that emphasizes the use of law as a tool for promoting success and fostering sustainable relationships in business and society, rather than viewing it solely as a set of constraints requiring compliance. It aims to increase value for companies, individuals, and communities by anticipating and addressing potential legal challenges before they arise.

The term proactive is the opposite of reactive, reflecting an ex ante view(before the event), rather than an ex post view(after the event)perspective on legal matters. According to the Merriam-Webster dictionary, the word "proactive" refers to acting in anticipation of future problems, needs, or changes. Thus, the proactive law approach challenges the traditional backwards and failure-oriented approach to law by acting in anticipation of legal disputes, taking control of potential problems, providing solutions, and self-initiating actions, instead of reacting to failures and shortcomings.

The focus of the proactive law movement is the Nordic countries and Finland in particular. The movement took off in the late 1990s and is almost similar to the American movement – Law as a Competitive Source. Both of these parallel evolutions are founded on the work of Louis M. Brown, developed in the 1950s and known as the "preventive approach to law".

== From Preventive Law to Proactive Law ==
The proactive law movement has become more visible in recent years, but the idea of an ex ante view is not new. It is generally agreed that the earlier a dispute or a potential dispute is addressed, the better the chances of a fair, just and prompt solution. Louis M. Brown was the first to introduce the ex ante view in his ground-laying book "Preventive Law" (1950). Although he identified and organized the preventive law into a distinctive way of thinking, he was not the inventor of this approach. It has been, and still is, well known to many legal professionals and every business manager that:

It usually costs less to avoid getting into trouble than to pay for getting out of trouble.

To understand the general principles of proactive law requires understanding the core principles of preventive law, as these principles create the foundation for proactive law and proactive contracting. Edward Dauer identifies four core principles of preventive law:

- Predicting human behavior to anticipate and account for what people will do, and by doing so, prevents litigation. This improves personal and business relationships, and constitutes an essential part of the preventive law.
- Conflict management—preventive law draws parallels from the medical world, e.g., successful medical treatment is prophylactic.
- Embracement of risks: Instead of focusing solely on reducing one or a few risks to zero, the preventive law approach strives to reduce the overall sum of risk.
- Preventive legal service: Lawyers and in-house counsels must participate with others in multi-disciplinary teams in the planning of business ventures. Bringing legal expertise in earlier helps detect and prevent legal problems.

The proactive law movement encompasses the basic principles of preventive law stated above, namely preventing what is not desirable, and keeping problems and risks from materializing. Thus, as proactive law consists of preventive law, the characteristics above constitute the foundation of proactive law.

=== The promotive dimension ===
To this preventive dimension of law, proactive law adds a second aspect, which is often neglected in traditional law – known as the promotive dimension.

The nature of the promotive dimension is positive and constructive and promotes what is desirable while encouraging good behavior. This is where we find the distinction to preventive law. In a legal context, proactive law emphasizes the importance of collaboration between legal professionals and other disciplines to achieve the desired goals in circumstances where legal expertise collaborates with other disciplines. Proactive law therefore emphasizes the need for dialogue between different understandings. In a medical context, the preventive law prevents ill health, while proactive law promotes well-being.

The proactive law approach is based on legal certainty, literacy, and cross-professional collaboration to "localize the mines and preventing them from exploding".

In addition to navigating past the mines, the legal professionals should create economic value, and thus must be outcome-orientated to exploit the promotive dimension. Lawyers and in-house counsel thus must act to achieve results by watching for changes or opportunities and setting improved goals. To do so, legal professionals must highlight opportunities to build a solid business foundation, roadmaps for performance, trust, and better sustainable relationships.

Besides achieving these business goals, it is important to focus on legal risk management to prevent disputes. Many legal disputes arise due to misunderstandings and disappointed expectations. However, careful attention to legal clarity along with early warning mechanisms, and enhanced collaboration between business partners, through establishment of common goals, avoids the business from getting to the stage of dispute.

It is essential in proactive law that legal professionals, managers, and other involved stakeholders collaborate on a cross-professional basis to avoid disputes. In addition to avoiding disputes, it is also important to promote creative thinking. To develop new ideas, and concepts that correspond to the needs, problems or challenges, it is necessary to look towards the future rather than the past, maybe by using already known approaches, but also non-existing approaches. This invites businesses, authorities and researchers to develop solutions through creative thinking.

Thus, proactive law is about problem-solving, detecting real-life causes for potential misunderstandings and failures, but most of all it is about fostering and promoting fruitful and sustainable relationships that enables the stakeholders to reach their goals, creating value for business, individuals, and society as a whole.

== Proactive law in legislation ==
An indication that proactive law is gaining prominence is the fact that in 2009 the European Economic and Social Committee (EESC) has published an opinion on "the proactive law approach". The EESC urges a paradigm shift, as the time has come to give up the centuries-old reactive approach to law and to adopt a pro active approach. It is time to look at law in a different way: to look forward rather than back, to focus on how the law is used and operates in everyday life and how it is received in the community it seeks to regulate. While responding to and resolving problems remain important, preventing causes of problems is vital, along with serving the needs and facilitating the productive interaction of citizens and businesses.

By its very nature, the Community legal system is precisely the type of area in which the proactive approach should be adopted when planning, drawing up and implementing laws; against this backdrop, the EESC would argue that rules and regulations are not the only way nor always the best way to achieve the desired objectives; at times, the regulator may best support valuable goals by refraining from regulating and, where appropriate, encouraging self-regulation and co-regulation. This being the case, the fundamental principles of subsidiarity, proportionality, precaution and sustainability take on new importance and a new dimension.

The EESC believes that the single market can benefit greatly when EU law and its makers — legislators and administrators in the broadest sense — shift their focus from inward, from inside the legal system, rules and institutions, to outward, to the users of the law: to society, citizens and businesses that the legal system is intended to serve.

While the transposition and implementation of laws are important steps towards better regulation at EU level, regulatory success should be measured by how the goals are achieved at the level of the users of the law, EU citizens and businesses. The laws should be communicated in ways that are meaningful to their intended audience, first and foremost to those whose behaviour is affected and not just to the relevant institutions and administrators.

The EESC argues that the application of the proactive law approach should be considered systematically in all lawmaking and implementation within the EU, strongly believing that by making this approach not only part of the Better Regulation agenda, and but also a priority for legislators and administrators at the EU, national and regional levels, it would be possible to build a strong legal foundation for individuals and businesses to prosper.

== Proactive law in a business context ==
When proactive law is adapted to business, the approach is called "Proactive Contracting" and "Proactive Contract Management". The legal area of research developed in Scandinavia in the 1990s and has gradually gained attention. Proactive contracting deals with contract management, risk management and business process management. Empirical studies on contracting capabilities and research on dynamic capabilities have shown that promoting proactive behavior in businesses can be advantageous.

One aspect of proactive contracting is the design of alternative dispute resolution (ADR) mechanisms to prevent escalation of disputes into litigation. An ADR strategy limits the time and money spent by management on litigation. Thus, the costly disruption of litigation and the opportunity cost are limited. In addition to preventing escalation of the dispute, proactive contracts allow the contracting parties to anticipate the next step of the resolution process, as the procedure has been contractually agreed.
