= Sven Seidel =

German businessman

- Born: 1973 or 1974 (age 52–53)
- Occupations: CEO, Lidl
- Term: 2014–2017
- Predecessor: Karl-Heinz Holland
- Successor: Jesper Højer

Sven Seidel (born 1973/74) is a German businessman, CEO of the Lidl supermarket chain, from March 2014 to February 2017, when he was succeeded by Jesper Højer.

Prior to his appointment as CEO, Seidel had been head of corporate development for over three years. He was previously a partner at Porsche Consulting.
