= Zajdel =

Zajdel is a surname of Polish origin. Notable people with this surname include:

- Janusz Zajdel (1938–1985), Polish science fiction author
- Saulie Zajdel, Canadian politician
- Stan Zajdel (1927–2017), American football player and coach

== See also ==
- Janusz A. Zajdel Award, often called just Zajdel, the annual award for Polish science fiction and fantasy named after the author of the same name
