= Lidl =

Trademark used by two Germany-based discount chains

- Logo used since 1973

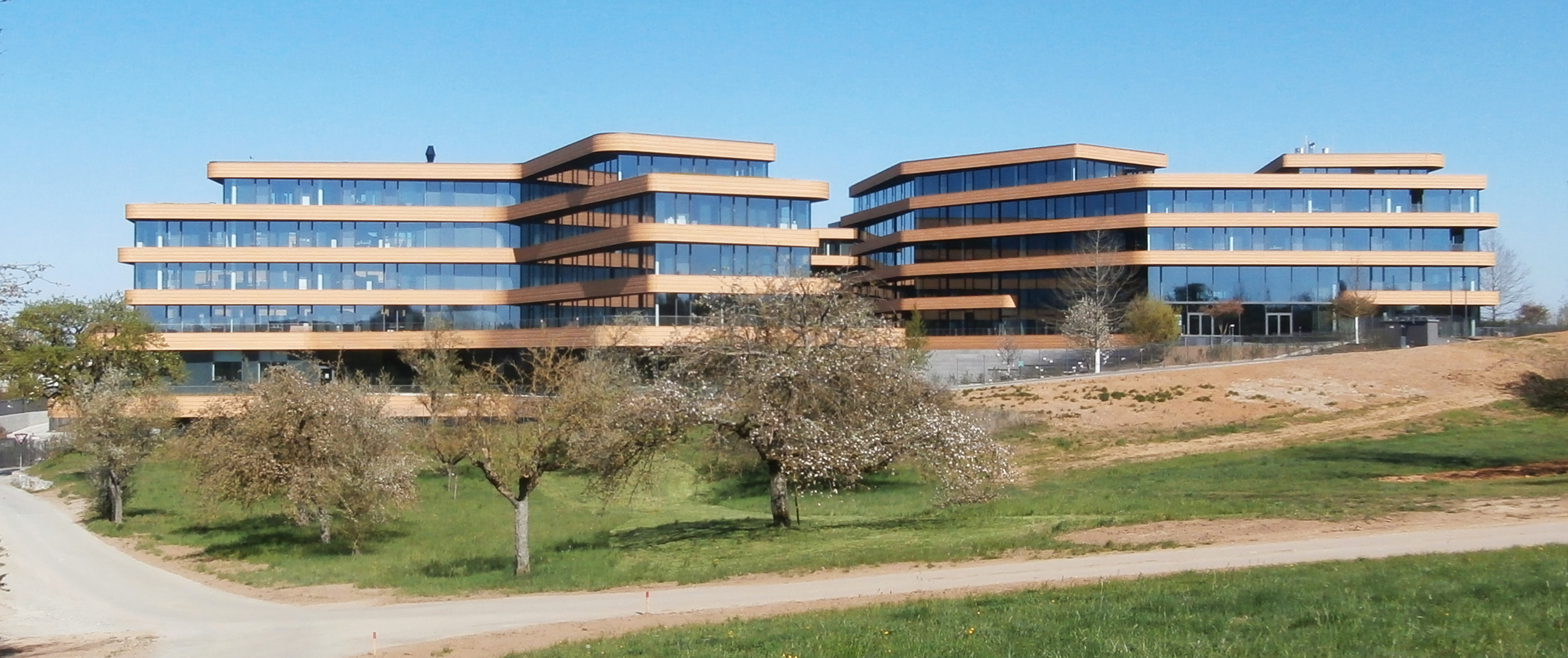
- LD Stiftung's Headquarters in Bad Wimpfen
- Type: Private
- Industry: Retail
- Founded: 1930; 96 years ago
- Founder: Josef Schwarz
- Headquarters: Bad Wimpfen, Germany (LD Stiftung); Neckarsulm, Germany (Lidl Stiftung & Co. KG)
- Number of locations: 12,200 (2023)
- Area served: Europe: Austria Belgium Bulgaria Croatia Cyprus Czech Republic Denmark Estonia Finland France Germany Greece Hungary Ireland Italy Latvia Lithuania Luxembourg Malta Netherlands Poland Portugal Romania Serbia Slovakia Slovenia Spain Sweden Switzerland United Kingdom; United States
- Key people: Kenneth McGrath (CEO); Dieter Schwarz (chairman)
- Products: Discount supermarkets
- Revenue: €132.1 billion (2024)
- Number of employees: 376,000 (2023)
- Parent: Schwarz Group
- Website: info.lidl

Lidl (German: [ˈliːdl̩] LEE-dl) is a German supermarket brand trademark used by two international discount supermarket chains from Germany. LD Stiftung operates the stores in Germany and Lidl Stiftung & Co. KG in 30 other countries. LD Stiftung is headquartered in Bad Wimpfen and Lidl Stiftung & Co. KG in Neckarsulm, both in the state of Baden-Württemberg. Both sister companies belong to the Schwarz Group, which also includes hypermarket chain Kaufland.

Lidl is the chief competitor of the German discount chain Aldi in several markets.

== History ==
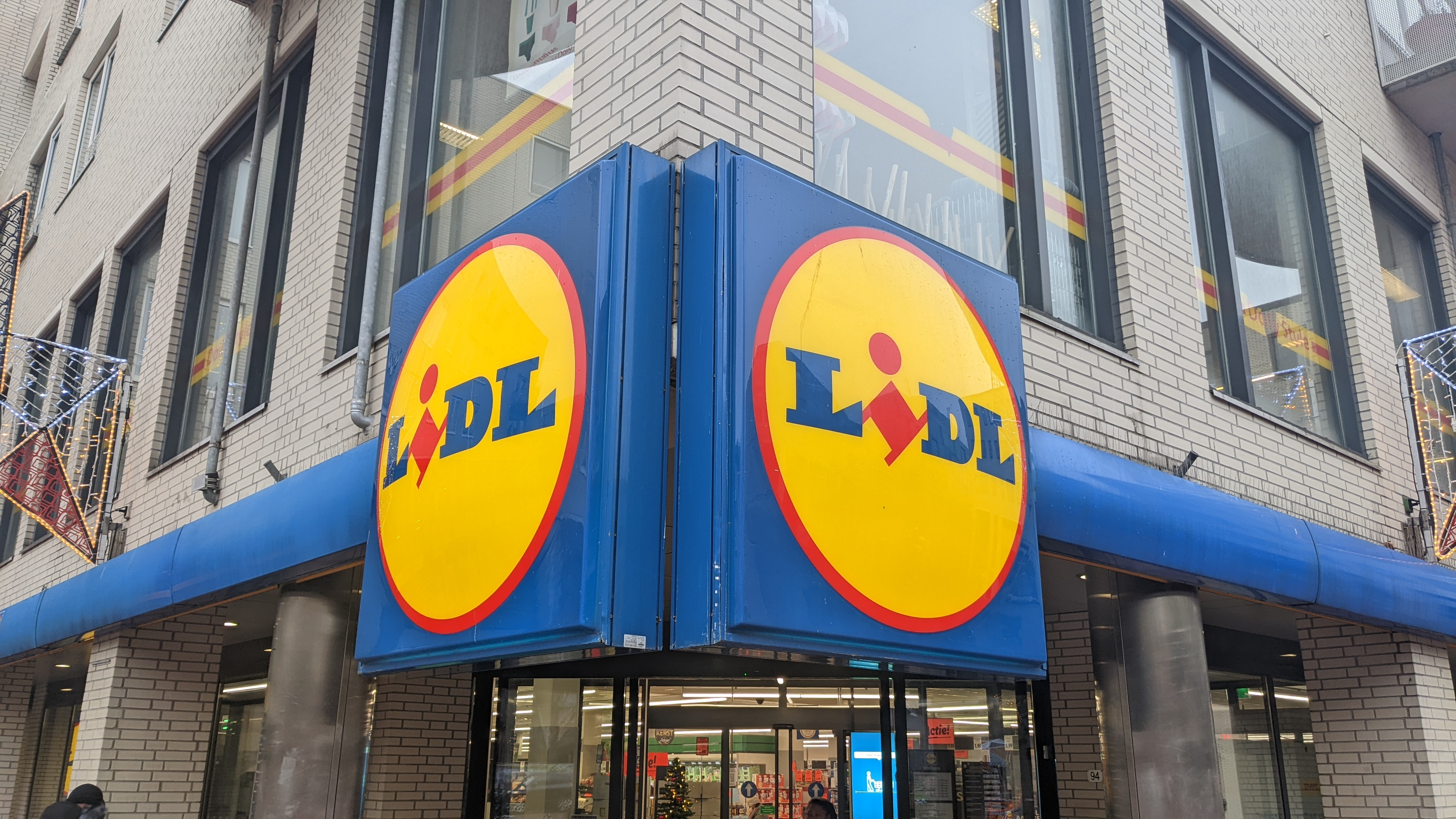
Lidl store in Amsterdam, Netherlands

In 1930, Josef Schwarz became a partner in a Heilbronn-based company named Südfrüchte Großhandlung Lidl & Co. The company had been established by Anton Lidl since at least 1858 under the name A. Lidl & Cie, and specialised in the sale of exotic fruit. Schwarz renamed the company Lidl & Schwarz KG and expanded it into a food wholesaler.

In 1977, under his son Dieter Schwarz, the Schwarz Group began to focus on discount markets, larger supermarkets, and cash and carry wholesale markets. Dieter did not want to use the name Schwarz-Markt (lit. 'black market') and wanted to use the name of his father's former business partner, A. Lidl, but legal reasons prevented him from using that name for his discount stores. When he discovered a newspaper article about a painter and retired schoolteacher Ludwig Lidl, he bought the rights to the name from him for 1,000 German marks.

The Lidl trademark and the two sister companies are part of the Schwarz Group, the fifth-largest retailer in the world with sales of €104.3 billion (2018).

The first Lidl discount store was opened in 1973, copying the Aldi concept. Schwarz rigorously removed merchandise that did not sell from the shelves, and cut costs by keeping the size of the retail outlets as small as possible. By 1977, the Lidl chain comprised 33 discount stores.

Lidl opened its first UK store in 1994. Its grocery market share in the UK was 8.1% in June 2025. In May 2026, Lidl overtook Morrisons to become the fifth largest supermarket chain in Great Britain, with an 8.6% market share, behind fellow German discount-focused chain Aldi.

Sven Seidel was appointed CEO of the company in March 2014, after the previous CEO Karl-Heinz Holland stepped down. Holland had been chief executive since 2008 but left due to undisclosed "unbridgeable" differences over future strategy. Seidel stepped down from his position in February 2017 after Manager Magazin reported he had fallen out of favour with Klaus Gehrig, who has headed the Schwarz Group since 2004. Seidel was succeeded as CEO by Danish businessman Jesper Højer, previously head of Lidl's international buying operation.

In June 2015, the company announced it would establish a United States headquarters in Arlington, Virginia. Lidl has major distribution centers in Mebane, North Carolina, and Spotsylvania County, Virginia. The company initially focused on opening locations in East Coast states, between Pennsylvania and Georgia, and as far west as Ohio. In June 2017, Lidl opened its first stores in the United States in Virginia Beach, Virginia, and other mid-Atlantic cities. The company planned to open a total of one hundred U.S. stores by the summer of 2018. In November 2018, Lidl announced plans to acquire 27 Best Market stores in New York and New Jersey. In December 2018, Lidl opened its first location in New York City, in the Staten Island Mall. The company continued to expand throughout the eastern U.S., with over 100 stores by the end of 2020. In August 2020, Lidl announced that it planned to open another 50 stores in the U.S. by the end of 2021. As of 2024 there were 173 stores in the US.

In 2021, Lidl planned to phase out the selling of cigarettes in all its Dutch stores by 2024 as part of the "smoke-free generation".

In April 2022, Lidl postponed its expansion in Ukraine due to Russia's invasion of the country.

In 2025, Lidl committed to increase the proportion of sales of plant-based foods by 20 percent from a 2023 baseline by 2030.

== Corporate affairs ==
=== Business trends ===
(Financial year ending February 28):

Revenue in Euro billions
Year	Worldwide (**)	Germany	Ref.
2008/9 (*)	30,85		
2009/10	31,5		
2010/11		15.7	
2011/12			
2012/13	48.9	16.7	
2013/14	54.0	18.0	
2014/15	59.0		
2015/16	64.6		
2016/17	67.9		
2017/18	74.6	21.4	
2018/19	81.2	22.7	
2019/20	89.0	23.6	
2020/21	96.3	28.3	
2021/22	100.8	29.7	
2022/23	114.8	30.1	
2023/24	125.5	33.4	
2024/25	132.1	31.9	
2025/26	140.2		

(*) First corporate annual report
(**) According to the annual report

=== Business model ===
Map of countries in which Lidl is active as of July 2025: Currently active Planned expansion / Formerly active

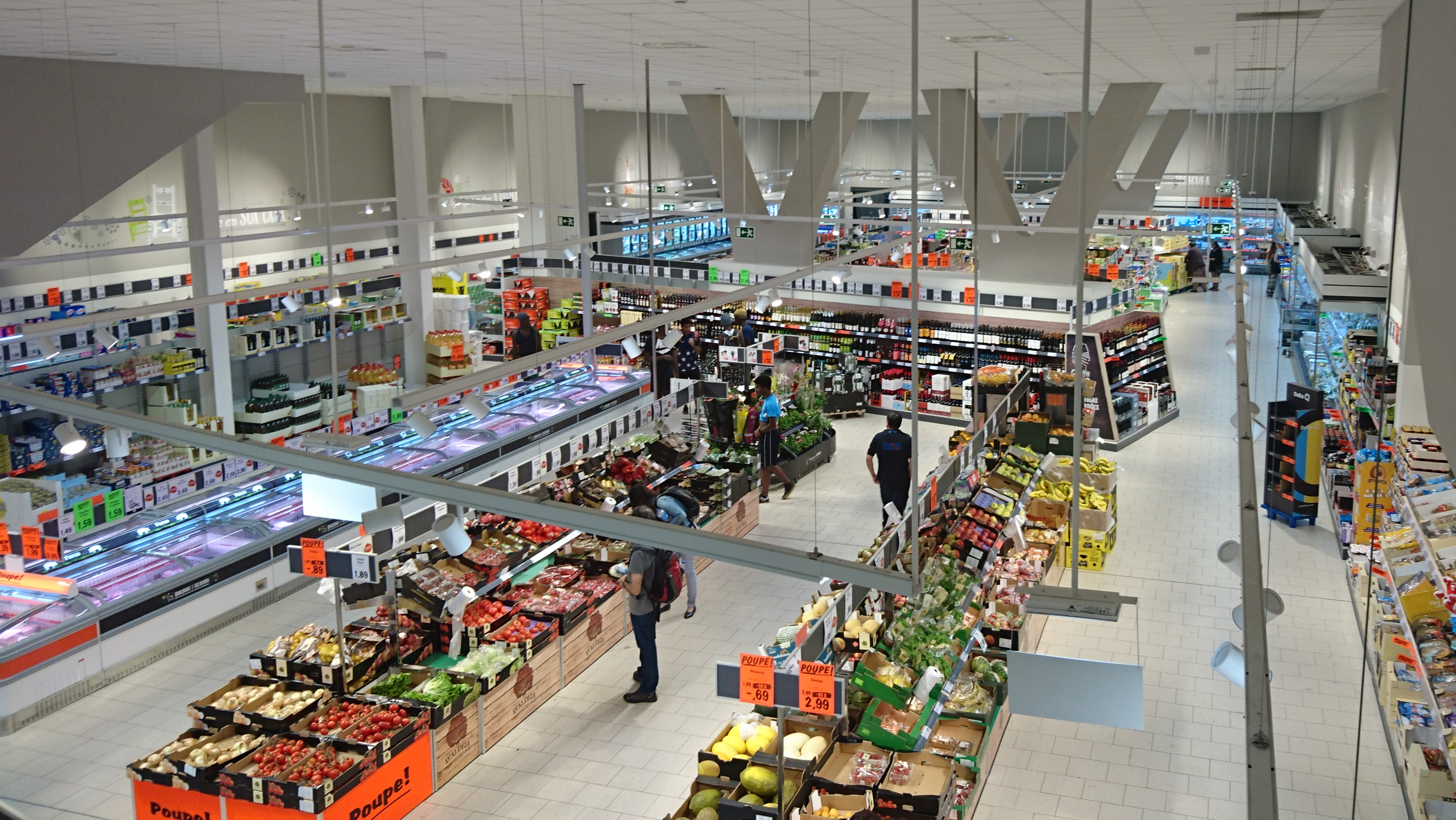
Interior of a Lidl store at Entrecampos railway station, Lisbon

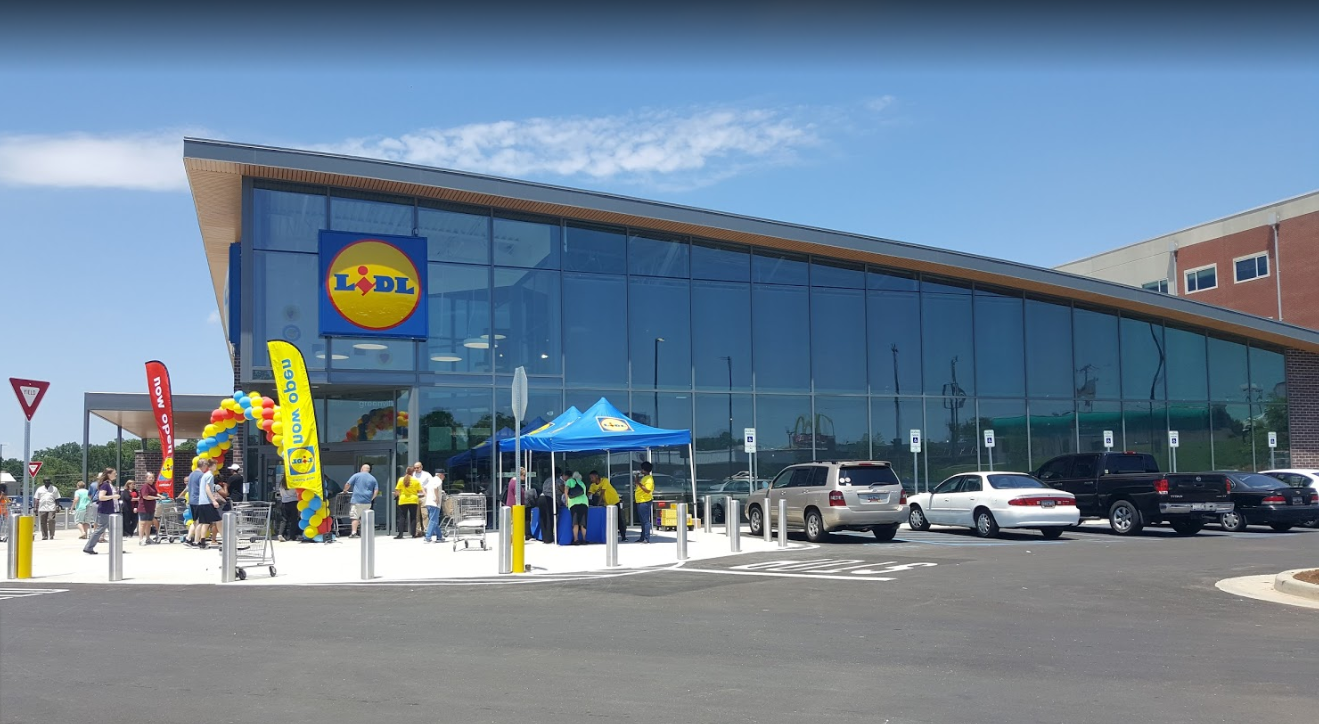
A Lidl store in Greenville, South Carolina, United States

Like fellow German discounter Aldi, Lidl has a zero waste, no-frills, "pass-the-savings-to-the-consumer" approach of displaying most products in their original delivery cardboard boxes, allowing the customers to take the product directly from the box. When the box is empty, it is simply replaced with a full one. Staffing is minimal. Stores typically only have a team of between 17 and 25, depending on store size, and everyone from management to customer assistants is multiskilled, from working delivery at 5 a.m., jumping on the tills or baking and completing the promotional changeovers for the middle of Lidl. Lidl operate with a strict efficiency and speed approach to all tasks; some shifts only have five members of staff to complete tasks. Staff are expected to be fast and multitask, with most tasks on strict metric timings. Typically staff must have pallets completed within 20 minutes, and staff are also timed on the tills with the target of scanning at least 44 items per minute. One of Lidl's key targets is to get customers through the tills as fast as possible. Stores normally only have one checkout open, with customers expected to load the shopping back into their trolley and move away to pack at the window, allowing staff to get more people through the tills at a high speed and so removing the need to open more tills. Staff often work between 8- and 11-hour shifts.

The Lidl operation in the United Kingdom took a different approach from Germany, with a focus on marketing and public relations, and providing employee benefits not required by law, including paying the independently verified living wage and offering a staff discount. Upmarket products were introduced, especially in the lead-up to Christmas. This required significant investment in marketing to produce sales growth, but it affected Lidl's logistical operation and put pressure on profits. Ronny Gottschlich, who had run Lidl GB for the six years to 2016, was responsible for this approach, which led to friction with the head office, due to the cost involved. In September 2016, Gottschlich unexpectedly left, and was replaced by the Austrian sales and operations director, German national Christian Härtnagel.

== Stores ==
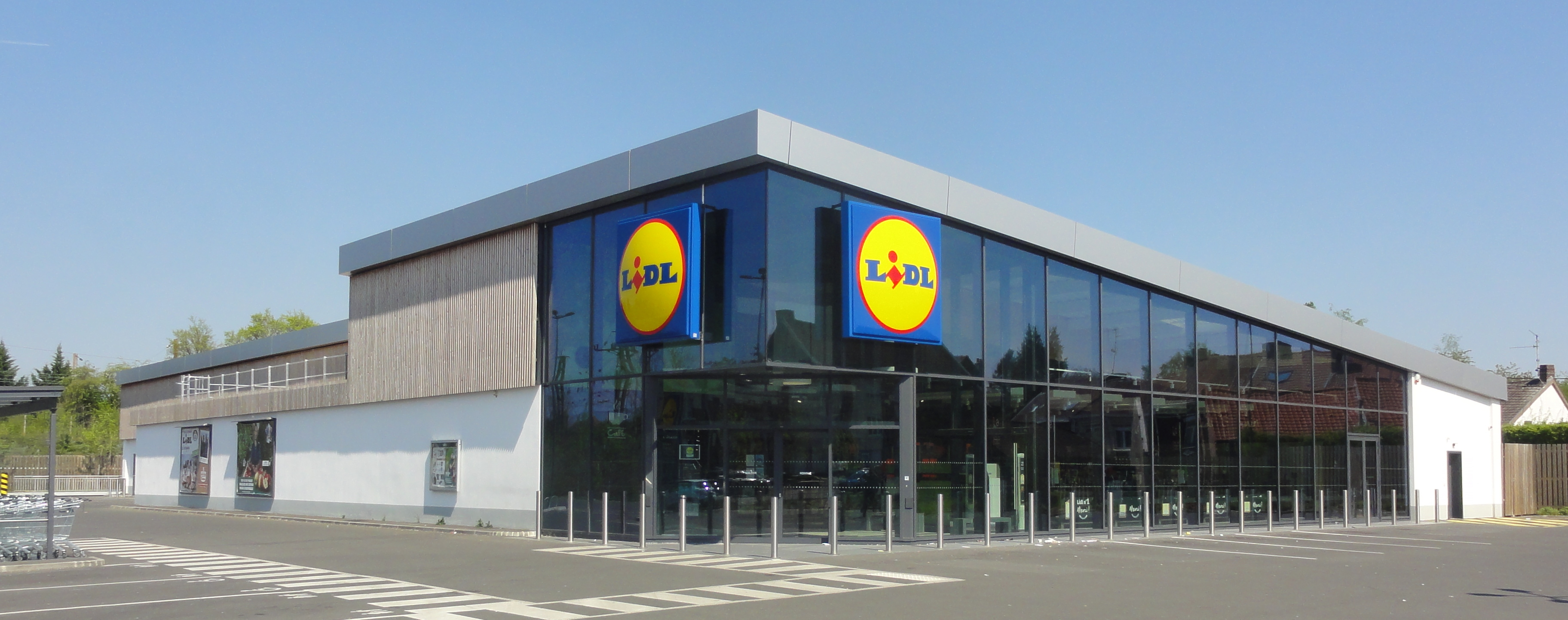
Lidl in Somain, France

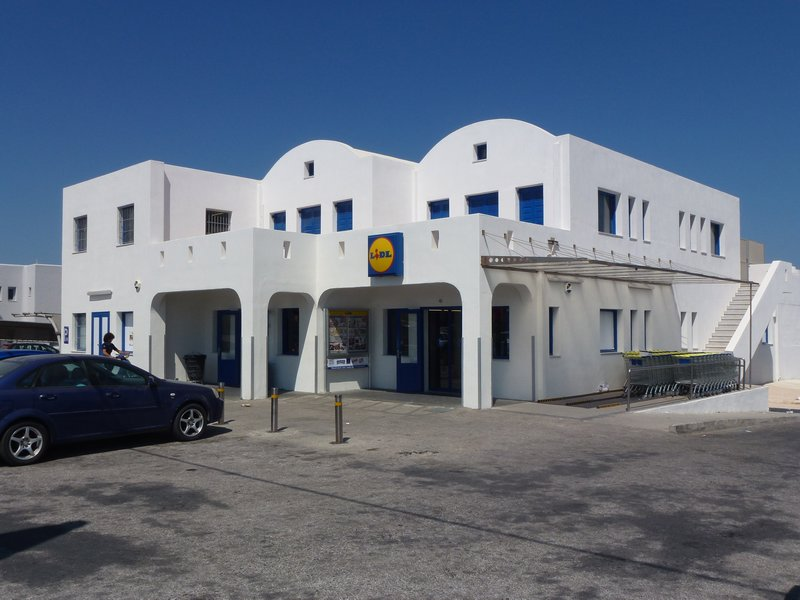
Lidl in Santorini, Greece

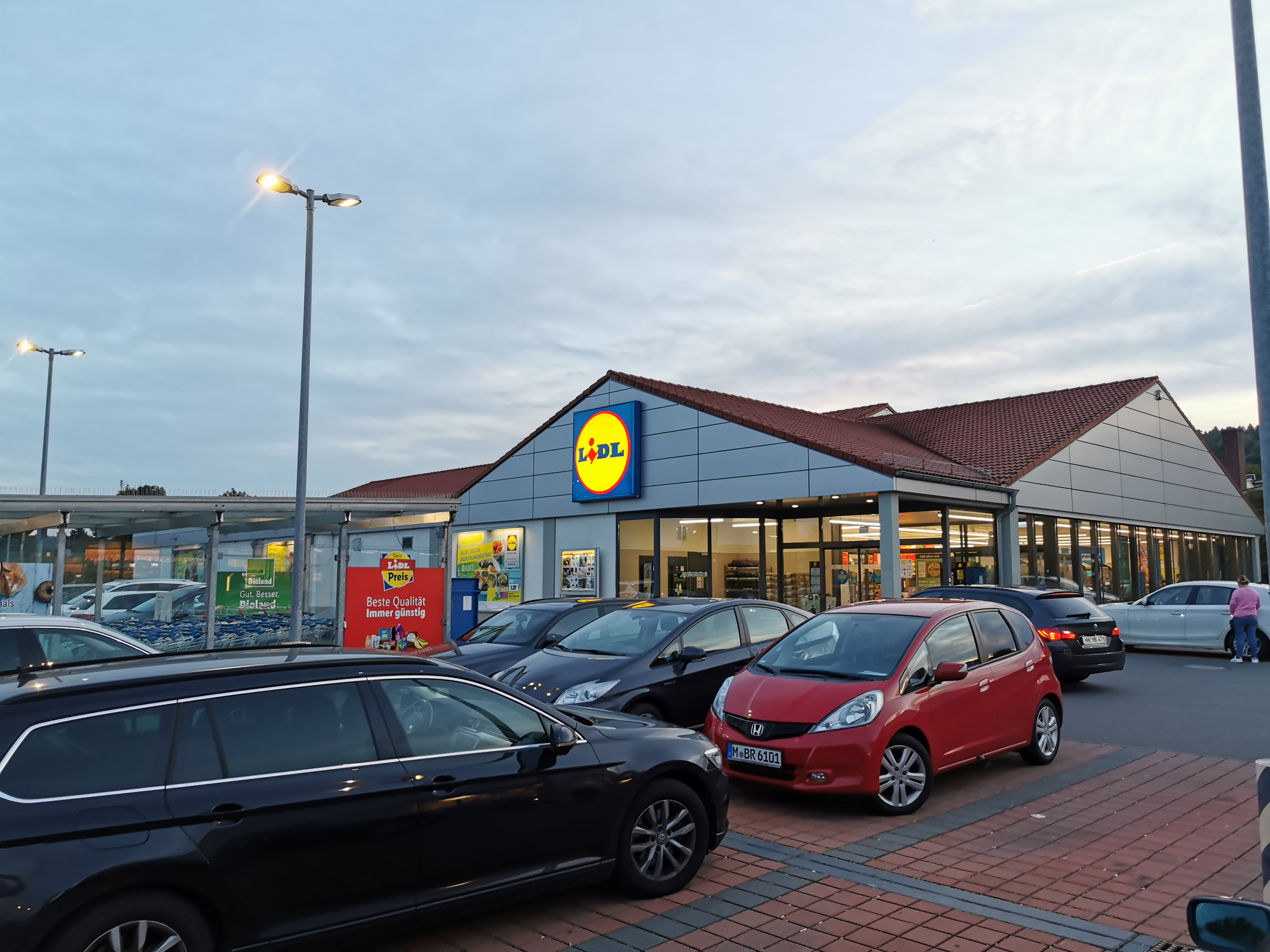
Lidl in Tauberbischofsheim, Germany

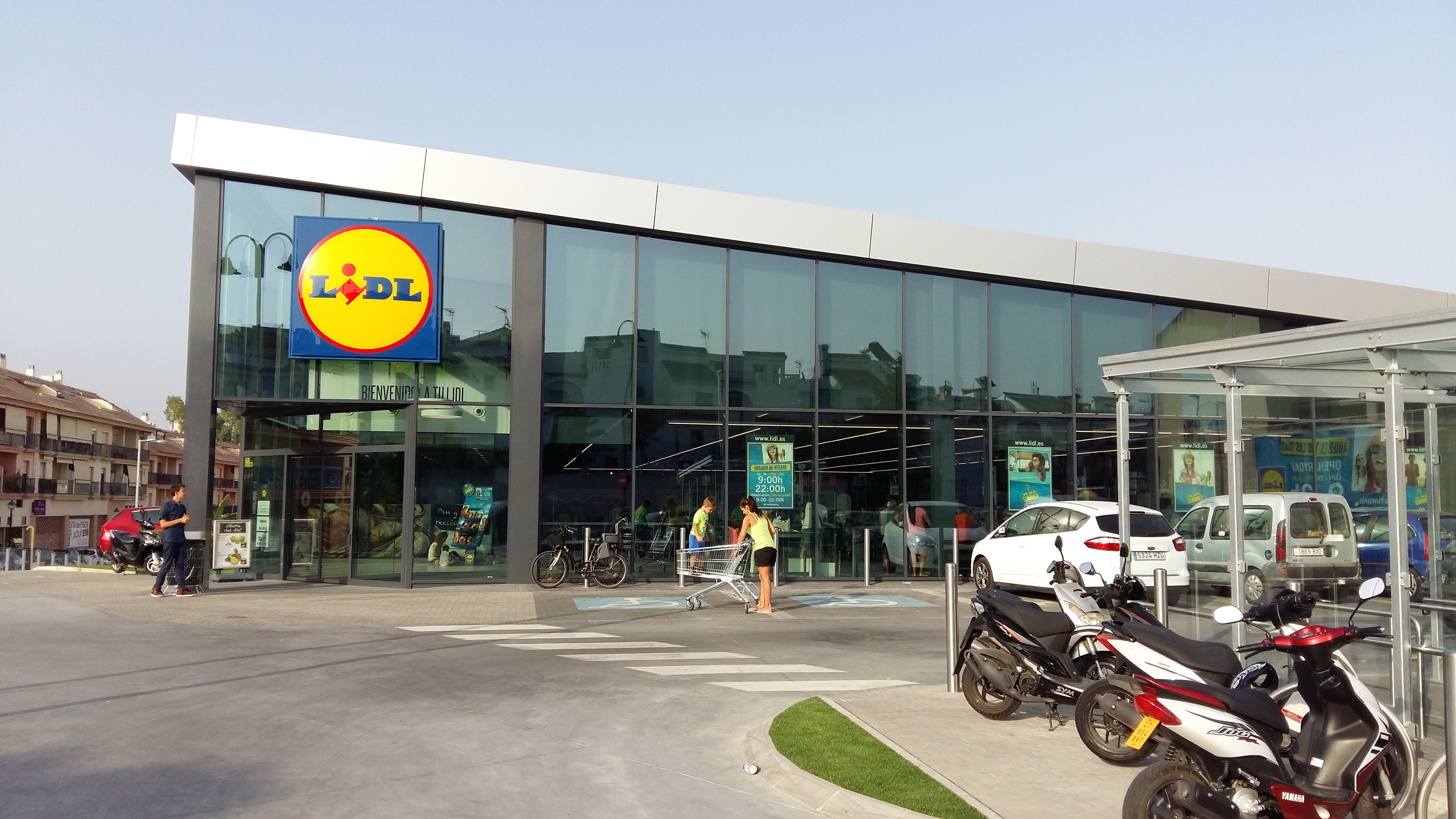
Lidl in Fuengirola, Spain

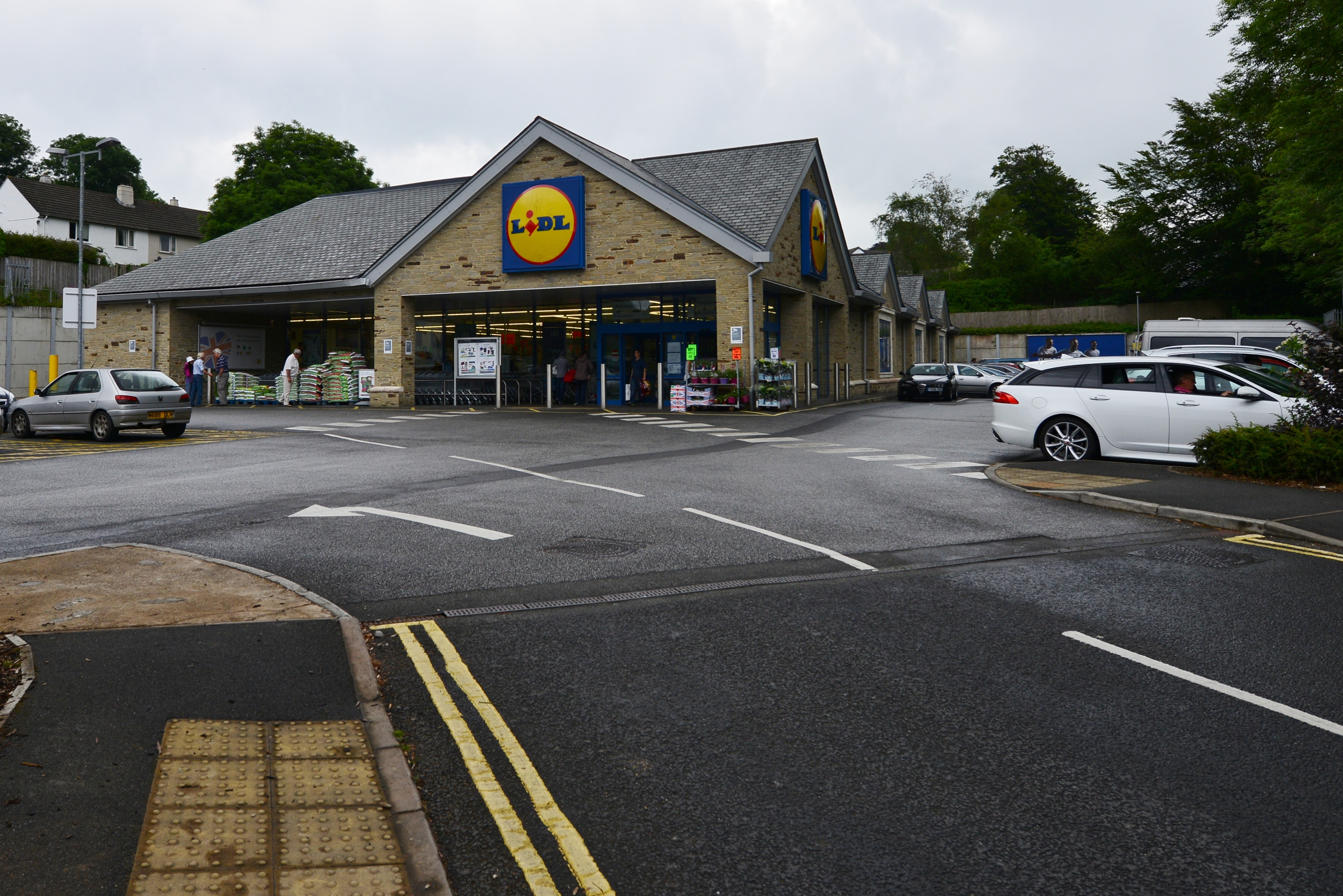
Lidl in Bodmin, United Kingdom

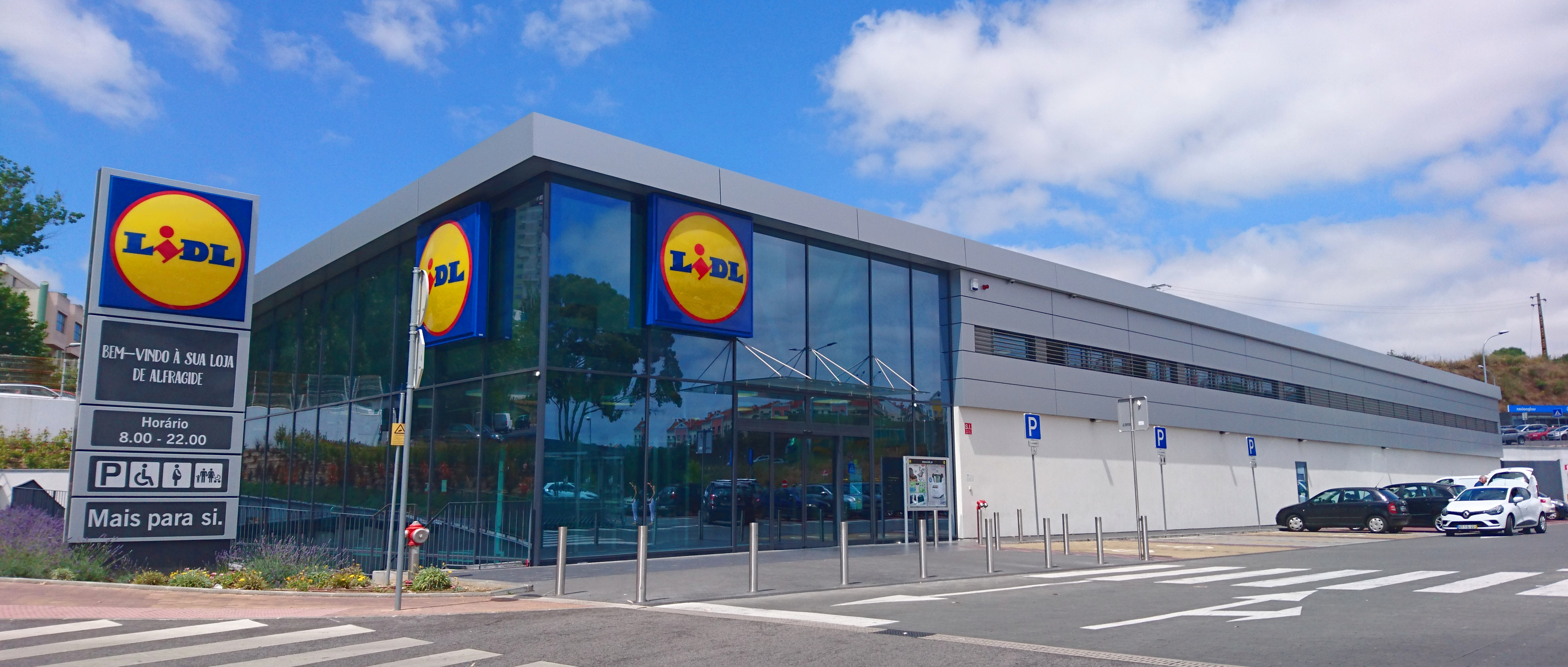
Lidl in Amadora, Portugal

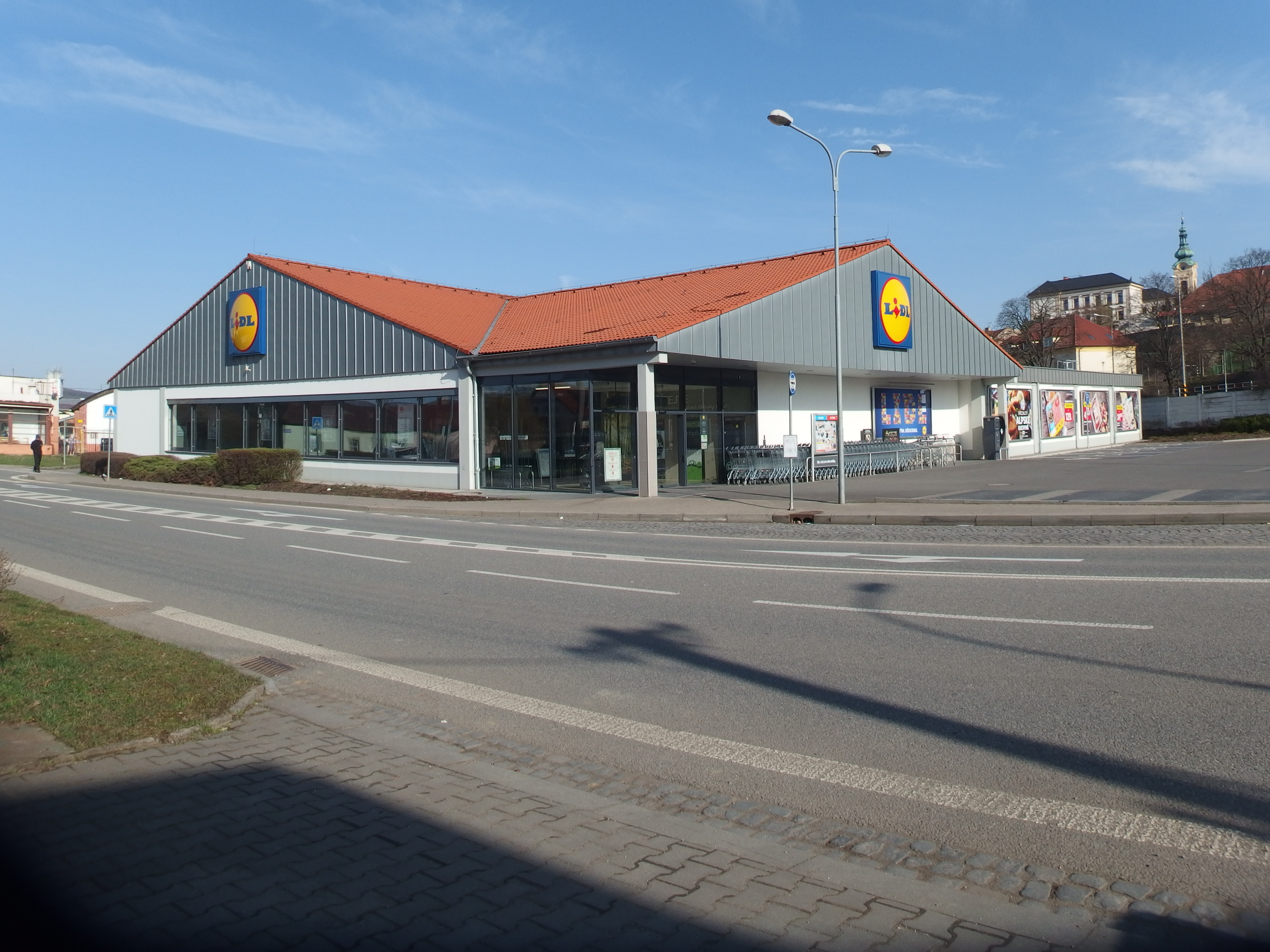
Lidl in Uherský Brod, Czech Republic

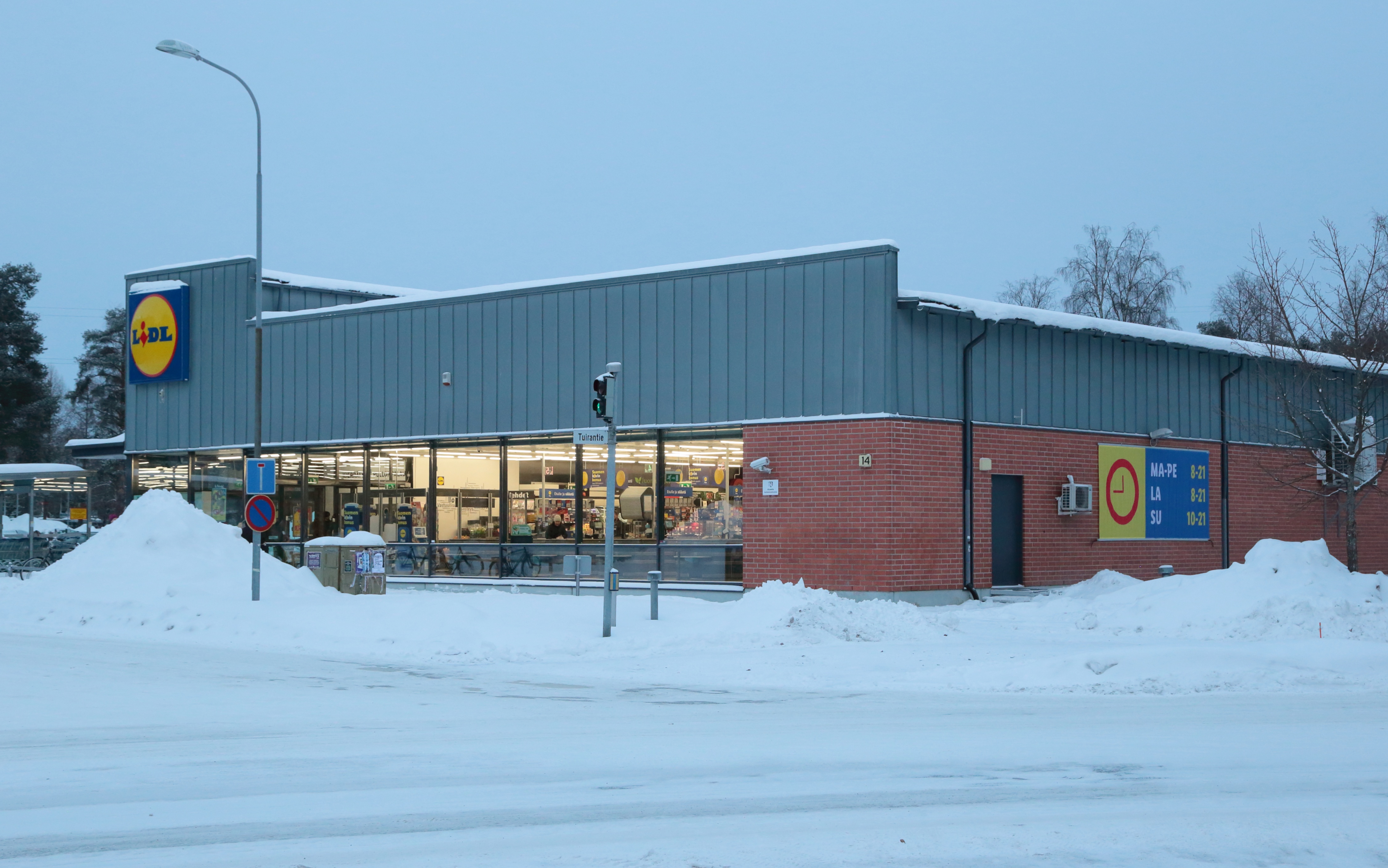
Lidl in Oulu, Finland

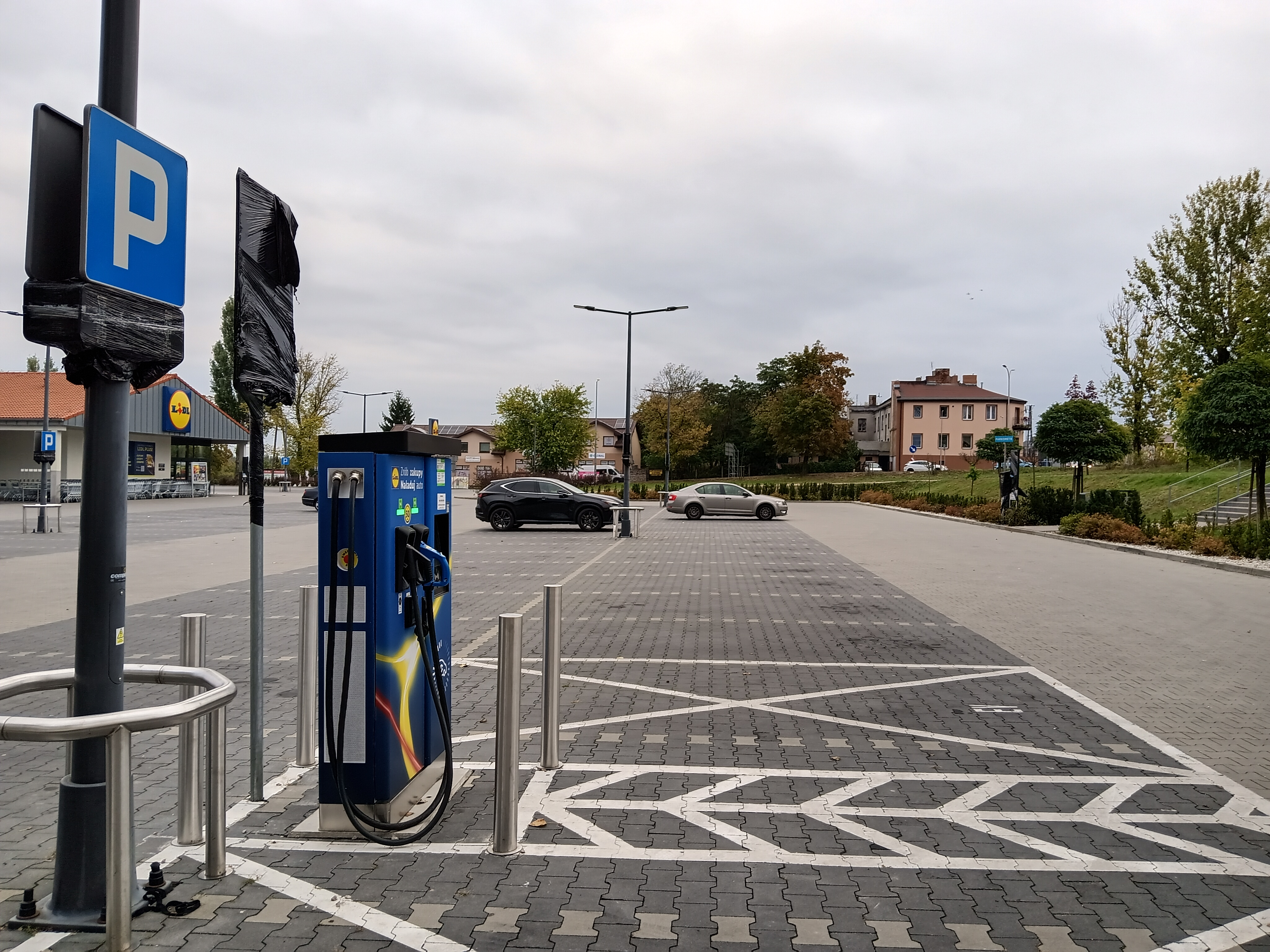
Lidl charging station in Poland

LD Stiftung operates the stores in Germany and Lidl Stiftung GmbH & Co. KG for international stores. Lidl is present with stores in around 32 countries.

Store numbers as of September 2026
Country	Year opened	Stores	Warehouses	Number of employees	Ref.
Total		13,042 ▲	186 + 3 (u.c.)	393,520	
Germany	1973	3,287 ▲	39	100,000	
France	1989	1,655 ▲	26	45,000	
Great Britain (Note: England: 848 stores, Scotland: 113 stores, Wales: 60 stores)	1994	1,021 ▲	14	33,800	
Poland	2002	1,009 ▲	13 + 1 (u.c.)	29,000	
Italy	1992	818 ▲	12	21,500	
Spain (Note: Spain: 689 stores, Canary Islands: 39 stores, Ceuta: 1 store, Melilla: 1 store)	1994	730 ▲	5	19,000	
Netherlands	1997	441 ▬	7	21,000	
Romania	2011	411 ▲	6	12,000	
Czech Republic	2003	329 ▲	5 + 1 (Note: 1 warehouse for e-commerce)	13,900	
Belgium	1995	301 ▼	5	10,000	
Portugal	1995	297 ▲	4 + 1 (u.c.)	8,000	
Austria	1998	259 ▲	3	5,800	
Greece	1999	234 ▬	5	6,500	
Hungary	2004	221 ▲	4 + 1 (u.c.)	8,500	
Sweden	2003	212 ▲	3	5,600	
Finland	2002	210 ▲	3	5,750	
United States	2017	203 ▲	5	5,000	
Switzerland	2009	198 ▲	3	4,500	
Ireland	2000	193 ▲	3	6,000	
Slovakia	2004	184 ▲	3	6,000	
Denmark	2005	171 ▲	2	4,300	
Bulgaria	2010	146 ▲	2	4,300	
Croatia	2006	116 ▲	3	3,900	
Lithuania	2016	88 ▲	2	2,800	
Serbia	2018	87 ▲	2	3,250	
Slovenia (Note: Management through Lidl Croatia)	2007	69 ▬	2	2,000	
Northern Ireland (Note: Management through Lidl Ireland)	1999	45 ▲	1	1,200	
Latvia (Note: Management through Lidl Lithuania)	2021	39 ▲	1	1,350	
Cyprus	2010	22 ▲	1	700	
Estonia (Note: Management through Lidl Lithuania)	2022	22 ▲	0 (Note: Supplied by Lidl Latvia)	650	
Luxembourg (Note: Management through Lidl Belgium)	2001	13 ▬	0 (Note: Supplied by Lidl Belgium)	420	
Malta (Note: Malta: 11 stores, Gozo: 1 store)	2008	12 ▲	1 (Note: Cooperation with Lidl Italy)	550	

=== Future markets ===
Country	Opening year	Notes	Ref.
Andorra	End of 2026	Under construction	
Liechtenstein	2029	Under construction	
Bosnia and Herzegovina (management through Lidl Serbia)	Late 2026 or early 2027	Under construction	
Albania	Late 2026 or early 2027	Under construction	
Kosovo	TBD	Expansion confirmed due to a launched careers page.	
Montenegro (management through Lidl Serbia; Supply through Lidl Bosnia and Herzegovina)	2026	Under construction	
North Macedonia (management through Lidl Bulgaria)	Spring 2027	Under construction	

=== Former markets ===
Country	Year opened	Year closed	Notes	Ref.
Norway	2004	2008	Closed due to poor sales and political issues.	

== Tailwind shipping - Gartner KG ==
In July 2022 Lidl founded the "Tailwind Shipping Lines GmbH & Co. KG" which is headquartered in Hamburg. The shipping company operates a total of eleven container ships (6,864 - 1,200 TEU) to transport goods from Asia to Europe. Some of the ships are owned, others are chartered. In addition there are 33,000 containers, 1,000 of which are freezer containers. In June 2025 it was announced, that Tailwind had ordered five medium-sized container ships with up to 8,400 TEU. The contract to build the ships was awarded in early 2025 by the Hamburg shipping company "Peter Döhle" and the order was then taken over by Tailwind. Each ship will cost approximately €100 million. Delivery will take place in 2027 and 2028. In June 2026, Tailwind announced that all ships would sail under the German flag in the future. Heilbronn will be the home port.

In July 2024, it was announced that a Schwarz Group investment company had acquired a 35% stake in the Austrian freight forwarder Gartner. With 2200 trucks and 3600 trailers, Gartner is one of Europe's largest freight forwarders. There are 24 branches in 10 countries and 3900 employees.

== Private brands ==
=== Production ===
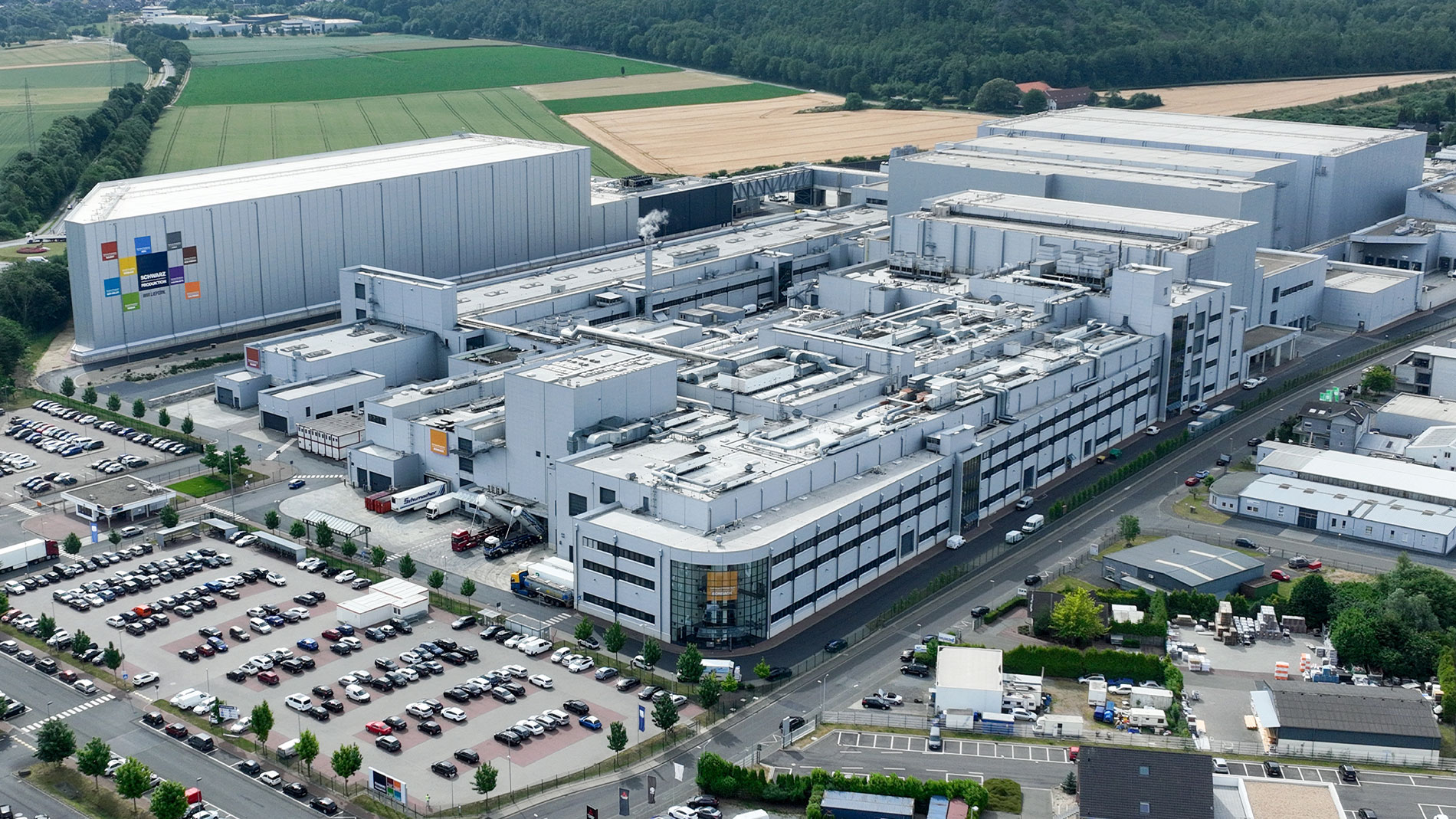
Factory in Übach-Palenberg

Lidl does not produce anything itself; sister company Schwarz Produktion produces private label goods exclusively for Lidl and Kaufland. MEG Weißenfels GmbH & Co. KG, a sister company of Schwarz, operates five bottling plants in Germany and one in Great Britain. In March 2009, construction began on a factory for chocolate bars in Übach-Palenberg.

At the start of production in 2012, the hourly output was 1,050 chocolate bars. To date, the hourly output has been increased to 100,000 bars. The chocolate mass is not produced in-house, but delivered. At the same time as the chocolate factory, a plant for packing nuts, nut mixes, and dried fruits was built and put into operation in 2010. Nuts and dried fruits are supplied by specialized processors. Parallel to the chocolate factory, a large bakery for frozen dough pieces was built in Übach-Palenberg. These are baked and sold in the bakery shops of the Lidl and Kaufland stores in Europe. The property area in Übach-Palenberg is approximately 250,000 m^{2} (2,690,978 sq ft) and almost completely built up. In addition, there is a 150,000 m^{2} (1,614,587 sq ft) plot on the other side of the street, with a truck parking area which is connected to the main building area by a bridge.

A coffee roastery was put into operation in Rheine in March 2022 with an annual capacity of 50,000 tons. A nut roastery was built on the same site in 2024. The annual capacity for packaging nuts and dried fruit is 47,000 metric tons. In total, a high-bay warehouse with 52,000 pallet spaces is available here.

In September 2022, Papierfabrik Maxau, with 440 employees, was acquired from Stora Enso for €210 million.

Lidl purchased company Erfurter Teigwaren GmbH (renamed to Bon Pasta GmbH) in Erfurt in October 2022. With 170 employees, 110,000 tons of durum wheat pasta are produced annually. In November 2023, it was announced that the bakery Artiback (renamed to Bonback Halle (Saale) GmbH) in Halle (Saale) had been purchased. Artiback produces frozen baked goods with 160 employees on two baking lines. Production was significantly expanded in 2025. The number of employees was increased to 400.

The Göbber Group, including companies Göbber GmbH, DHI GmbH, Eystruper Land GmbH, and Friedrich Göbber GmbH, was acquired on October 1, 2025. Founded in 1888, the company employs 350 people and produces over 70,000 tons of jams, fruitsyrups, fruit fillings, fruit spreads, and honey products.

=== List ===
- Alesto (snacks, nuts)
- Bellarom Barista (coffee)
- Bon Gelati (ice cream)
- Cien (cosmetics)
- Fin Carré (chocolate)
- J.D. Gross (chocolate)
- Milbona (cheese)
- Perlenbacher (German beer)
- Solevita (fruit drinks)
- Silvercrest (appliances)

== Other services ==
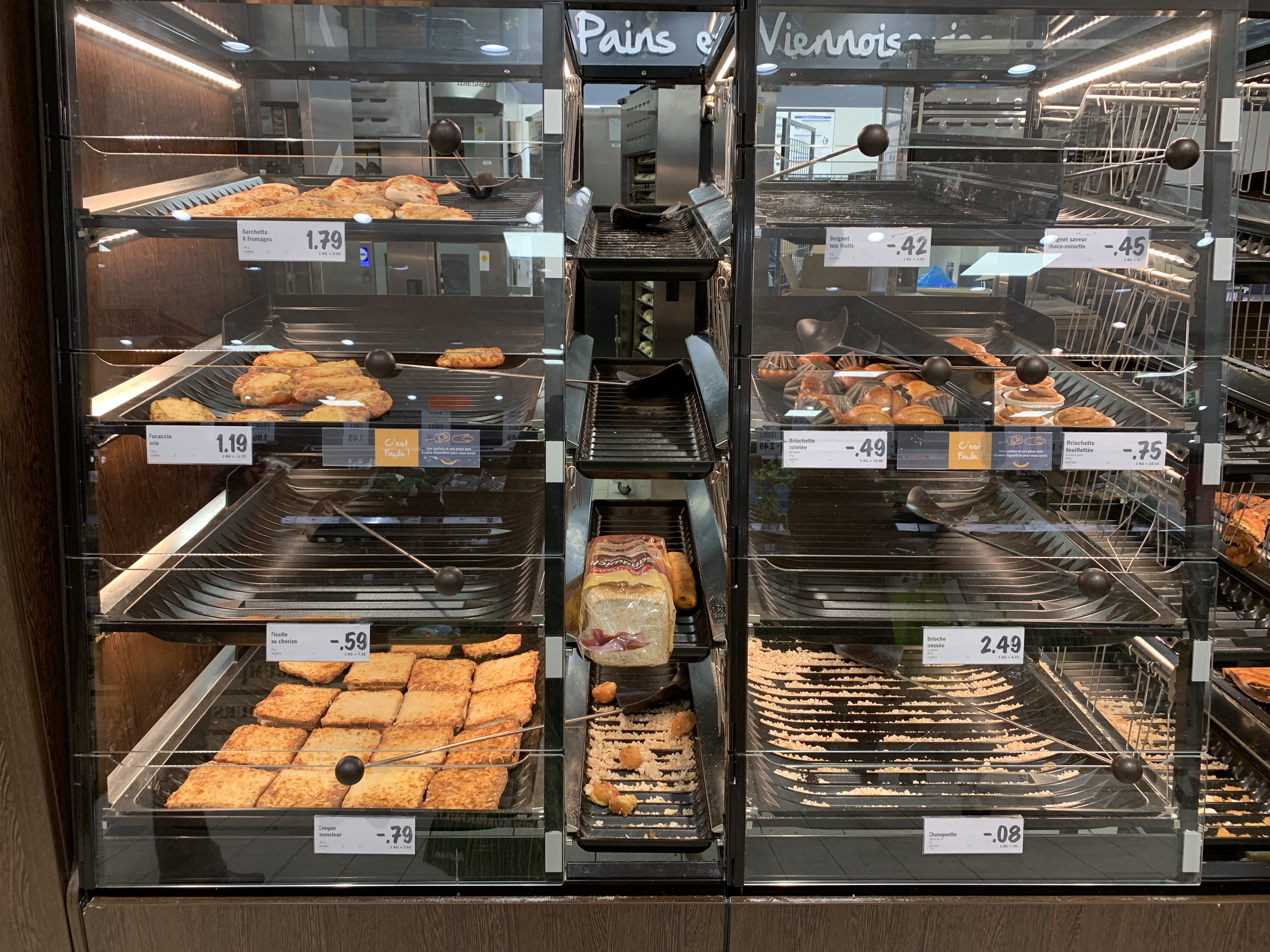
Lidl sometimes offers products made in-store, for example the products offered in this self-service bakery in a French store.

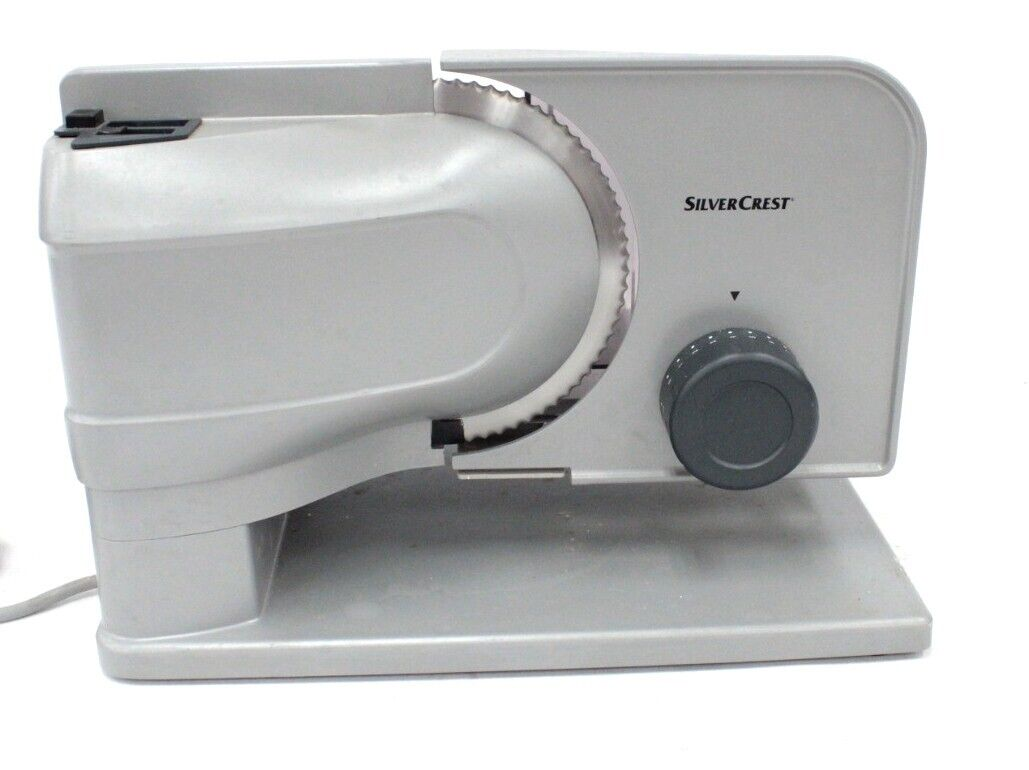
A kitchen appliance branded as Silvercrest, Lidl's own brand for consumer electric appliances

In October 2009, Lidl Movies was launched in the United Kingdom, undercutting Tesco DVD Rental, which had previously been the United Kingdom's cheapest online rental service for DVDs. The service was powered by OutNow DVD Rental. OutNow went into liquidation in October 2011, taking Lidl Movies with it.

In January 2012, Lidl launched bakeries in their stores across Europe. They consist of a small baking area with a number of ovens, together with an area where bread and pastries, such as croissants, are displayed for sale. The bakeries were initially trialed in a limited number of stores, to determine whether there was a demand for freshly baked products in-store.

The mobile phone brand Lidl Connect was launched in Germany in October 2015, in Austria and Switzerland in June and July 2019 and in Ireland in October 2026.

In August 2018, Lidl introduced its "Lidl Plus" supermarket loyalty card via an app on the Apple App Store and Google Play Store. The app is available in most European countries where Lidl operates, offering discounts on own brand products and on partner offers. In several countries, the app also has a bonus program with cashback.

As of May 2019, Lidl US has partnered with Boxed.com to test a home delivery service using the online retailer's technology. Lidl also partners with Target Corporation's subsidiary Shipt for grocery home delivery.

Lidl also runs Representative Offices in Mainland China, Hong Kong, and Bangladesh, though there is no mention of Lidl stores opening there. Their operations are likely limited to overseeing manufacturing contracts for most of non-food products, offered in Lidl stores, with local manufacturers based in these countries.

In September 2025, Lidl announced it would implement a Scan and Go feature into its UK and Ireland Lidl Plus app. In November 2025, Lidl filed for a trademark name of Lidl and Go.

In March 2023, Lidl was announced as the sponsor of the 2023 World Cycling Championship held in Scotland.

In 2026, Lidl announced that it would be opening its first pub next to its in Dundonald, East Belfast, Northern Ireland. The pub is named "The Middle Ale", and opened in June 2026.

== Law and compliance ==
In 1999, a legal case arose between Lidl and Hertford Foods Ltd., one of Lidl's wholesale suppliers. The case also involved TSB Commercial Finance Limited, a finance company to which Hertford had assigned its trade debts, and arose because Hertford had become unable to supply corned beef from Brazil "due to a severe shortage of raw materials". Lidl obtained stocks from another company and deducted costs from the amounts due to Hertford. A dispute about whose standard terms arose. On appeal, Chadwick LJ ruled that Hertford were not entitled to treat their contract as terminated, commenting also that in modern "Battle of the Forms" legal cases,

It may be said to be artificial to attribute to either party knowledge of standard terms contained in a document which has been received in its office; in that, as I suspect, common experience would suggest that busy executives often do not read the fine print in which standard conditions appear.

In 2008, Lidl was accused by journalists of spying on their workers, listening to private phone calls, and sometimes even following them home or to doctor's appointments. In one instance, an employee's file was supposedly annotated to note that most of her friends were "drug users". Lidl responded to these claims, stating that the surveillance was intended to prevent shoplifting, and to detect "abnormal behaviour".

In 2017, Lidl was accused by trade unions in Germany of shutting down stores when workers elect worker councils or opt to engage in collective bargaining with a trade union.

In October 2022, animal welfare NGOs across Europe accused Lidl of a 'chicken scandal'. Investigation footage filmed on a Lidl supplier's farm in Germany showed sick and injured chickens unable to walk and lying in their own waste. Further investigations in Italy and Austria also revealed severe chicken welfare issues. In the Austrian investigation footage, birds were seen attempting to eat the rotting carcasses of other dead chickens. The chickens in the footage are fast-growing breeds, which reach their kill weight in just 35 days and have higher levels of mortality, lameness and muscle disease than slower-growing breeds. NGOs have called on the supermarket to sign up to the Better Chicken Commitment (BCC), a set of welfare standards which prohibits the use of fast-growing breeds and requires the provision of more space and enrichment for chickens. While Lidl France already committed to the BCC in 2020, Lidl have so far not made a commitment for the rest of their European operations.

In 2023, amid a widespread boycott movement against Israeli businesses and products, Lidl stores faced criticism after several customers in France and Belgium complained that the store mislabeled products of Israeli origin as originating from other countries, such as Morocco. The Lidl group attributed the issue to a display error. According to the General Directorate of Competition, Consumption & Repression of Frauds (DGCCRF), which oversees the legality and safety of products and services in France, "food presented for sale must offer clear and precise labelling in order to better inform the consumer".

In 2025, Lidl faced legal action in Northern Ireland over plans to open a pub next to its store in Dundonald, East Belfast. Licensing laws in Northern Ireland operate under the ‘surrender principle', capping the number of licenses granted until an existing licensed premises surrenders theirs. Once a surrendered license is obtained, businesses also need to pass an ‘inadequacy’ test, which needs to prove that there is an inadequate number of licensed premises in the area where a supermarket would begin selling. While Lidl was unable to pass the inadequacy test for an off-licence ‘licence’ in their shop in Dundonald, they were able to pass the inadequacy test for a pub, leading to the decision to open a pub in that location. Rival supermarkets launched challenge in the High Court, after claiming that Lidl’s pub plans were part of an "unlawful loophole" to operate an off-licence. The claim was ultimately dismissed by the High Court, with the presiding Judge noting the fact that "the application was a novel one is not a reason for refusing it".
