= Lidl Austria =

Lidl Österreich GmbH
- Company type: GmbH
- Industry: Retail
- Headquarters: Salzburg, Austria
- Key people: Alessandro Wolf
- Revenue: €1.47 billion (2020/21)
- Number of employees: 5500 (2021)
- Website: www.lidl.at

The Lidl Austria GmbH (Note: A GmbH is a "company with limited liability" in German-speaking countries) is a subsidiary of Lidl Stiftung & Co. KG, part of the Schwarz Group. Lidl Austria's core assortment includes groceries, with a focus on over 2000 products, many of which are sourced locally from Austria. The company emphasizes a wide range of fresh and packaged food products.

== History ==
Lidl has been in Austria since 1998 with its headquarters in Salzburg, making it a prominent player in the grocery retail industry.

== Company structure ==
Lidl Austria operates three logistics centers in Austria and is structured as a company with limited liability (GmbH).

== Other services ==
In addition to its core grocery retail business, Lidl Austria offers various services to its customers. These services include Lidl Plus, a digital customer card system offering discounts, Lidl Connect, a mobile virtual network operator, and Lidl Energie, which provides electricity and gas products. The company has also expanded into areas like Lidl Reisen (Lidl Travel) and Lidl Fotos (Lidl Photos), offering diverse services beyond traditional retail.

== Management ==
The management of Lidl Austria GmbH includes key individuals responsible for the company's operations and strategies.

- Alessandro Wolf - Current leader of the company.
- Hanno Rieger - Former leader of Lidl Austria.
