= Franziska Seidl =

Austrian physicist (1892–1983)

- Born: Franziska Vicari; 1 July 1892; Vienna, Austria-Hungary
- Died: 14 June 1983 (aged 90); Vienna, Austria
- Citizenship: Austria (from 1892); Czechoslovakia (from 1918)
- Education: University of Vienna
- Spouse: Wenzel Seidl (m. 1911; died 1916)
- Awards: Decoration of Honour for Services to the Republic of Austria (1968)
- Scientific career
- Fields: Physics
- Doctoral advisor: Ernst Lecher

Franziska Seidl (née Vicari; 1 July 1892 – 14 June 1983) was an Austrian physicist. She was professor for experimental physics at the University of Vienna. One of her main research areas was ultrasound.

== Biography ==
Franziska was born in Vienna to Franz and Maria Vicari, née Anton, who were proprietors of a small business. She attended primary and secondary school and received musical education. In 1911, she married Wenzel Seidl (born 1881 in České Budějovice, Bohemia), a physics and mathematics teacher at a gymnasium in Hranice, Moravia. They lived in Hranice until Wenzel was conscripted in World War I, and died in 1916 at the Isonzo Front.

After the dissolution of Austria-Hungary, Seidl became a citizen of Czechoslovakia. She returned to Vienna, took the Matura (the secondary school exit exam) in 1918, and began to study at the University of Vienna in the same year. Her main subject was physics, with secondary subjects as mathematics and chemistry. She wrote her doctoral thesis on measuring short time intervals with the Helmholtz pendulum, and earned her doctorate in physics in 1923.

Seidl became assistant professor in 1924 and qualified as a professor for experimental physics in 1933. She took over as interim head of the First Physics Institute in 1945 until Felix Ehrenhaft returned from emigration in 1947. She became emeritus in 1963.

== Work ==
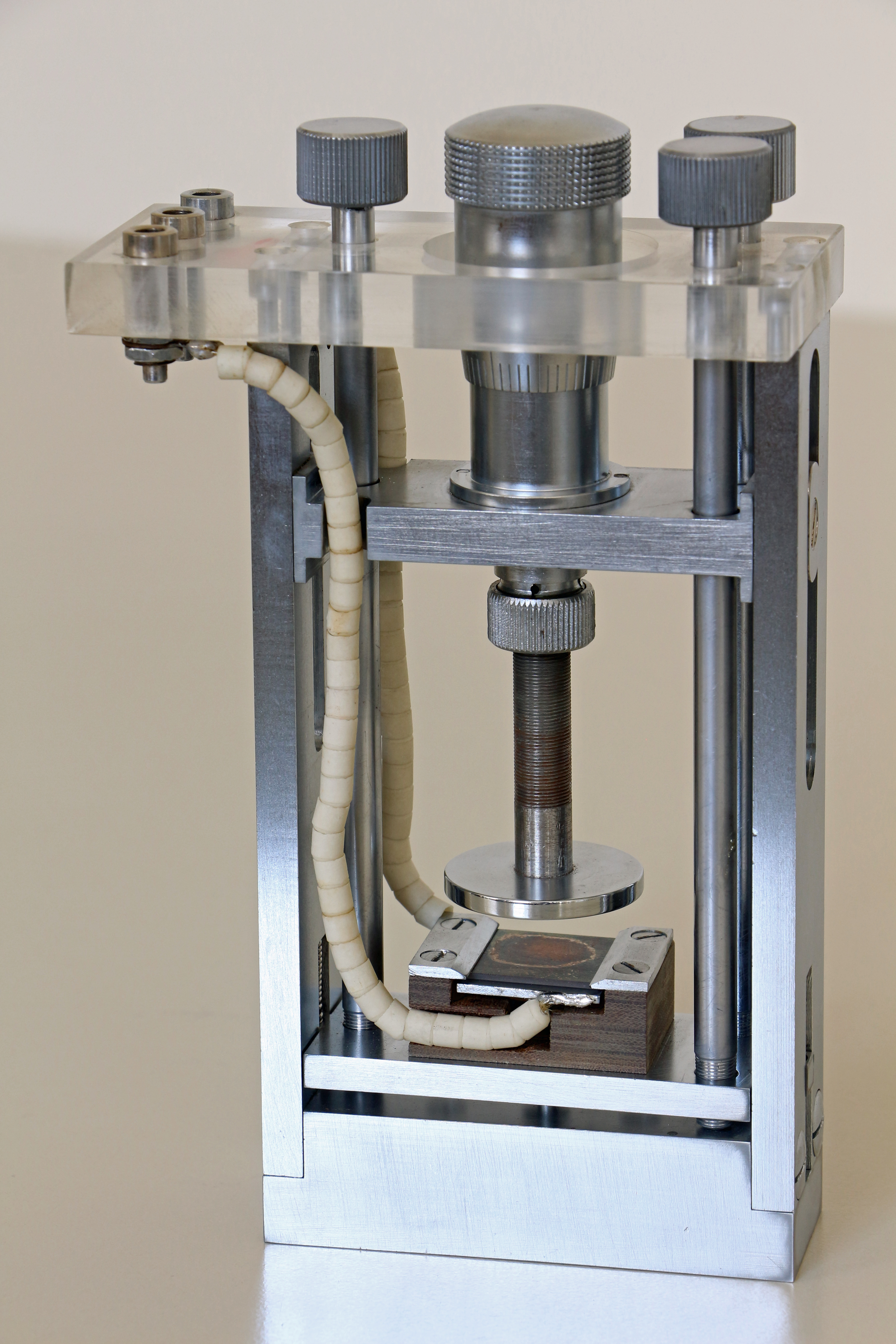
Historic ultrasound apparatus used by Franziska Seidl

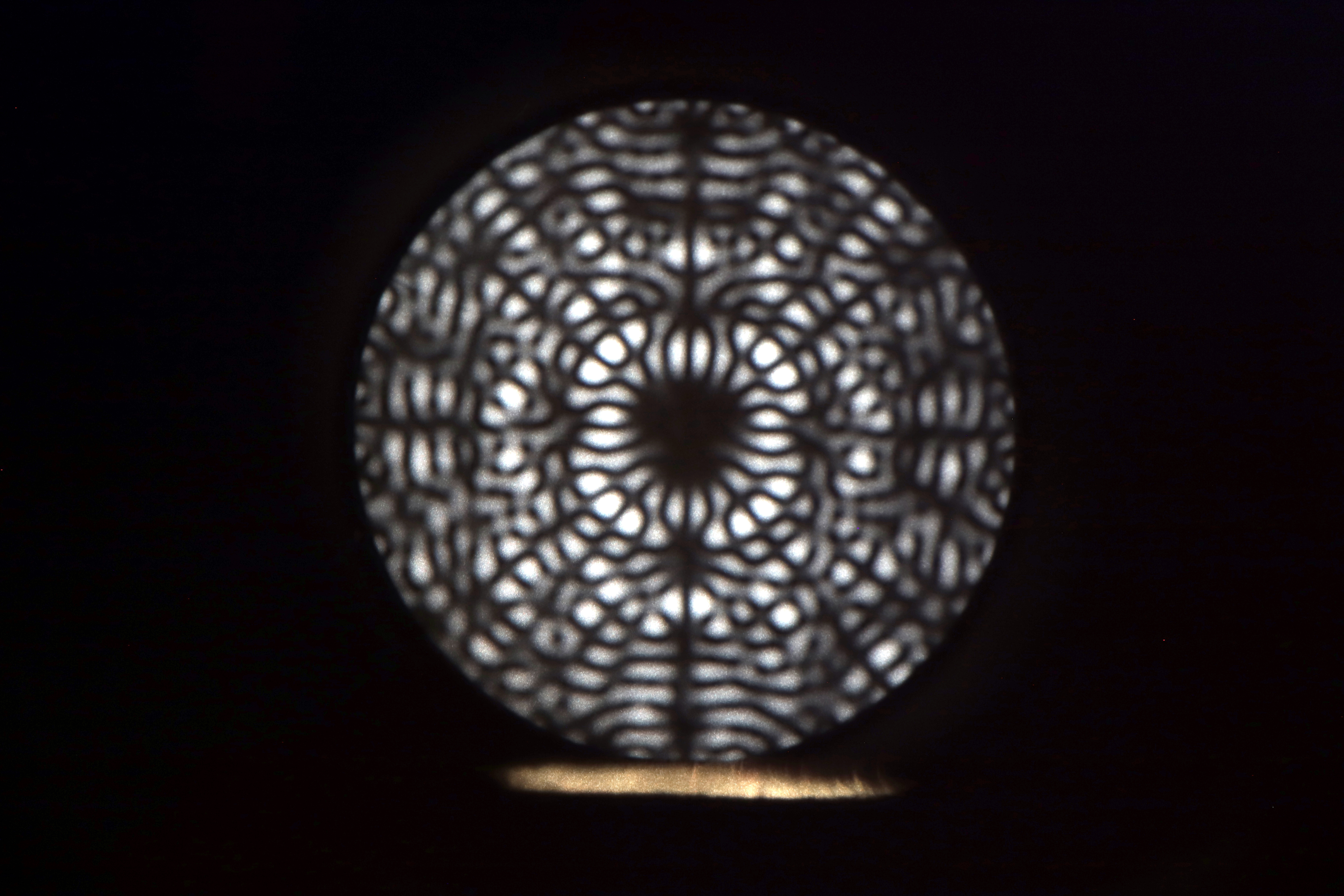
Standing ultrasound waves in a glass cylinder, produced with Franziska Seidl's apparatus and photographed in cross-polarized light

Starting in 1933, Seidl regularly held lectures and supervised students' courses and doctoral theses. A main focus of her work was the education and training of physics teachers. From 1946 to 1967, she was president of the Austrian association for the promotion of physical and chemical education. In this function she organised in-service training weeks for teachers, notably an international event in 1960.

Having been educated in music, her research initially focused on acoustics before she turned to ultrasound, X-ray crystallography, acousto-optics, and piezoelectricity of crystals. She also invented and patented a diaphragm-less crystal telephone. Her work on ultrasound contributed to today's applications in medicine and ultrasonic testing of materials.

For her work she was given the Decoration of Honour for Services to the Republic of Austria in 1968.

== Publications ==
- Seidl, Franziska: Über eine Messung kurzer Zeiten mit dem Helmholtz-Pendel ("About a measurement of short time intervals with the Helmholtz pendulum"), doctoral thesis, 1923.
- Seidl, Franziska: Untersuchungen am selbsttönenden Krystall ("Investigations on the self-sounding crystal"), 1926.
- Seidl, Franziska: Adsorptionspotential und Phasengrenzpotential schwer angreifbarer Gläser ("Adsorption potential and phase boundary potential of inert glasses"), 1931.
- Seidl, Franziska; Fröhlich, Helene; Hofer, Elisabeth: Über die Einwirkung von Radium- und Röntgenstrahlen auf Piezoquarze ("On the effect of radium- and X-rays on piezoelectric crystals"), 1933.
- Seidl, Franziska; Petritsch, Pia: Elektrische Leitfähigkeit der erstarrten Schmelze von Seignettesalzkrystalle ("Electrical conductivity of the solidified melt of Seignette salt crystals"), 1936.
