= Eppingen (electoral district) =

State electoral district of Germany

19: Eppingen
- Electoral district for the Landtag of Baden-Württemberg
- Heilbronn in 2026
- District: Heilbronn
- Electorate: 108,321 (2026)
- Major settlements: Abstatt, Bad Rappenau, Beilstein, Brackenheim, Cleebronn, Eppingen, Gemmingen, Güglingen, Ilsfeld, Kirchardt, Lauffen am Neckar, Massenbachhausen, Neckarwestheim, Pfaffenhofen, Schwaigern, Siegelsbach, Untergruppenbach, and Zaberfeld

Current electoral district
- Party: CDU
- Member: Michael Preusch

Eppingen is an electoral constituency (German: Wahlkreis) represented in the Landtag of Baden-Württemberg. Since 2026, it has elected one member via first-past-the-post voting. Voters cast a second vote under which additional seats are allocated proportionally state-wide. Under the constituency numbering system, it is designated as constituency 19. It is wholly within the district of Heilbronn.

== Geography ==
The constituency includes the municipalities of Abstatt, Bad Rappenau, Beilstein, Brackenheim, Cleebronn, Eppingen, Gemmingen, Güglingen, Ilsfeld, Kirchardt, Lauffen am Neckar, Massenbachhausen, Neckarwestheim, Pfaffenhofen, Schwaigern, Siegelsbach, Untergruppenbach, and Zaberfeld, within the district of Heilbronn.

There were 108,321 eligible voters in 2026.

== Members ==
=== First mandate ===
Both prior to and since the electoral reforms for the 2026 election, the winner of the plurality of the vote (first-past-the-post) in every constituency won the first mandate.

Election	Member	Party	%
1976	Gotthilf Link	CDU	
1980	Gotthilf Link	CDU	
1984	Gotthilf Link	CDU	
1988	Gerd Zimmermann	CDU	
1992	Gerd Zimmermann	CDU	
1996	Gerd Zimmermann	CDU	
2001	Friedlinde Gurr-Hirsch	CDU	41.6
2006	Friedlinde Gurr-Hirsch	CDU	44.3
2011	Friedlinde Gurr-Hirsch	CDU	40.9
2016	Friedlinde Gurr-Hirsch	CDU	26.6
2021	Erwin Köhler	Grüne	26.3
2026	Michael Preusch	CDU	35.3

=== Second mandate ===
Prior to the electoral reforms for the 2026 election, the seats in the state parliament were allocated proportionately amongst parties which received more than 5% of valid votes across the state. The seats that were won proportionally for parties that did not win as many first mandates as seats they were entitled to, were allocated to their candidates which received the highest proportion of the vote in their respective constituencies. This meant that following some elections, a constituency would have one or more members elected under a second mandate.

Prior to 2011, these second mandates were allocated to the party candidates who got the greatest number of votes, whilst from 2011-2021, these were allocated according to percentage share of the vote.

Prior to 1984, there were no second mandate candidates elected from this constituency.

Election	Member	Party	Member	Party	Member	Party
1984	Wolfgang Bebber	SPD				
1988	Wolfgang Bebber	SPD				
1992	Wolfgang Bebber	SPD	Richard Drautz	FDP	Michael Herbricht	REP
1996	Wolfgang Bebber	SPD	Richard Drautz	FDP	Michael Herbricht	REP
2001	Wolfgang Bebber	SPD				
May 2003	Ingo Rust	SPD				
2006	Ingo Rust	SPD				
2011	Ingo Rust	SPD				
Feb 2015	Hans Heribert Blättgen	SPD				
2016	Thomas Axel Palka	AfD				
2021	Rainer Podeswa	AfD	Georg Heitlinger	FDP	Michael Preusch	CDU
Sep 2023	Dennis Klecker	AfD	Georg Heitlinger	FDP	Michael Preusch	CDU

== Election results ==
=== 2026 election ===
State election (2026): Eppingen
Notes:	Blue background denotes the winner of the electorate vote. Pink background denotes a candidate elected from their party list. Yellow background denotes an electorate win by a list member, or other incumbent. A ✓ or ✗ denotes status of any incumbent, win or lose respectively.						
Party	Candidate	Votes	%	±%	Party votes	%	±%
CDU	Michael Preusch	26,814	35.3	▲10.8	22,735	29.8	▲5.4
AfD	Dennis Klecker	19,493	25.6	▲11.9	19,357	25.4	▲11.7
Greens	✗ Erwin Köhler	14,676	19.3	▼7.0	18,023	23.7	▼2.7
SPD	Bettina Fischer	5,442	7.2	▼4.0	4,132	5.4	▼5.7
FDP	Georg Heitlinger	5,070	6.7	▼6.8	3,986	5.2	▼8.2
Left	Emma Weber	2,826	3.7	▲1.1	2,180	2.9	▲0.3
FW					1,540	2.0	▼1.1
BSW					1,017	1.3	
APT					718	0.9	
Volt					531	0.7	
dieBasis					389	0.5	▼0.6
PARTEI					357	0.5	▼1.4
ÖDP	Carina Menakker	1,086	1.4	▲0.2	337	0.4	▼0.8
Values	Horst Rothenhöfer	330	0.4		221	0.3	
Bündis Deutschland	Jochen Holzmann	265	0.3				
Bündnis C					236	0.3	
Pensioners					169	0.2	
Team Todenhöfer					102	0.1	
Verjüngungsforschung					52	0.1	
PdF					52	0.1	
KlimalisteBW					36	0.0	
Humanists					35	0.0	
Informal votes		695			492		
Total valid votes		76,002			76,205		
Turnout		76,697	70.8	▲5.4			
CDU gain from Greens	Majority	7,321	9.7				

=== 2021 election ===
State election (2026): Eppingen
Party	Candidate	Votes	%	±%
Greens	Erwin Köhler	18,109	26.3	▲0.2
CDU	Michael Preusch	16,824	24.5	▼2.1
AfD	Rainer Podeswa	9,434	13.7	▼4.6
FDP	Georg Heitlinger	9,252	13.4	▲3.8
SPD	Jens Schäfer	7,665	11.1	▼2.3
FW	Jan Rittaler	2,123	3.1	
Left	Emma Weber	1,790	2.6	▲0.5
PARTEI	Milena Götz	1,267	1.8	
ÖDP	Klaus Ries-Müller	845	1.2	Steady
dieBasis	Mathias Haag	753	1.1	
WiR2020	Jürgen Wilbo	729	1.1	
Majority		1,285	1.8	
Rejected ballots		575	0.8	▼0.3
Turnout		69,366	65.4	▼6.6
Registered electors		105,990		
Greens gain from CDU		Swing		

== See also ==
- Politics of Baden-Württemberg
- Landtag of Baden-Württemberg
