= Fiberforge =

Rocky Mountain Institute's for-profit spin-off, originally Hypercar Inc., closed in 2013

- Formerly: Hypercar Inc.
- Company type: Privately held company
- Industry: Transport industry
- Founded: 1998
- Defunct: June 2013
- Fate: Liquidated
- Successor: Dieffenbacher
- Headquarters: Basalt, Colorado, United States
- Key people: Amory Lovins (Chairman)
- Products: Composites components, thermoplastic car components
- Number of employees: 70 (2012)

Fiberforge was an American privately held company that used a proprietary process for making thermoplastic advanced composites to make things more lightweight. Particular interest has been placed on decreasing weight of everyday means of transportation like cars and aircraft for better fuel efficiency and hence Environmental sustainability. Amory Lovins was its chairman emeritus.

The company was started in 1998 and ceased operations in June 2013 due to financial problems and attempted to liquidate its assets for the benefit of creditors It was later acquired by Dieffenbacher.

== History ==
- 1994: Rocky Mountain Institute founded the Hypercar Center to help prove its technical feasibility and commercial reality.
- 1998: Rocky Mountain Institute took this process a step further by launching a for-profit venture, Hypercar Inc.
- 2004: Hypercar Inc. changed its name to Fiberforge to better reflect the company's new goal of lowering the cost of high-volume advanced-composite structures/
- 2010: Office is established in Zug Switzerland.
- 2012: At the height of production, output with approximately 70 employees.
- 2013: Ceases operations due to financial problems. Acquired by Dieffenbacher.

== See also ==
- Amory Lovins
- Hypercar
- Rocky Mountain Institute
