= Ingo Rust =

German politician (born 1978)

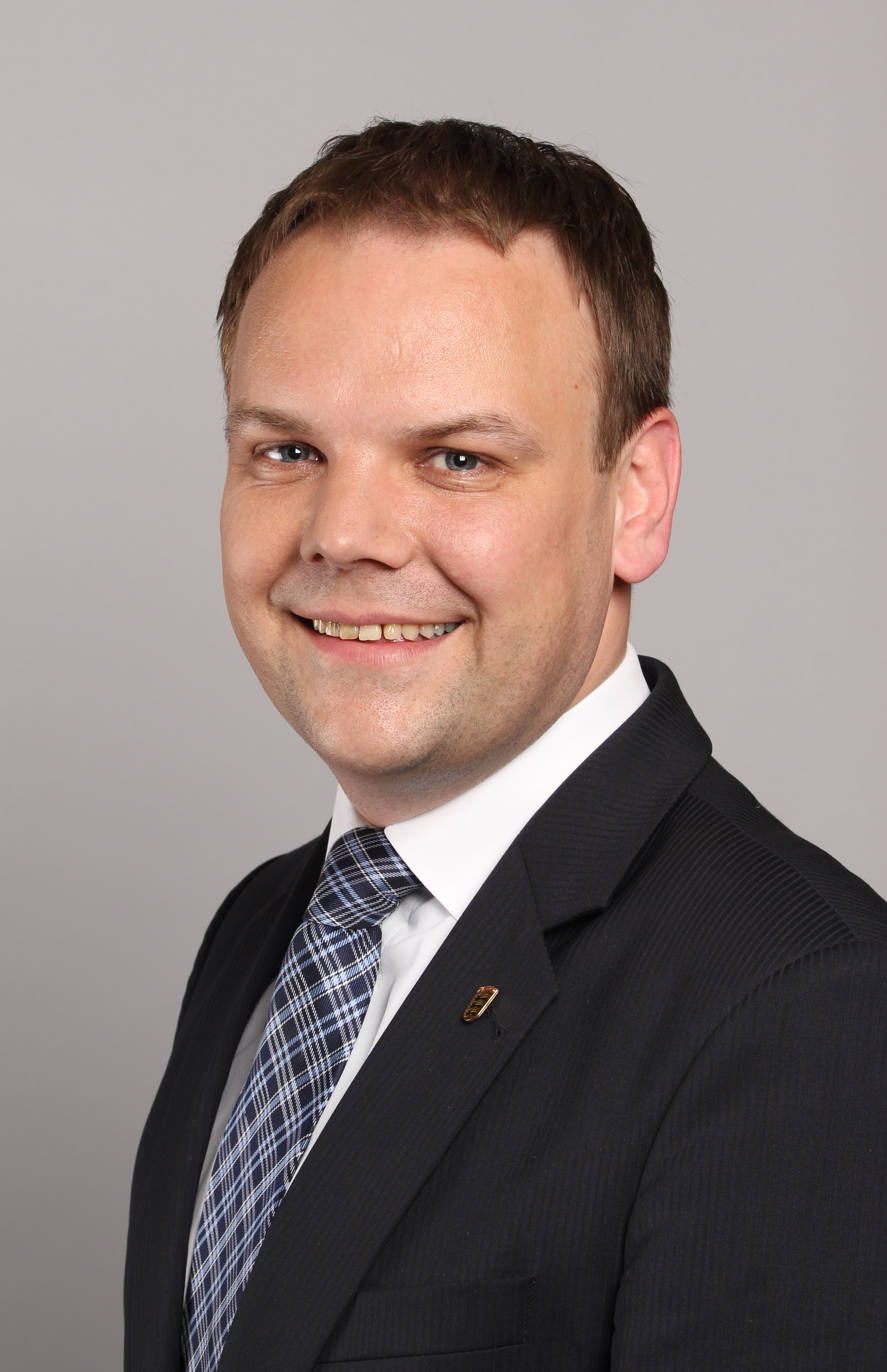
- Rust in 2013

Member of the Landtag of Baden-Württemberg
- In office 1 May 2003 – 31 January 2015
- Preceded by: Wolfgang Bebber
- Succeeded by: Hans Heribert Blättgen
- Constituency: Eppingen

Personal details
- Born: 17 January 1978 (age 48) Heilbronn
- Party: Social Democratic Party (since 1996)

Ingo Andreas Rust (born 17 January 1978 in Heilbronn) is a German politician. From 2003 to 2015, he was a member of the Landtag of Baden-Württemberg. From 2011 to 2015, he served as state secretary of finance and economy of Baden-Württemberg.
