= Michael Preusch =

German politician (born 1975)

Member of the Landtag of Baden-Württemberg
- Incumbent
- Assumed office 1 May 2021
- Constituency: Eppingen

Personal details
- Born: 13 December 1975 (age 50)
- Party: Christian Democratic Union (since 1993)

Michael Rainer Preusch (born 13 December 1975) is a German politician serving as a member of the Landtag of Baden-Württemberg since 2021. From 2012 to 2023, he served as chairman of the Christian Democratic Union in Eppingen.
