= Erwin Köhler =

German politician (born 1995)

Member of the Landtag of Baden-Württemberg
- Incumbent
- Assumed office 11 May 2021
- Constituency: Eppingen

Personal details
- Born: 6 June 1995 (age 30) Heilbronn
- Party: Alliance 90/The Greens

Erwin Köhler (born 6 June 1995 in Heilbronn) is a German politician serving as a member of the Landtag of Baden-Württemberg since 2021. He has been a municipal councillor of Lauffen am Neckar since 2014.
