= Güglingen =

- Town
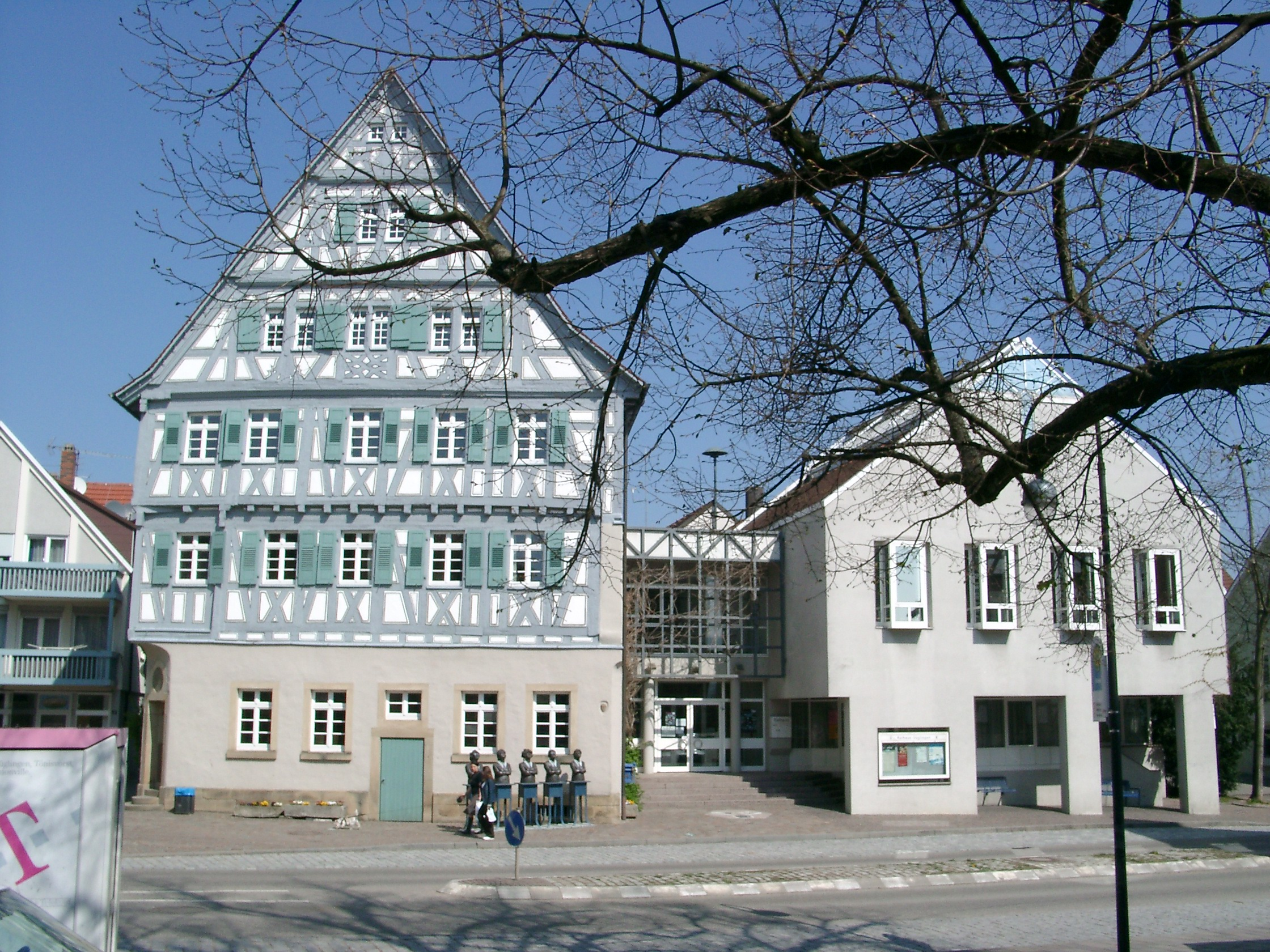
- Town hall

- Coat of arms

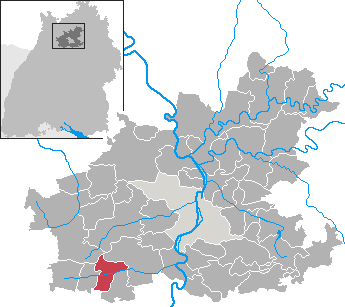
- Location of Güglingen within Heilbronn district
- Interactive map of Güglingen
- Location within Germany Location within Baden-Württemberg
- Coordinates: 49°4′N 9°0′E
- Country: Germany
- State: Baden-Württemberg
- Admin. region: Stuttgart
- District: Heilbronn
- Municipal assoc.: Oberes Zabergäu
- Subdivisions: 3

Government
  - Mayor (2017–25): Ulrich Heckmann

Area
  - Total: 16.26 km^{2} (6.28 sq mi)
- Elevation: 206 m (676 ft)

Population (2025-12-31)
  - Total: 6,344
  - Density: 390.2/km^{2} (1,011/sq mi)
- Time zone: UTC+01:00 (CET)
  - Summer (DST): UTC+02:00 (CEST)
- Postal codes: 74363
- Dialling codes: 07135
- Vehicle registration: HN
- Website: www.gueglingen.de

Güglingen (German: [ˈɡyːɡlɪŋən]) is a town in the district of Heilbronn in Baden-Württemberg in southern Germany. It is situated 18 km southwest of Heilbronn.

== Geography ==
Güglingen is situated in a valley called Zabergäu in the southwest district of Heilbronn.

=== Neighbouring municipalities ===
Neighbouring towns and municipalities (clockwise): Pfaffenhofen, Eppingen, Brackenheim, Cleebronn (all of the district of Heilbronn) and Sachsenheim (Ludwigsburg (district)).

=== Town structure ===
The town Güglingen consists of Güglingen itself (4254 inhabitants), with its subdivisions Eibensbach (1035) and Frauenzimmern (922). Total: 6211 (June 30, 2005).

== History ==
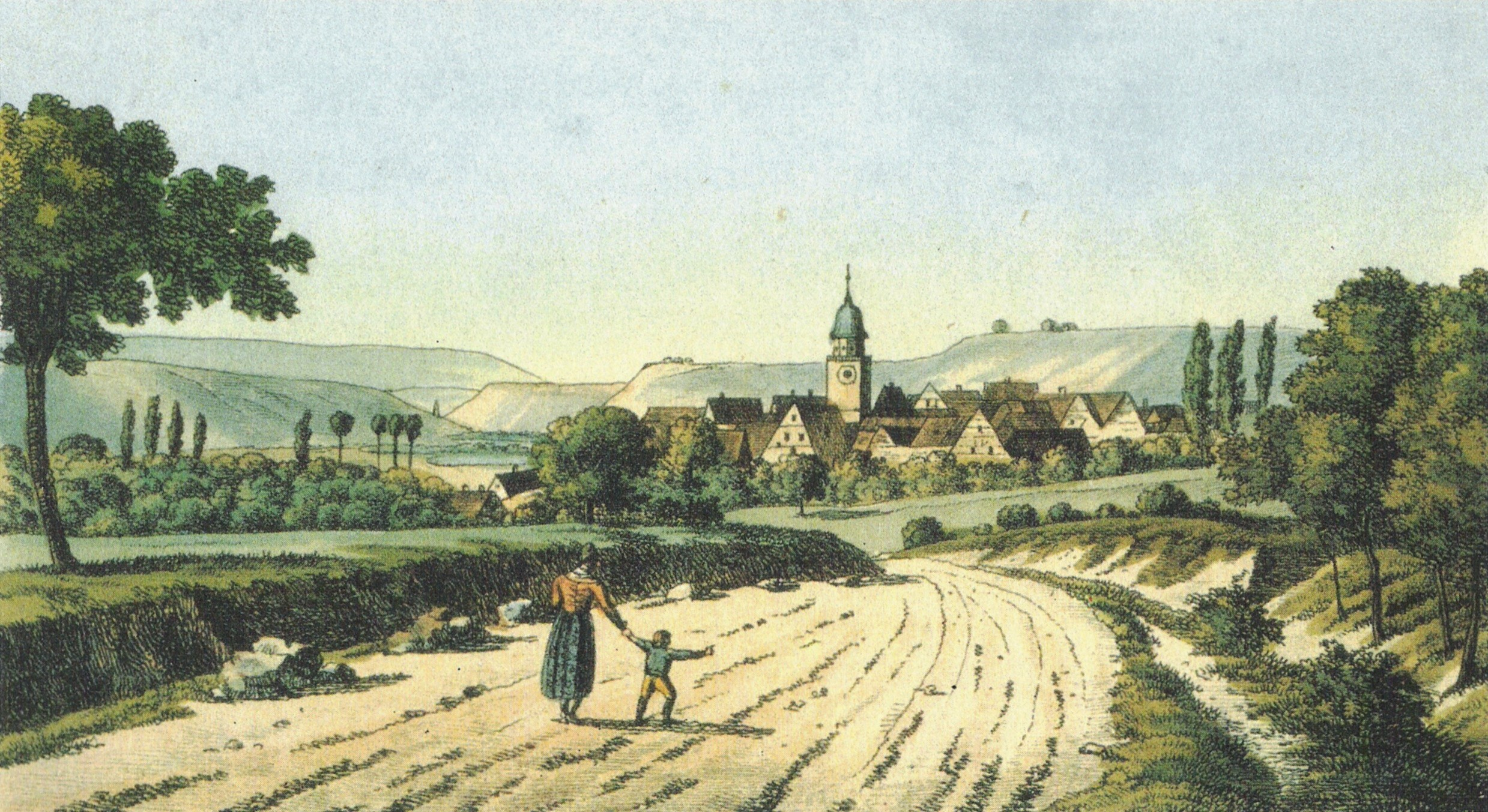
Güglingen from east, about 1820

In the Stone Age the communal land of Güglingen was settled in the time of the Romans and Celts. In 2002, two Mithras sanctuaries have been discovered and dug up. By the previous finds it is guessed that the Roman settlement had a surface of 10 hectare.

The village Güglingen was probably founded in the 4th or 5th century and was mentioned documentary in 1188 by a document of emperor Frederick Barbarossa for the first time. In 1295 at the latest the village received town rights. In the early 14th century the town changed to Württemberg. During the German Peasants' War 1525 it was the centre of the rebellion in the Zabergäu. Several fires about 1850 brought about destruction. After World War II the previous agricultural town changed into a trade and industry site.

The history of Eibensbach is closely connected with the castle Blankenhorn built 1220 in the south of the village. Already in the 17th century the castle just was a ruin. During the Hohenstaufen the village belonged to this castle. Until 1808 the village belonged to the department Güglingen, after it was independent and was incorporated to the town Güglingen on January 1, 1975.

Frauenzimmern was first mentioned documentary as Cimbern on December 19, 794. The name of this village goes back to the convent Marienthal existing from 1245 until 1442. Frauenzimmern was incorporated to Güglingen on July 1, 1971.

=== Religions ===
Each in Güglingen, Eibensbach and Frauenzimmern there is a Protestant parish. The Catholic parish Holy Trinity Güglingen is not only responsible for the town itself but also for the municipalities Pfaffenhofen, Zaberfeld and Cleebronn. In Güglingen there is also a United Methodist Church and New Apostolic Church.

== Politics ==
=== District council ===
After the municipal election on June 13, 2004, the district council of Güglingen has 20 seats and consists of:

- Freie Unabhängige Wählervereinigung FUW (12 seats)
- Bürger-Union BU (6 seats)
- Neue Liste NL (2 seats)

Further member of the district council and its chairman is the mayor.

=== Coat of arms ===
In red a silver gugel. The town colours are white and blue. The gugel as a talking arms figure is ascertainable in all seals of Güglingen since 1359. The arms colours stayed unchanged since 1575.

Güglingen

Eibensbach

Frauenzimmern

=== Town partnerships ===
Currently (December 2005), partnerships with Dorking, United Kingdom and Auneau, France are in preparation.

== Culture and sights ==
The Mauritiuskirche in Güglingen was first mentioned in 1241, was burned down by the fire 1849 and was rebuilt in 1850. The old department hall, since 1349 timber framing, is currently used as the town hall.

The Blankenhorn Castle situated above Eibensbach was built in 1220 and first mentioned in 1241. The Marienkirche of Eibensbach was built in the 14th century, the Martinskirche in Frauenzimmern about 1200.

== Economy ==
Güglingen is the main site company Afriso-Euro-Index GmbH, one of the leading German producers of measure, adjust and supervision gadgets for heating technology, industry and environmental protection. A further significant employer in Güglingen is the company Weber Hydraulik GmbH. "Eugen Lägler GmbH" world market leader for wood floor sanding machines, selling in more than 142 countries worldwide.

In the district Eibensbach is headquarters of one of the most significant producer of scaffoldings, the W. Layher GmbH & Co. KG.

=== Education ===
The elementary and secondary school Katharina-Kepler-Schule is attended by nearly 750 students, more than 900 students attend the secondary modern school in Güglingen. The library, which is open to the public, provides more than 16,000 items of media.
