= Rohrbach am Gießhübel =

- Stadtteil of Eppingen
- Coat of arms
- Interactive map of Rohrbach am Gießhübel
- Location within Germany Location within Baden-Württemberg
- Coordinates: 49°8′24″N 8°51′18″E
- Country: Germany
- State: Baden-Württemberg
- District: Heilbronn
- Town: Eppingen

Area
  - Total: 8.79 km^{2} (3.39 sq mi)
- Elevation: 203 m (666 ft)

Population (2011)
  - Total: 1,700
  - Density: 190/km^{2} (500/sq mi)
- Time zone: UTC+01:00 (CET)
  - Summer (DST): UTC+02:00 (CEST)

Rohrbach am Gießhübel is a village in the district of Heilbronn in Baden-Württemberg, Germany. Since 1 December 1971 it has been incorporated into Eppingen.
