= Zabergäu-Gymnasium Brackenheim =

Coordinates: 49°04′42″N 9°03′42″E

- Brackenheim, Baden-Württemberg; Germany

Information
- Type: Gymnasium (school)
- Faculty: 73
- Grades: 5–12
- Enrollment: 834
- Website: zagy.de/website
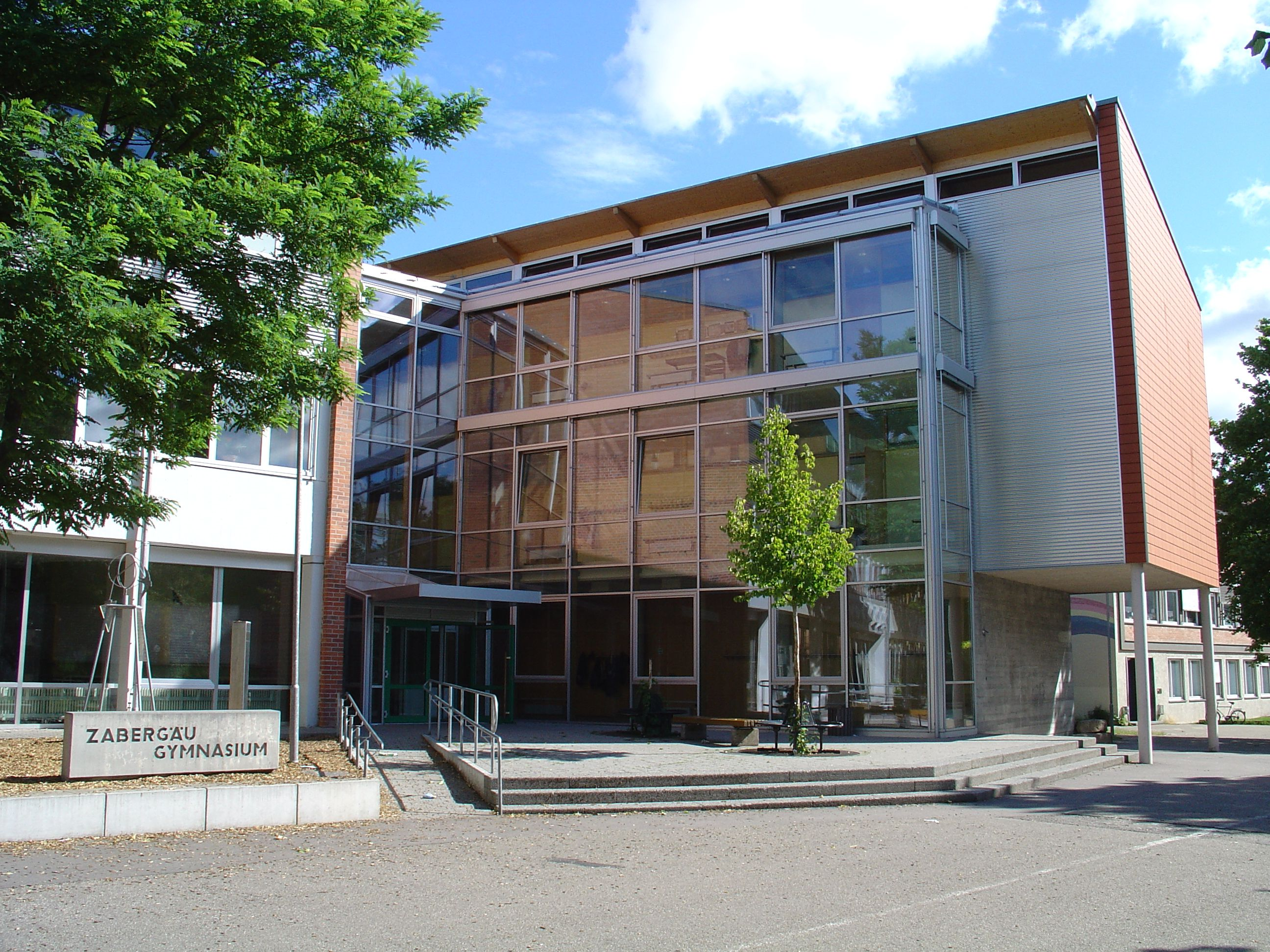

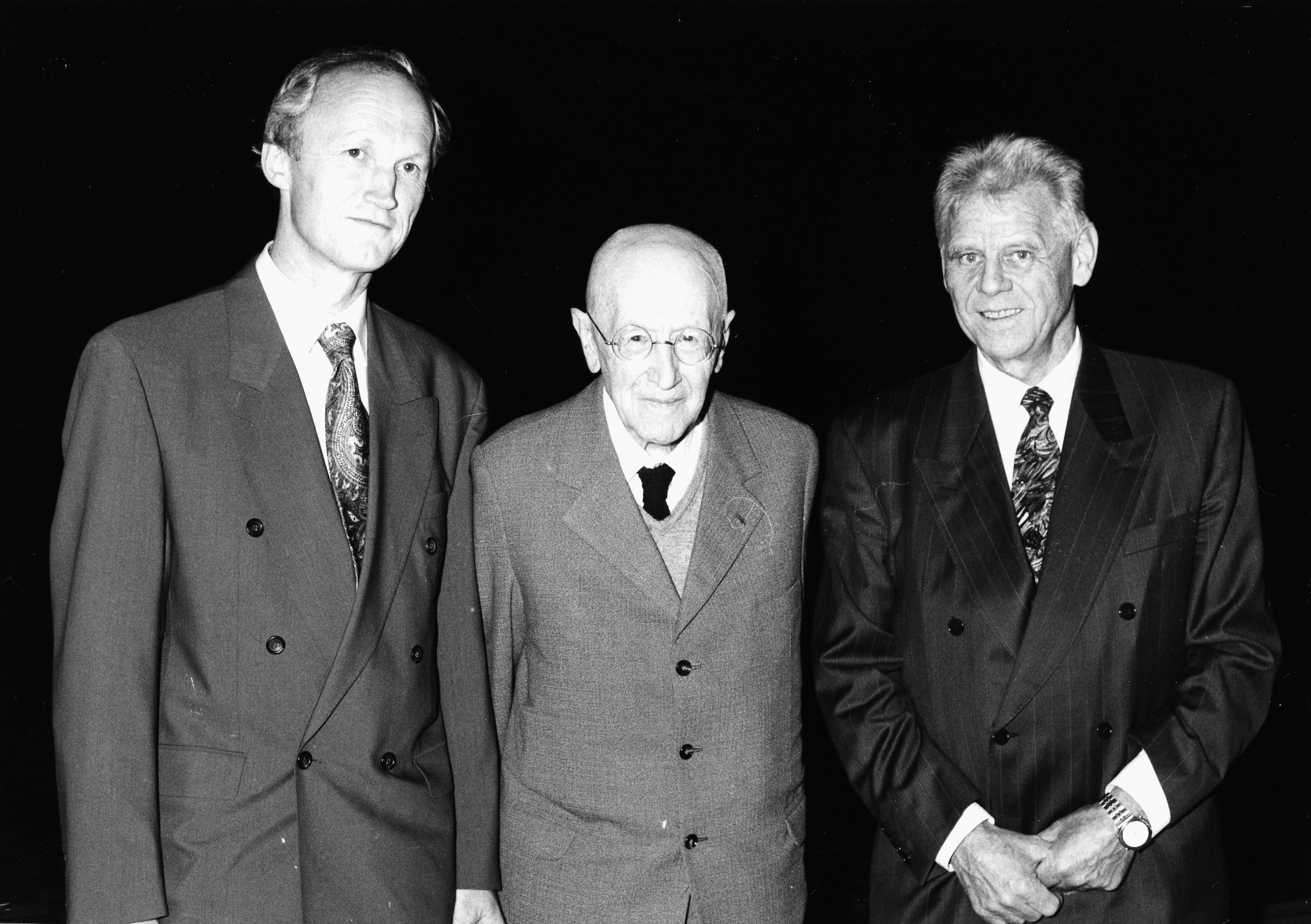
Three generations of headmasters: from left: Mr. Frey, Mr. Aßfahl, Mr. Oberhauser

The Zabergäu-Gymnasium Brackenheim (abbreviation: ZGB) is a general-education grammar school in Brackenheim, Germany. It is attended by about 1000 students from all over Zabergäu and its tradition goes back to the 15th century.

== History ==
The first reference of a school for town chroniclers in Brackenheim is dated to 1460. In 1503 the Town Clerk's office was separated from the grammar school and a certain Wendel Bender was named as the first schoolmaster in Brackenheim. Besides Latin classes with particular clerical commitments there were German classes, too. In these classes students were only taught in German. Since the Church Order by duke Christopher of Württemberg in the year 1559 the territorial lord (Landesherr) supervised the school, but the town held the authorisation to name the schoolmaster. This person had to be countersigned by the territorial lord. After 1560 an assistant teacher was mentioned beside the schoolmaster for the first time. About 1600 the construction of a new school building was started, which had been finished nine years later after a delay of building because of pest.

Under Magister (Latin: teacher) Johann Jakob Rappolt, who administered this office from 1747 to 1791, the Latin school was separated from the German classes prospectively called elementary school. Later these classes obtained their rooms. In 1793 the great school reform changed the orientation of the grammar school from interpretation of texts to "Realien" (arithmetic, geography, regional and cultural studies of fatherland). In 1834 another type of secondary school was established. But in 1851 it was closed again in default of students. In the first few years of its short existence the school was so popular that the number of Latin students temporarily sank to under ten (1842: only three students).

In the second half of the 19th century the grammar school was transformed into a high school with Latin as first, French as second and Greek as optional third foreign language as well as the subjects German, history, algebra, geography, arithmetic, grammar, drawing and singing. In 1863 physical education was introduced at school during summer months. In 1871 schoolgirls were listed at the school, although girls were not formally admitted to grammar schools until 1900. In 1877 a gym was built, so that physical education could be given year-round in the future.

In the years after 1900 Brackenheim's grammar school was repeatedly questioned. Before the First World War the transformation of the grammar school in a secondary school was discussed. In the 1920s the teachers' technical and vocational skills were criticed by a control commission. In 1930 the shutdown of the grammar school was suggested. This was firmly declined by the local council in the year 1936.

From 1937 the consistent curricular of the National Socialists changed the school's linguistic orientation: For the future English was the first and Latin the second foreign language. From then on the school was called "Oberschule für Jungen" (Grammar school for boys). This type of school was a so-called "Nichtvollanstalt", which means that girls were allowed to attend school, too. In the last years of war (1944/1945) the school enrollment number rose strongly because of many displaced families from the surrounding large cities.

After the war's end the building of the grammar school was used by French occupation troops, so that the bibliotheca of this institution was protected from depredations - in contrast to the public elementary school. Since 15 October 1945 the running of the school was started again with five grades (session 5 to 9). About 1950 the school was threatened to be closed again, because it wasn't expanded for the use of six grades, like other grammar schools.

In 1953/1954 a common building for the public elementary school and the grammar school was located. In 1963 a sixth grade was extended (10th session) to a so-called "Progymnasium". From 1964 to 1966 a new building for the "Progymnasium" was constructed. In 1968 about 168 pupils attended the school.

On 19 March 1971 Baden-Württemberg's ministry of education and cultural affairs granted the permission for the expansion to a so-called "Vollgymnasiums". In 1974/1975 the eleventh grade was introduced and in the following years grade 12 and 13, so that the first pupils did their A level in 1977. 1978 and 1983 more annex buildings followed.

In the year 2006 already 950 pupils attended the school. At the beginning of the school year 2006/2007 an addition was inducted. It contains new computer rooms, more class rooms and a few rooms for the use as a full-time school. This rooms are completed by a canteen in the neighboring building.

Dr. Gerhard Aßfahl (1904–2007), a well-known local history researcher and the head of Brackenheim's city archive, was a long-term headteacher from 1939 to 1968. Because he was given the freedom of the Zabergäu's five communes in 1989, there's a special prize called "Dr.-Gerhard-Aßfahl-Preis". Every school year this prize is given to pupils with extracurricular commitment.

== List of all headmasters ==
curatorship	name	curatorship	name
1460	Johannes Pfau		M. Hermann Friedrich Hopf
1501/02	Wendel Bender		M. Jeremias Friedrich Reuß
1529	Hans Doderer	1802–1805	M. Gottfried Ludwig Zenneck
nach 1530	Johann Schmidlin	1805–1811	M. Wilhelm Ludwig Christmann
1542–1550	Johann Wacker	1811–1819	M. Wilhelm Friedrich Mögling
1550–1552	Martin Rauber	1819–1831	M. Friedrich Heinrich Knauß
1559–1577	M. (=Magister/teacher) Georg Märklin	1831v1836	Dr. Gustav Friedrich Sigel
1511–1587	Michael Sattler	1837–1842	Johann Georg Leibfahrt
1587–1594	M. Johann Jakob Stehlin (Stählin)	1842–1852	Eduard Christoph Fürchtegott Adam
1594–1602	M. Berthold Höck	1852–1860	Karl Gottlieb Keller
1602–1607	M. David Weltz	1860–1868	Paul Speidel
1608–1620	M. Johann Schreitmüller	1869–1872	Hermann Ehemann
1621–1622	M. Christoph Lutz	1872	Dr. Hermann Nast
1622–1626	Johann Conrad Weltz	1873–1875	Adolf Seeger
1626–1635	Johann Bloß	1876–1881	Otto Christian Mayer
1635–1636	Hans Thomas Kästner	1881–1885	Heinrich Krockenberger
1636–1637	Georg Friedrich Krämer	1885–1887	Friedrich Raunecker
1637–1648	Johann Schweickhardt (Schweickart)	1887–1891	Robert Naser
1648–1660	Brechtold Krafft	1892	Dr. Karl Breinig
1660–1662	Johann Gabriel Werner	1892–1897	Hermann Zimmer
1662–1663	M. Gottfried Lang	1898–1906	Karl Bihl
1663–1670	Georg Petr. Stephani	1906–1911	Adolf Weber
1670–1679	M. Johann Michael Schnell	1911–1916	Dr. Erwin Herrmann
1679–-1684	M. Eberhard Friedrich Jenisch	1916–1918	Franz Betz und Alfons Schneiderhan
1684–1690	M. Johann Ulrich Fesenbeck	1918–1921	Dr. Paul Würthle
1690–1693	M. Johann Jakob Widmann	1921–1927	Hermann Mößner
1693–1709	Johann Jakob Ostermaier	1927–1931	Dr. Isidor Alber
1709–1717	M. David Böhm (Behm)	1931–1939	Walter Riethmüller
1718–1725	M. Johann Jakob Hammer (1717/18 as a vicar)	1939–1968	Dr. Gerhard Aßfahl
1725–1737	M. Johann Adam Zimmermann	1968–1993	Rainer Oberhauser
1737–1747	M. Johann Gottfried Körner	1993–2012	Wolfgang Frey
1747–1791	M. Johann Jakob Rappolt	2013-2018	Wolfgang Dietrich
1791–1800	M. Johann Friedrich Breitschwerdt	since 2018	Michael Kugel
