= Oberes Zabergäu =

- Gemeindeverwaltungsverband
- Location of Oberes Zabergäu within Heilbronn district
- Interactive map of Oberes Zabergäu
- Location within Germany Location within Baden-Württemberg
- Coordinates: 49°04′N 9°00′E
- Country: Germany
- State: Baden-Württemberg
- Admin. region: Stuttgart
- District: Heilbronn
- Seat: Güglingen
- Subdivisions: 3 municipalities

Area
  - Total: 50.49 km^{2} (19.49 sq mi)

Population (2025-12-31)
  - Total: 13,076
  - Density: 259.0/km^{2} (670.8/sq mi)
- Time zone: UTC+01:00 (CET)
  - Summer (DST): UTC+02:00 (CEST)
- Website: www.gvvoz.de

Oberes Zabergäu is a Gemeindeverwaltungsverband in the district of Heilbronn in Baden-Württemberg, Germany. The seat of the Gemeindeverwaltungsverband is in Güglingen.

The Gemeindeverwaltungsverband Oberes Zabergäu consists of the following municipalities:

1. Güglingen
2. Pfaffenhofen
3. Zaberfeld
