= Franz Joseph Damian Junghanns =

German revolutionary

Franz Joseph Damian Junghanns (29 November 1800, in Stocksberg castle – 3 December 1875, in Baden-Baden) was a jurist and leader in the Baden Revolution of 1848.

Junghanns studied from 1819 to 1823 at the University of Heidelberg and University of Göttingen.

In 1846, he was elected to the 12th season of the Second Chamber of Baden state parliament. He wasn't reelected in the 13th season, but took the place of his elected brother in 1847 and served until 1848.

In May 1849 he took part in the Offenburg Assembly and the Baden uprising. He was part of the provisional national committee during this time. Junghanns also served in the provisional German parliament at this point.

After the revolution collapsed Junghanns took refuge in Elsass, Belgium, and Switzerland, while in 1850 he was sentenced in absence to nine years in prison. He returned to Baden in 1859. After this he practiced law at Bühl and Rastatt.

== Sources ==
- Michael Bock: Die badischen Landtagsabgeordneten aus dem Amtsbezirk Wiesloch 1819–1933, in: Wiesloch – Beiträge zur Geschichte Bd. 1, Ubstadt-Weiher 2000, pg. 152–155.
