= Brackenheim =

Town in Heilbronn

- Town
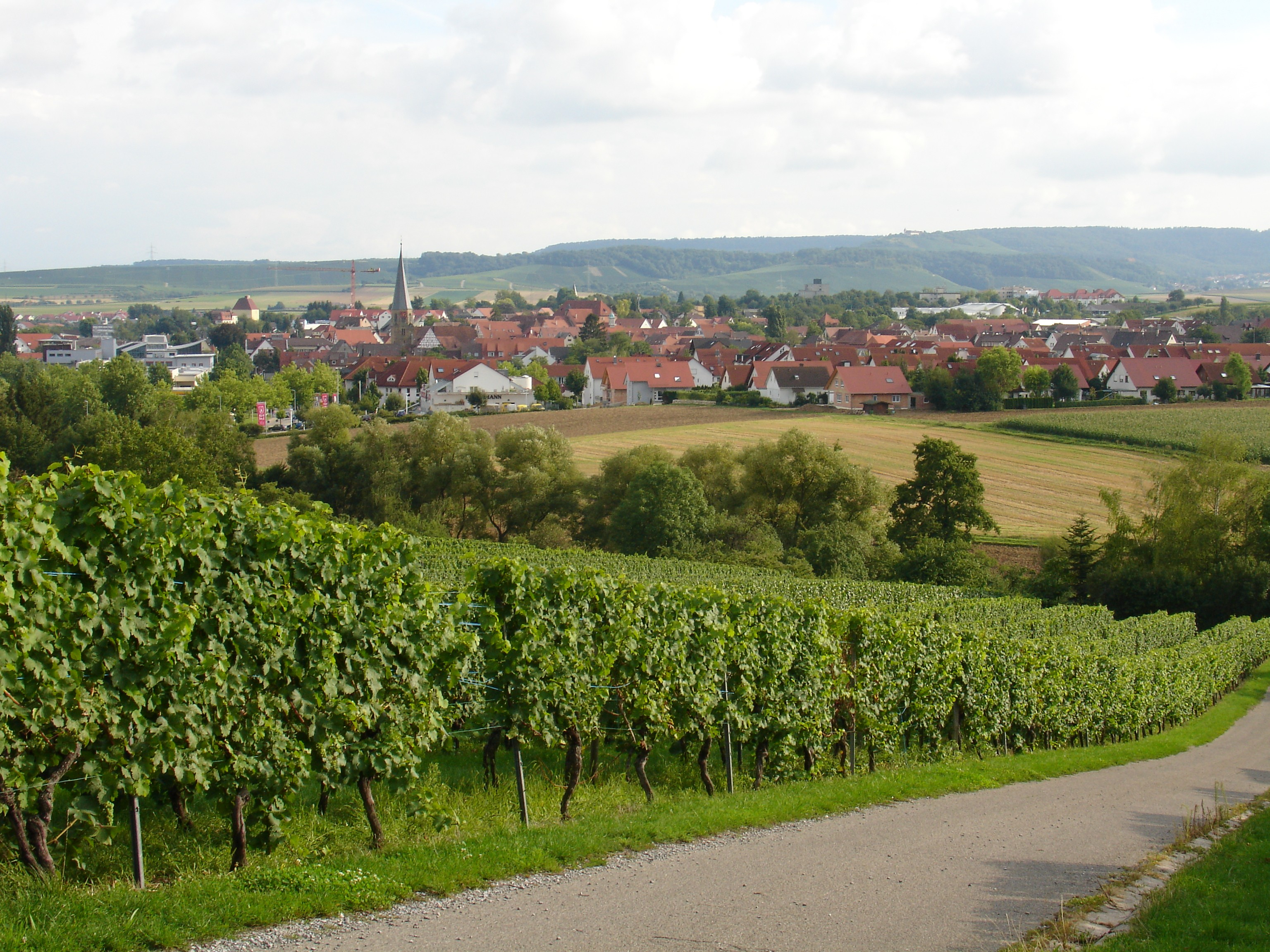

- Coat of arms

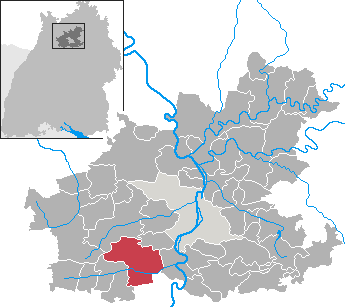
- Location of Brackenheim within Heilbronn district
- Interactive map of Brackenheim
- Location within Germany Location within Baden-Württemberg
- Coordinates: 49°5′N 9°4′E
- Country: Germany
- State: Baden-Württemberg
- Admin. region: Stuttgart
- District: Heilbronn
- Subdivisions: 8

Government
  - Mayor (2019–27): Thomas Csaszar

Area
  - Total: 45.75 km^{2} (17.66 sq mi)
- Elevation: 192 m (630 ft)

Population (2025-12-31)
  - Total: 16,712
  - Density: 365.3/km^{2} (946.1/sq mi)
- Time zone: UTC+01:00 (CET)
  - Summer (DST): UTC+02:00 (CEST)
- Postal codes: 74336
- Dialling codes: 07135
- Vehicle registration: HN
- Website: www.brackenheim.de

Logo of Brackenheim

Brackenheim (German pronunciation: [ˈbʁakŋ̍ˌhaɪm]) is a town in the Landkreis Heilbronn in Baden-Württemberg in southern Germany. It is 15 kilometres (9 mi) southwest of Heilbronn. With 826 hectares (2,040 acres) of vineyards, it is the biggest grape-growing municipality of Württemberg.

== Geography ==
=== Geographical position ===
Brackenheim is situated on the river Zaber in the Zabergäu in southwestern district of Heilbronn, in the north of Baden-Württemberg, Germany. The landscape is characterized by extensive vineyards.

=== Neighbouring municipalities ===
Neighbouring towns and municipalities (clockwise): Cleebronn, Güglingen, Eppingen, Schwaigern, Nordheim, Lauffen (Neckar) (all district of Heilbronn), Kirchheim (Neckar) and Bönnigheim (both Ludwigsburg (district)).

=== Town structure ===
Apart from Brackenheim itself, it consists of the following:

- Botenheim
- Dürrenzimmern
- Hausen an der Zaber
- Haberschlacht
- Meimsheim
- Neipperg
- Stockheim.

== History ==
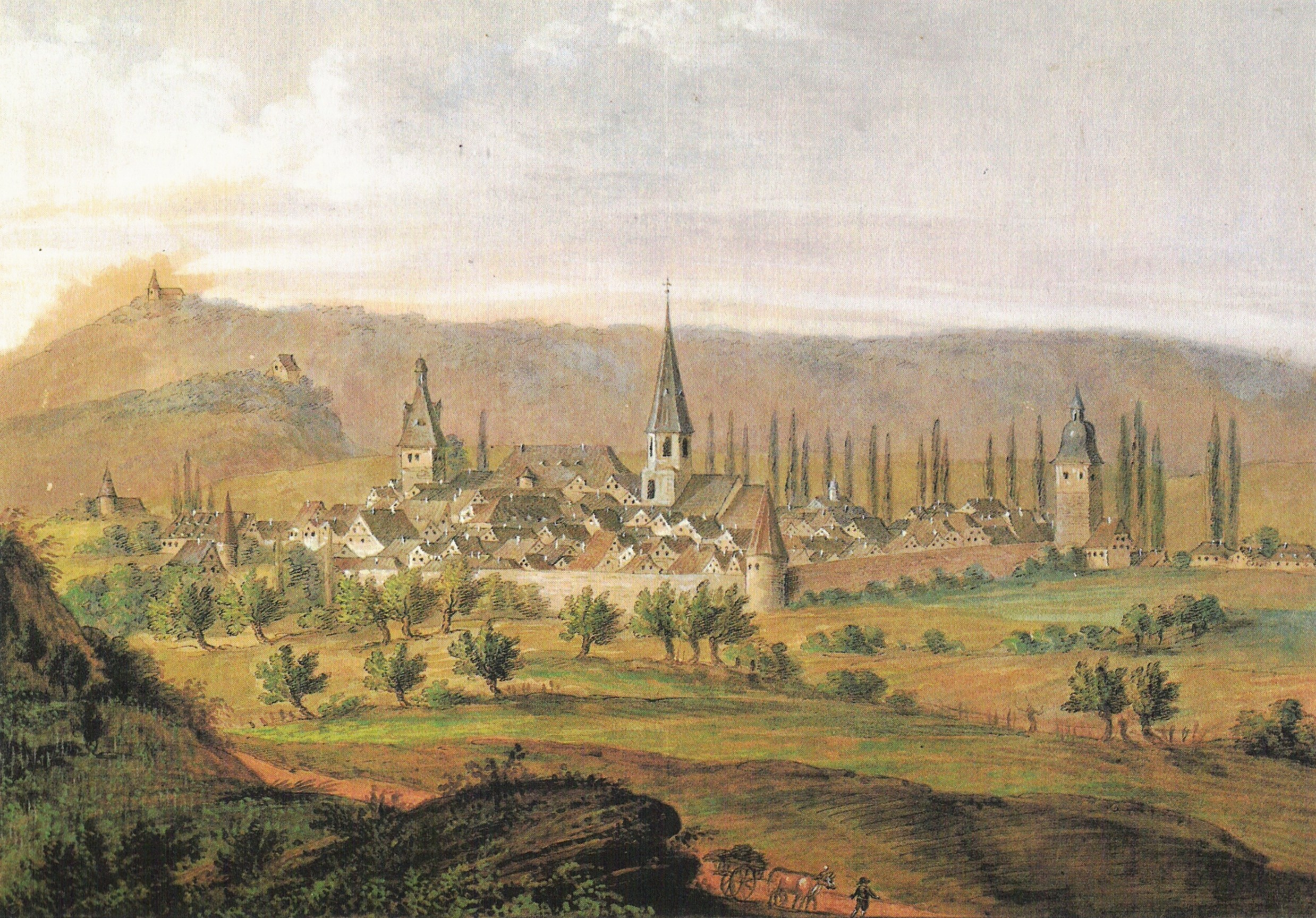
Brackenheim from north-east, author unknown, aquarell with pencil, about 1820

The communal land of Brackenheim has been settled for 5,000-6,000 years. Botenheim and Meimsheim were mentioned in the 12th century; Brackenheim was mentioned in 1246. Brackenheim received its town rights by King Rudolf I. von Habsburg in 1280. After a big fire in 1691 burning down 112 houses, the town had to be rebuilt in many places.

Owing to the communal reform from 1971 to 1974, the previous independent communities now representing districts were incorporated. The active construction of building has filled in the spaces previously between the districts and led to a huge increase of the population in Brackenheim. During 1995-2004 the town increased by about 2,700 inhabitants.

=== Religions ===
Brackenheim is the seat of Church District Brackenheim-Dürrenzimmern of the Evangelical-Lutheran Church in Württemberg. In Botenheim-Meimsheim, Hausen and Neipperg there are separate parishes of each of these districts. In Stockheim there is the Catholic Parish St. Ulrich, which also contains Haberschlacht and a district of Eppingen called Kleingartach. Neipperg belongs to the Parish St. Martinus in Schwaigern, the parish of Brackenheim contains the remaining districts. Both a free church and a Methodistic church is represented.

== Local council ==
Elections in May 2014:

| Party / List | Vote share | + / − | seats | + / − |
|---|---|---|---|---|
| CDU | 33.6 % | – 3.6 | 10 | − 1 |
| SPD | 15.9 % | – 3.5 | 5 | ± 0 |
| The Left | 2.0 % | + 2.0 | 1 | + 1 |
| Free voters Baden-Württemberg | 27.5 % | – 1.9 | 8 | − 1 |
| List 21 | 21.0 % | + 7.0 | 6 | + 2 |
| Total | 100% | | 30 | |
Poll: 49.5 % (− 2.4)

=== Arms ===
In red a silver hound with a black collar. The municipality colours are white and red.

Even the oldest preserved seal of the 13th century shows a hound. In the course of the centuries, the dog was employed in different positions - standing, striding, jumping and so on - and with different extras like a collar or a necklace. In 1953, the arms were laid down in the current form by the district council.

=== Town twinnings ===
- 1962: The contemporary district Neipperg concluded a partnership with the French municipality Marsan (département Gers).
- 1978: Brackenheim concluded a partnership with the French town Charnay-lés-Mâcon (département Saône-et-Loire).
- 1996: The town concluded a further partnership with the Italian municipality Castagnole delle Lanze (Province Asti).
- 2001: The town concluded a friendship treaty with the Polish municipality Zbrosławice (Voivodship Upper Silesia).

Besides there are friendly relationships with Le Lude (France) and Port Talbot (Wales).

== Culture and sights ==
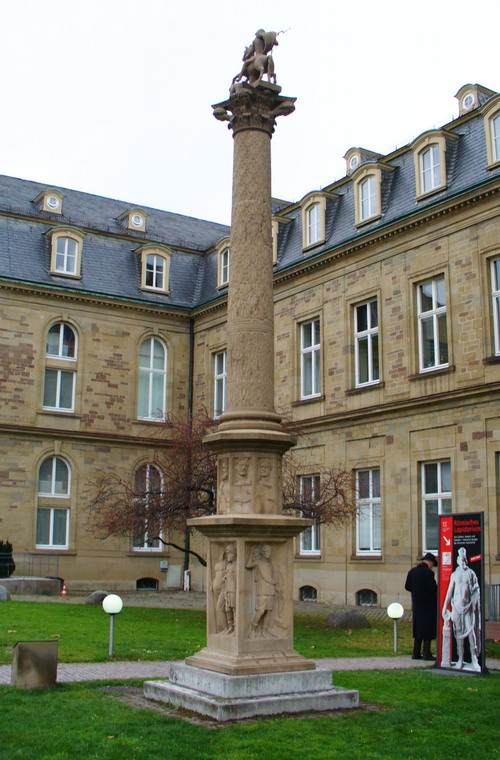
Jupiter statue

By the chapel in the castle, the association Kulturforum Brackenheim e. V. has its own scene with 200 seats for its disposal since 1994. It's employed to show concert, cabaret and theatre games.

=== Museums ===
The 1968 created urban Theodor-Heuss-Museum shows the life of Theodor Heuss, the considerable son of this town. There are also native country museums in Brackenheim and its district Botenheim.

=== Buildings ===
At the graveyard of Brackenheim stands the first parish church, today's Protestant Johanniskirche, a Romance church with Gothic choir contenting wall drawings of the 13th and 14th centuries. During the reformation the onetime Gothic Jakobus Chapel was held up to the town church, founded about 1200.

The Brackenheim Castle in the south of the old part of town was built 1556–59 instead of an old castle. After a fire, parts of the castle were rebuilt in 1677–85. In Botenheim there are the Gothic Marienkirche built 1350 and the Gülthaus of 1605. Dürrenzimmern shows its church of the 12th century and the onetime town hall of 1731. Apart from that there are many churches in the districts of Brackenheim, emphasizing the Stocksberg Castle of the 16th century near Stockheim.

=== Protection of nature ===
In Brackenheim there are the nature reserves Zaberauen (near Botenheim) and Haberschlachter Tal (near Dürrenzimmern and Haberschlacht).

== Economy and infrastructure ==
Grape-growing began in Brackenheim in the 14th century. Today (2008), Brackenheim is the largest grape-growing municipality of Württemberg, with many varieties being grown on 826 hectares (2,040 acres). Apart from three wine-cellars having 1,200 members there are more than 30 self-marketers taking care of their wine marketing for themselves.

=== Traffic ===
There are connections to the long-distance traffic in Lauffen (Neckar) (B27) and Schwaigern (B293). Public transport is ensured by buses. There are connections to the rail network in Lauffen (Neckar) and Schwaigern, too.

=== Institutions and court ===
In the urban hospital built in the 1960s there are 130 beds and 240 employees. The district court of Brackenheim with one judge is one of the smallest in Baden-Württemberg. Brackenheim also has a swim hall.

=== Education ===
The Theodor-Heuss-Schule is an elementary and secondary school. There are elementary schools in Botenheim, Dürrenzimmern, Hausen an der Zaber, Meimsheim, Neipperg and Stockheim as well. The Zabergäu-Gymnasium Brackenheim (grammar school) is visited by nearly 1,000 students from all over the Zabergäu. The urban library having more than 13,000 media is open to the public.

== Notable people ==
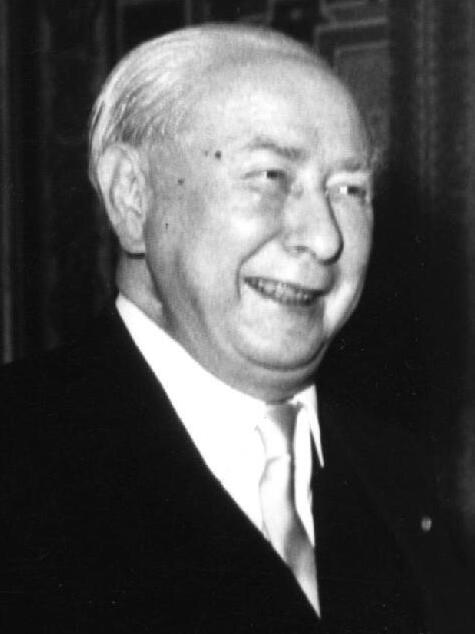
Theodor Heuss, 1957

- Franz Joseph Damian Junghanns (1800–1875), Jurist and leader in the Baden Revolution of 1848.
- Hermann Mögling (1811–1881), missionary to the state of Karnataka, India, where he published a newspaper.
- Henry Miller (1827–1916), a German-American cattle breeder and rancher
- Theodor Heuss (1884–1963), politician (DDP, FDP), Bundespräsident, from 1949 to 1959 and honorary citizen of Brackenheim

=== Sport ===
- Frank Höfle (born 1967), multiple Paralympic Games medal winner
- Markus Beierle (born 1972), footballer, played 407 games
- Marjan Petković (born 1979), footballer, played over 275 games
- Mara Alber (born 2005), footballer
