= Layher =

German scaffolding manufacturer

Layher Holding GmbH & Co. KG
- Company type: GmbH & Co. KG
- Founded: 1945
- Founder: Wilhelm Layher
- Headquarters: Güglingen (Baden-Württemberg), Germany
- Key people: Carolin Langer; Georg Layher
- Number of employees: 1,700
- Website: www.layher.com

Layher Holding GmbH & Co. KG is a globally leading German manufacturer of scaffolding, protective and event systems and ladders. The company operates three production facilities in Germany. The headquarters in Güglingen-Eibensbach produces steel scaffolding components, while the second plant in neighbouring Güglingen makes aluminium and wooden components. The newly completed third plant, the largest, also produces steel scaffolding components.

== History ==
The timber merchant Wilhelm Layher established the company in 1945 to make agricultural implements and ladders out of wood. As the German economy recovered, he identified the need for construction scaffolding, and by 1948 was already specializing in the production of ladder scaffolding. His daughter, Ruth Langer, and his two sons, Eberhard and Ulrich Layher, also worked in the company and successfully continued the business after the death of the founder in 1962. Under their management, Layher evolved into the biggest manufacturer of system scaffolding: with SpeedyScaf in 1965 and Allround Scaffolding in 1974, not only were the systems which are still standard today marketed, but also – starting in 1970 – the first steps towards internationalization were taken, with subsidiaries in the Netherlands, France and Switzerland.

In 1987, Eberhard Layher decided to retire for age and health reasons, selling his share to his brother and sister. Still 100 percent family-owned today, Layher now has subsidiaries in around 40 countries and partner companies all over the world. In Germany, operative business is handled by Wilhelm Layher GmbH & Co KG, managed by Wolf Christian Behrbohm and Stefan Stöcklein. The company has 30 service centres all over Germany, but does not itself offer any scaffolding construction services: instead it acts only as the manufacturer and supplier for customers from scaffolding, crafts, construction, industry and the events business. Its associate company – Layher Bautechnik GmbH based in Ulm – sells not only Layher scaffolding systems, but also construction equipment, construction machinery and warehouse equipment. Its managing director is Tobias Kächler.

== Products ==
The family owns 600 patents and protective rights worldwide. In 1965, the system scaffolding specialist designed, for example, the definitive insertion-frame system for facade scaffolding construction, with its SpeedyScaf made from steel and aluminium. In 1974, Allround Scaffolding superseded conventional scaffolding construction techniques, using steel tubes and couplers, with its bolt-free wedge-head connection technology. Layher presented its further innovation: By using higher-tensile steel grades, new production processes and design improvements, we have succeeded in minimising the weight of the basic components of our SpeedyScaf and Allround Scaffolding systems – without reducing their high load capacities. Assembly speed can be increased up to 10%, transport capacity up to 12%. Matching the scaffolding systems, there are also protective systems like temporary roofs and facade coverings for site protection and – based on a substructure using Allround equipment – the Event System for constructing temporary stages or stands. Access technology made of aluminium and wood is also part of the product range.

== Projects ==
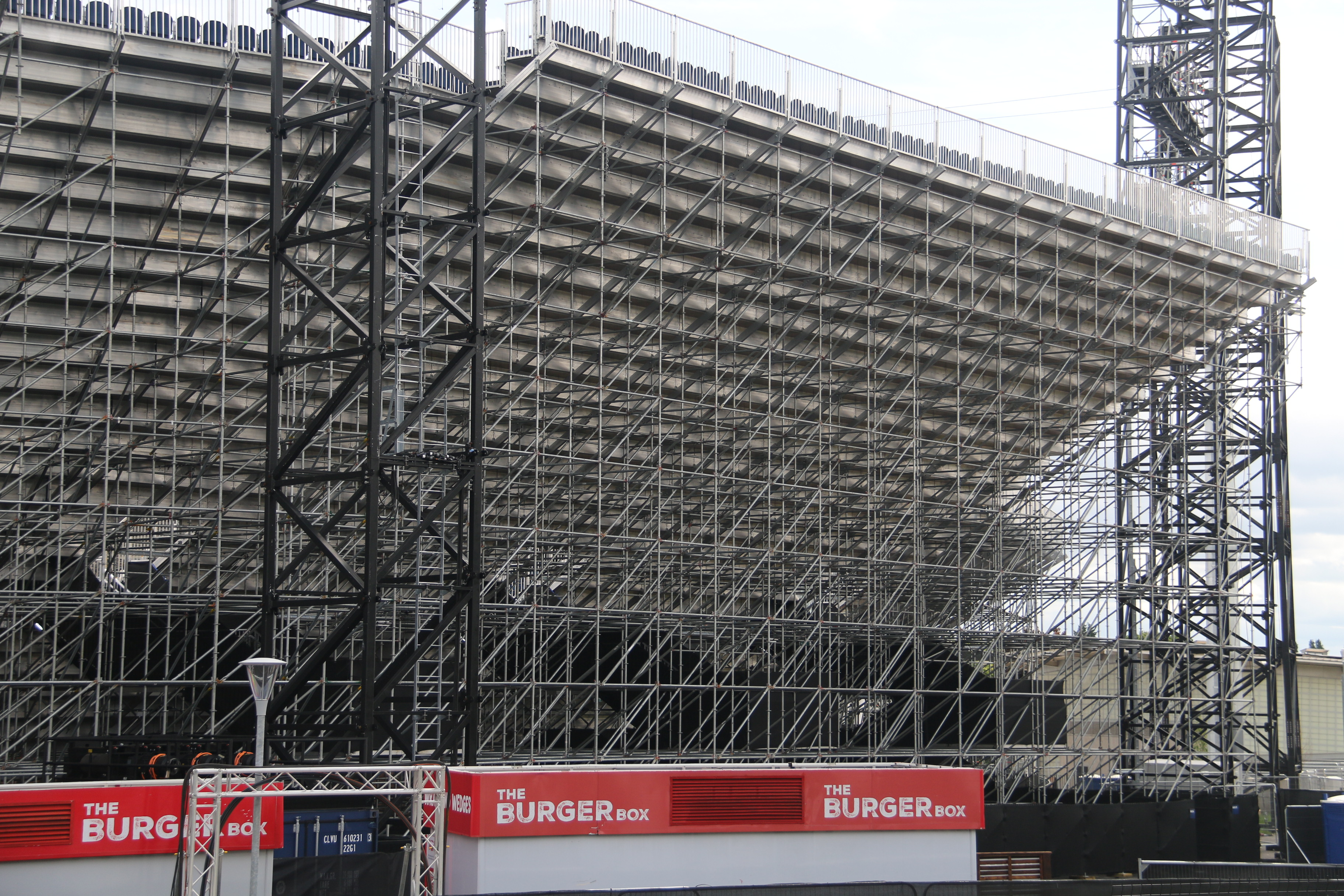
Layher Allround scaffolding in use to support seating stands at the Alexander Stadium in Birmingham ahead of the 2022 Commonwealth Games.

System scaffoldings are not only being used for work and protective scaffolding, but also for a variety of further tasks: for instance shoring, temporary access or site protection. Today Layher products are worldwide in use on sites, in the industry or in sports and cultural events. In 2009, for example, a 150-metre-long (490 ft) and 56-metre-high (184 ft) ski ramp was assembled in Moscow as a promotional event for the 2014 Winter Olympics using about 1,300 tons of Allround Scaffolding. For viewing the excavations in ancient Pompeii, a weather protection roof and a temporary pedestrian walkway were erected in 2010 using Allround Scaffolding. This modular system was also used a short time later for the Cannstatter Volksfest – not as a pedestrian walkway but as a 30-metre-wide (98 ft) escape stairway. The use of the Allround Bridging System in 2012 enabled the scaffolding for the stave church in Borgund, Norway. In 2013 followed the construction of a 600-square-meter Allround Shoring TG 60 structure for the pumped storage power station project “Linthal 2015” in Switzerland. Also high in the Swiss mountains, the SpeedyScaf ensured in 2014 the rapid assembly of a work scaffold at the “Hörnli Hut” below the Matterhorn, and the “Arup Building” of the University of Cambridge was temporarily roofed over using a 2,600-square-meter Keder Roof XL. Currently a 100,000-cubic-meter construction of Allround Scaffolding and Allround Scaffolding Lightweight ensures the restoration of the Adolphe Bridge in Luxembourg.

== Awards ==
- “Baden-Württemberg Competence Prize for Quality and Innovation” in 2011.
- Award from the then-Federal Environment Minister Peter Altmaier for energy efficiency in 2012.
- First prize of the Polish Chamber of Commerce for scaffolding in the category of “Safety and Technology” for its Safety Assembly P2 in 2013.
