= Pfaffenhofen, Baden-Württemberg =

Pfaffenhofen
- Municipality
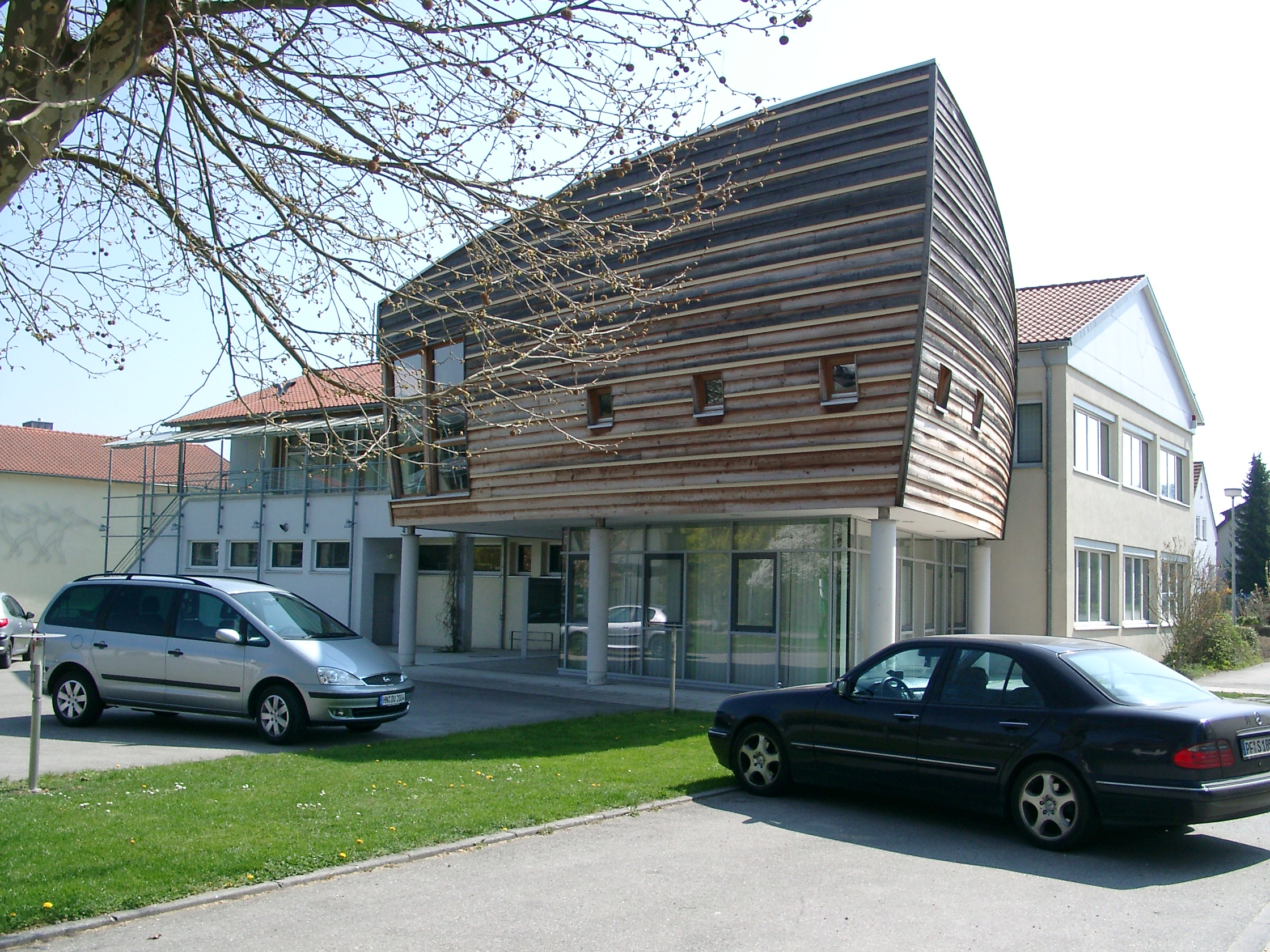
- New town hall

- Coat of arms

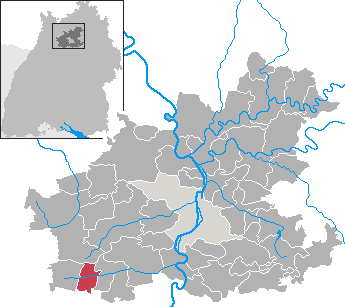
- Location of Pfaffenhofen within Heilbronn district
- Interactive map of Pfaffenhofen
- Location within Germany Location within Baden-Württemberg
- Coordinates: 49°4′N 8°58′E
- Country: Germany
- State: Baden-Württemberg
- Admin. region: Stuttgart
- District: Heilbronn
- Municipal assoc.: Oberes Zabergäu
- Subdivisions: 2

Government
  - Mayor (2021–29): Carmen Kieninger

Area
  - Total: 12.10 km^{2} (4.67 sq mi)
- Elevation: 206 m (676 ft)

Population (2025-12-31)
  - Total: 2,575
  - Density: 212.8/km^{2} (551.2/sq mi)
- Time zone: UTC+01:00 (CET)
  - Summer (DST): UTC+02:00 (CEST)
- Postal codes: 74397
- Dialling codes: 07046
- Vehicle registration: HN
- Website: www.pfaffenhofen-wuertt.de

Pfaffenhofen (German: [pfafn̩ˈhoːfn̩]) is a municipality in the district of Heilbronn in Baden-Württemberg in Germany.

== Geography ==
Pfaffenhofen is situated on the Zaber in the Zabergäu in the southwest of the district of Heilbronn.

=== Neighbouring municipalities ===
Neighbouring towns and municipalities of Pfaffenhofen are (clockwise from the west): Zaberfeld, Eppingen, Güglingen (all of the district of Heilbronn) and Sachsenheim (district of Ludwigsburg). Pfaffenhofen has combined with Güglingen and Zaberfeld to form a joint association of administrations called Oberes Zabergäu.

=== Municipal structure ===
Apart from the main village of Pfaffenhofen there's the municipal part Weiler an der Zaber. The hamlet Rodbachhof also belongs to Pfaffenhofen. The village Rodenbach which doesn't exist anymore was situated on the communal land of Pfaffenhofen.

== History ==
Pfaffenhofen was presumably founded in times of the Christianization of Germany. It was first mentioned documentary as Pfaffenhoven on May 30, 1279. Already before 1380 Burkhard von Hohenberg sold the half of the village to Württemberg, in 1380 the other half followed.

Weiler an der Zaber presumably already existed around 1000. It was first mentioned documentary on June 15, 1279. In the 14th century the village came to Württemberg. On January 1, 1972, Weiler an der Zaber was incorporated to Pfaffenhofen.

=== Religions ===
Pfaffenhofen previously belonged to the Speyer Bishopric. By the introduction of the reformation in Württemberg it got Protestant. The municipality is still shaped Protestant today, so in Pfaffenhofen and Weiler an der Zaber there's a Protestant parish in each village. The Catholic parish Holy Trinity Güglingen is responsible for Pfaffenhofen's Catholic citizens.

=== Development of population ===
- 1970: 1853
- 1980: 1914
- 1990: 2161
- 2000: 2342
- 2005: 2349

(each date of January 1)

== Politics ==
=== District council ===
The district council of Pfaffenhofen has 12 seats, 8 of Pfaffenhofen and 4 of Weiler. By the communal election of June 13, 2004, it has 13 seats due to an overhang seat. The mayor is also a member of the district council and its chairman.

=== Arms and flag ===
Arms of Pfaffenhofen

Blazon: In silver a priest's tonsure proper. The municipal colours are red and white.

The oldest known seal of Pfaffenhofen proved from 1482 to 1611 shows a human figure behind a fence: a talking arms, a priest (cleric) in a yard. Coloured portrayals of this arms are derived since 1535. A seal of 1678 showed two straightened up lions holding a disc.

At least in the 20th century the tonsure developed into a sun with face by misunderstandings. In 1956 the municipality took a priest tonsure as its arms again by suggestion of the archive directory. The arms was confirmed by the ministry of the interior on November 13, 1956, the flag was given by the district of Heilbronn on January 31, 1980.

== Culture and sights ==
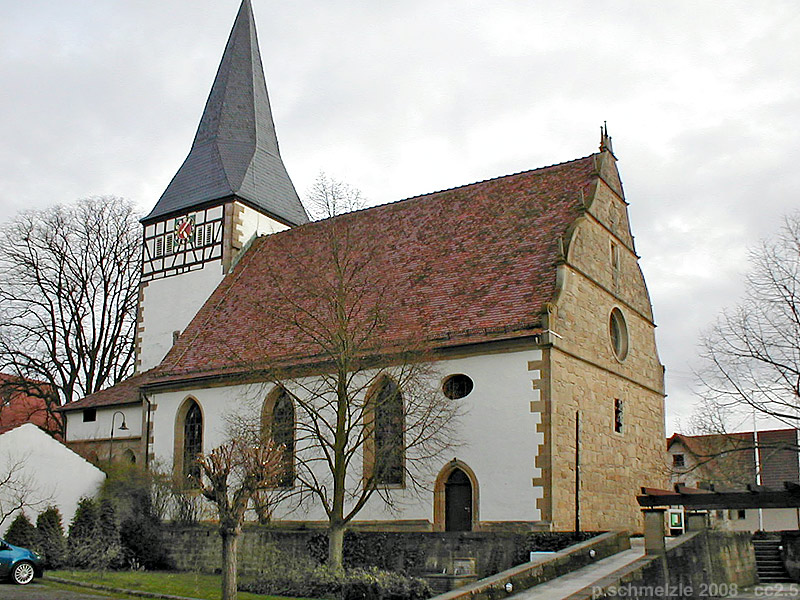
Lambertuskirche

=== Notable buildings ===
- the Lambertuskirche is a Protestant parish church. It goes back to a Gothic building with chancel tower from about 1300, was expanded multiply and got its most essential change by a rebuilding in 1610/12.
- The accompanying vicarage was built parallel to the church expansion in 1610 by Heinrich Schickhardt. The bricking of the vicarage garden goes back to parts of the village wall of the 15th century, which was pulled down almost completely in 1817.
- Both the fountain on the Kelterplatz and a wall fountain nearby were laid out by the sculptor Gunther Stilling.
- In the main street (Hauptstraße) there are several half-timbered buildings of the 16th and 17th century.
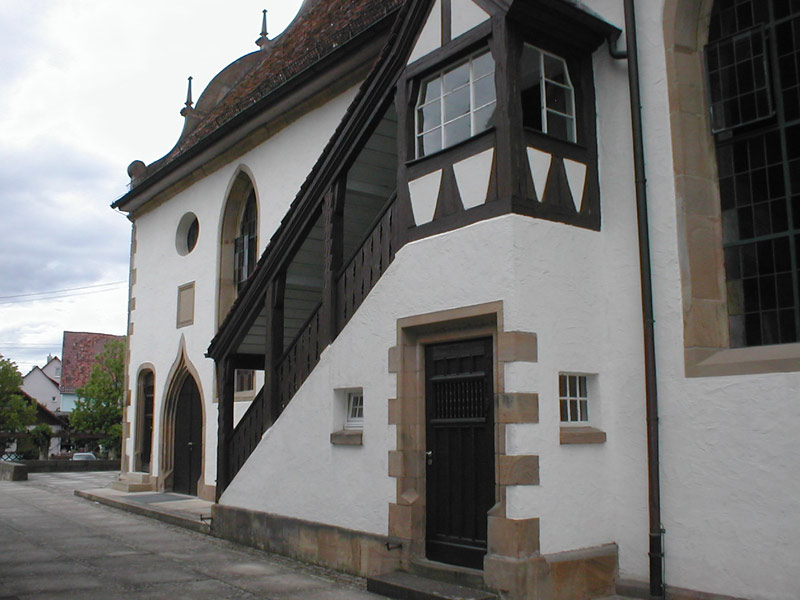
ascent up to the gallery of the Lambertuskirche

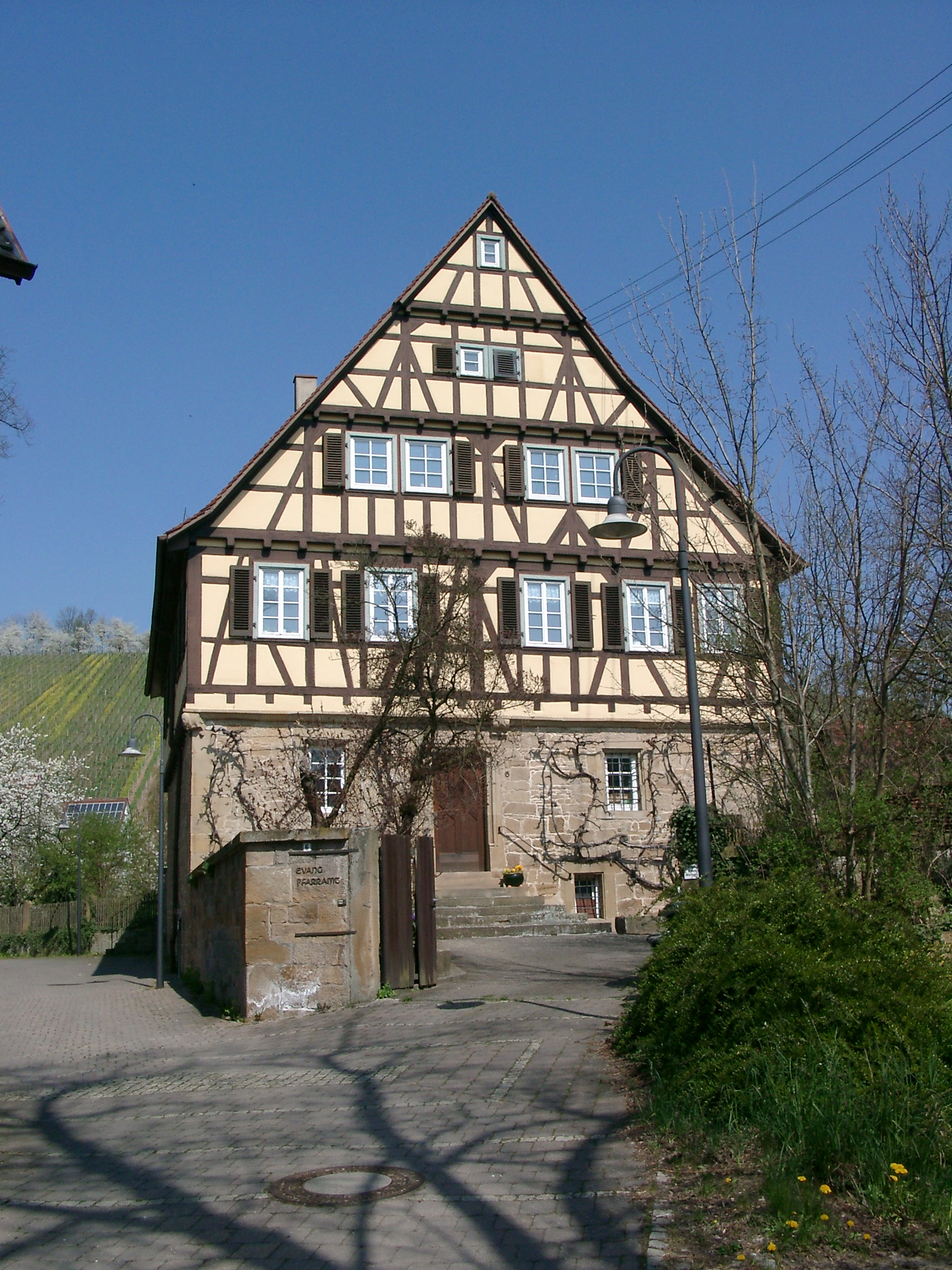
Protestant priest's office

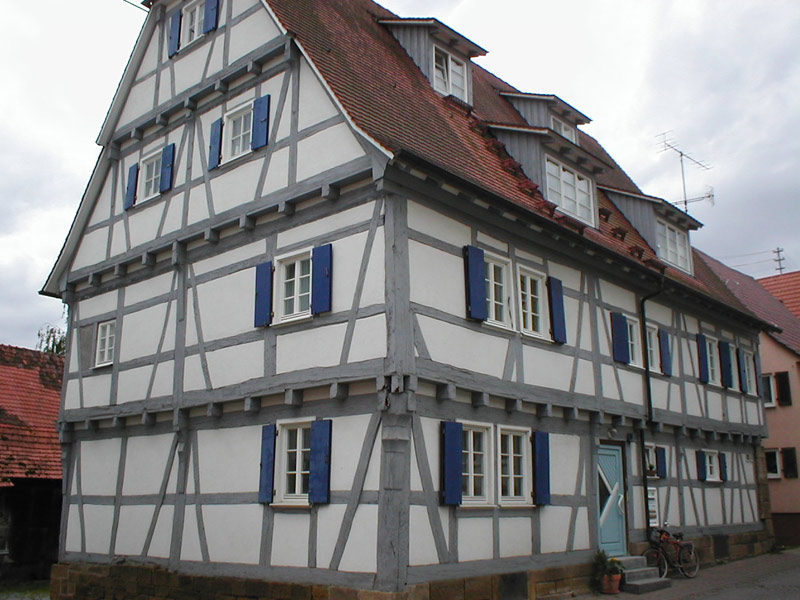
Hauptstraße 21, built in 1508

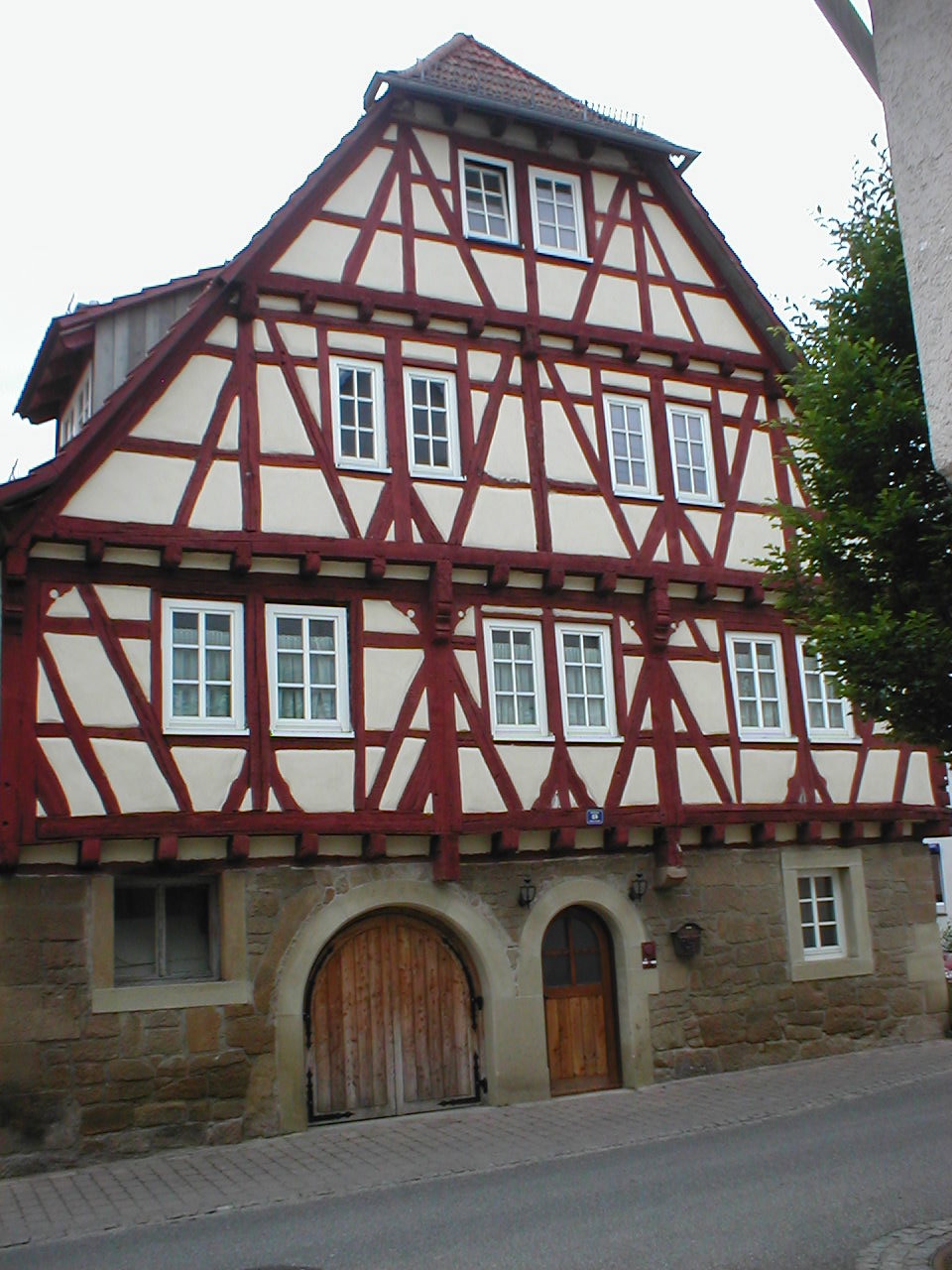
Hauptstraße 25, built in 1563

== Economy and infrastructure ==
Bigger local factories are Lang-Verpackungen and Betonwerk Volland GmbH with 70 employees each one.

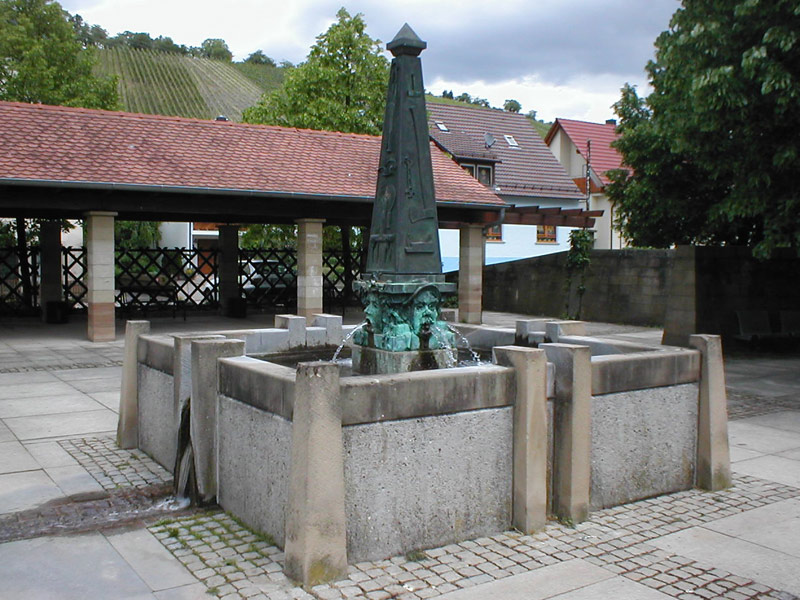
fountain at the Kelterplatz in front of the parish church

=== Traffic ===
Connections to the long-distance network exist in Lauffen am Neckar and Kirchheim am Neckar (B 27). Public transport in the PTE H3NV is ensured by buses. Connections to the rail network are also in Lauffen am Neckar und Kirchheim am Neckar (Frankenbahn).

The laid up Zabergäubahn (Lauffen am Neckar–Leonbronn) has stations in Pfaffenhofen and Weiler. The rail route shall be a part of the stadtbahn network Heilbronn until 2011. However, in July 2006 a report appeared making this doubtful.

=== Media ===
About happenings in Pfaffenhofen the Heilbronner Stimme reports in its south-west edition.

=== Education ===
Pfaffenhofen has a primary school at its disposal.
