= Cleebronn =

Municipality in Germany

- Municipality
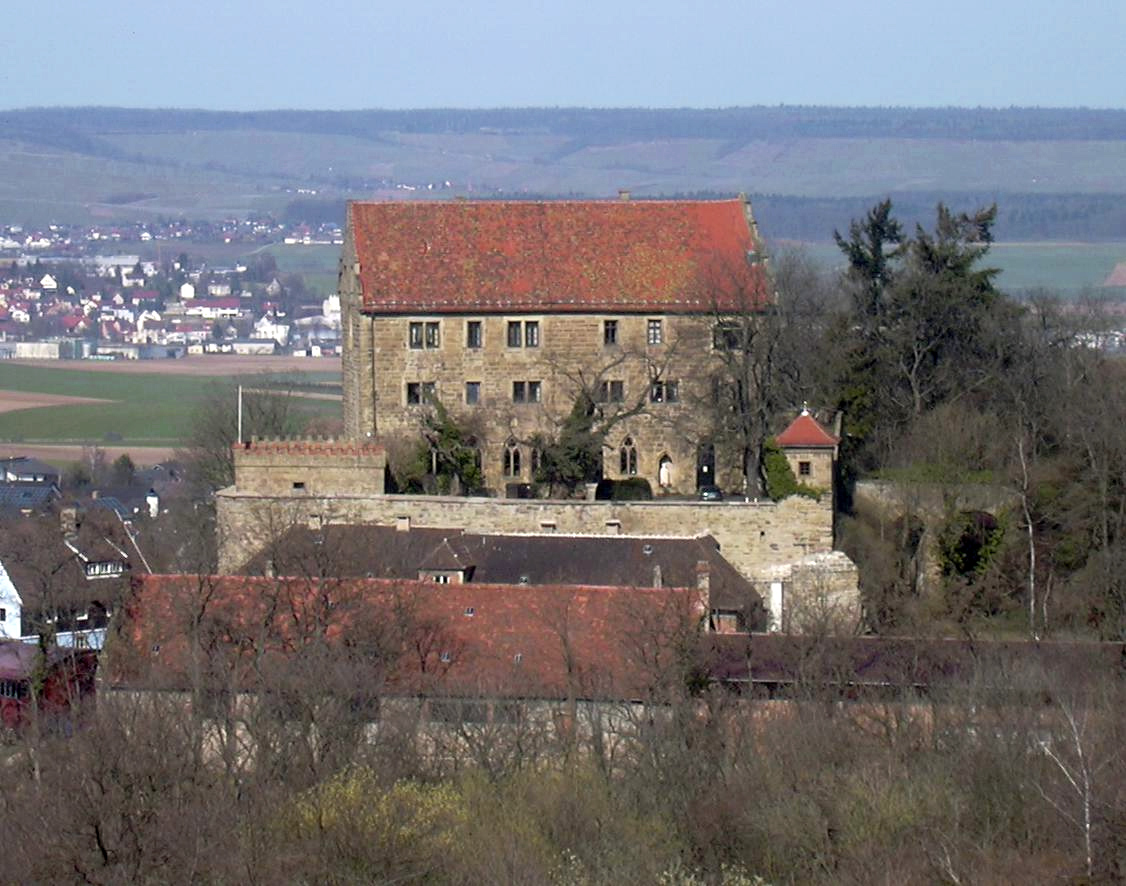
- Magenheim castle

- Coat of arms

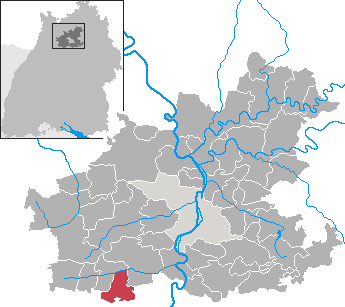
- Location of Cleebronn within Heilbronn district
- Interactive map of Cleebronn
- Location within Germany Location within Baden-Württemberg
- Coordinates: 49°3′N 9°2′E
- Country: Germany
- State: Baden-Württemberg
- Admin. region: Stuttgart
- District: Heilbronn

Government
  - Mayor (2018–26): Thomas Vogl

Area
  - Total: 17.09 km^{2} (6.60 sq mi)
- Elevation: 236 m (774 ft)

Population (2025-12-31)
  - Total: 3,037
  - Density: 177.7/km^{2} (460.3/sq mi)
- Time zone: UTC+01:00 (CET)
  - Summer (DST): UTC+02:00 (CEST)
- Postal codes: 74389
- Dialling codes: 07135
- Vehicle registration: HN
- Website: www.cleebronn.de

Cleebronn (German: [kleːˈbʁɔn]) is a municipality in the district of Heilbronn in Baden-Württemberg in southern Germany.

== Geography ==
Cleebronn is in the Zabergäu in the south of the district of Heilbronn, directly in the north of the Stromberg mountain with an elevation of 220 to 260 metres (720 to 850 ft). The landscape is characterised by wine-growing. The symbol of the municipality and the whole Zabergäu is the Michaelsberg, which has an elevation of 394 metres (1,293 ft).

=== Neighbouring municipalities ===
Neighbouring towns of Cleebronn are (clockwise from the west): Güglingen, Brackenheim (both in the district of Heilbronn), Bönnigheim and Sachsenheim (both in the district of Ludwigsburg). Cleebronn has combined with Brackenheim to form a joint association.

=== Municipal structure ===
Cleebronn includes the villages of Treffentrill and Katharinenplaisir.

== History ==
The first documented mention of Cleebronn was in 1279 as Kleberen. In the 13th century there were some possessions of the Principality of Mainz around the Michaelsberg being rented to Cleebronn's Lords of Magenheim.

In the 14th century, Württemberg acquired around two-thirds of the village as Württembergisch Cleebronn. The other third stayed in the possession of the principality as Mainzisch Cleebronn. In 1785 Württemberg acquired this last third, but stayed independent. These municipalities which independent until 1843 were called Alt-Cleebronn and Neu-Cleebronn until 1811. These two remaining parts were not united with the rest until January 1, 1844.

Cleebronn has a Protestant parish.

== Politics ==
=== District council ===
The district council of Cleebronn has 12 seats.

The mayor is also a member of the district council and its chairman.

== Notable people ==
- Sigismund Koelle (1820-1902), missionary and linguistic researcher
- Carl Krauch (1853-1934), chemist

== Gallery ==
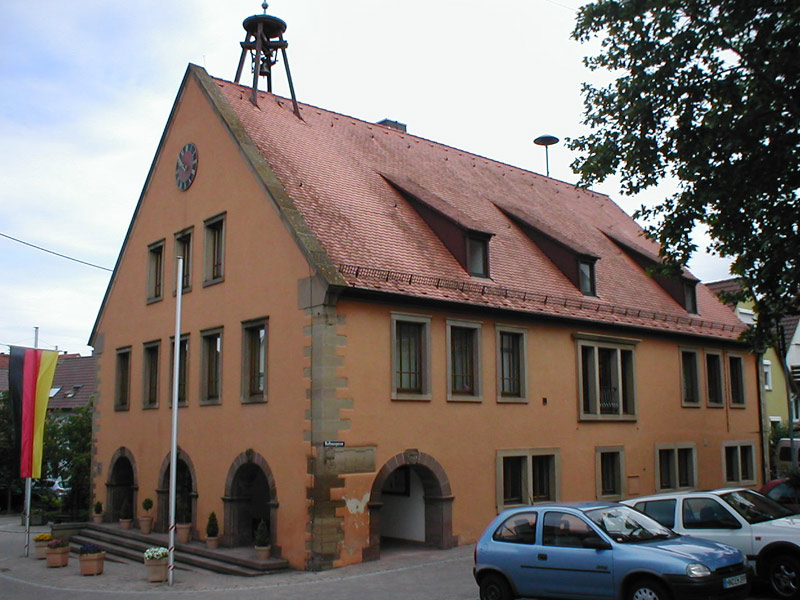
town hall

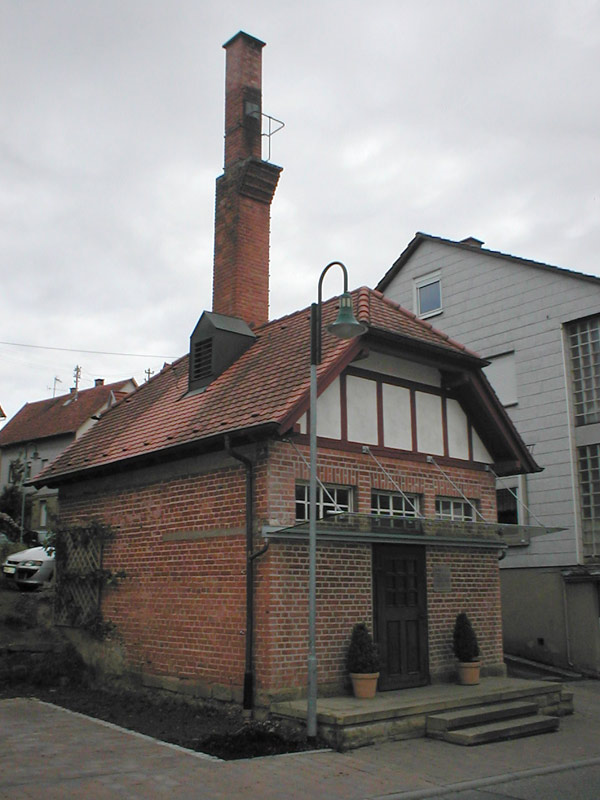
Backhaus of 1930

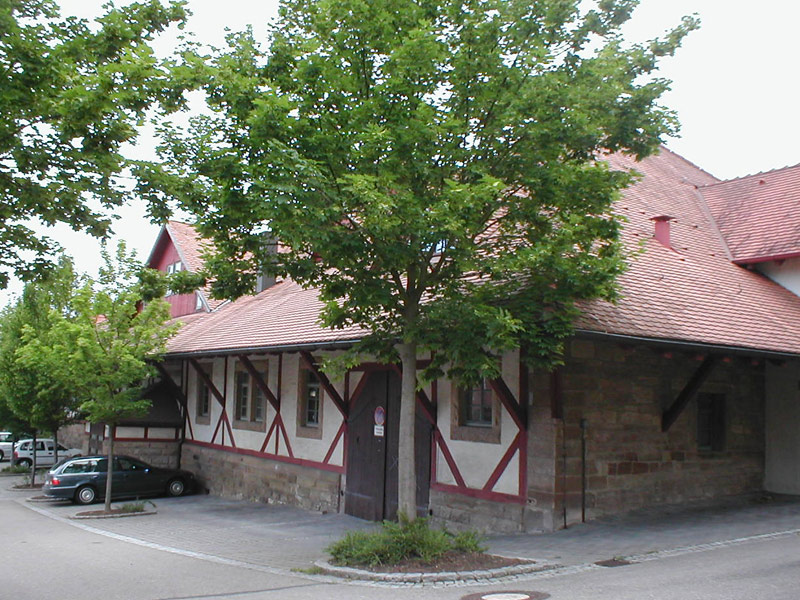
wine-press of 1907

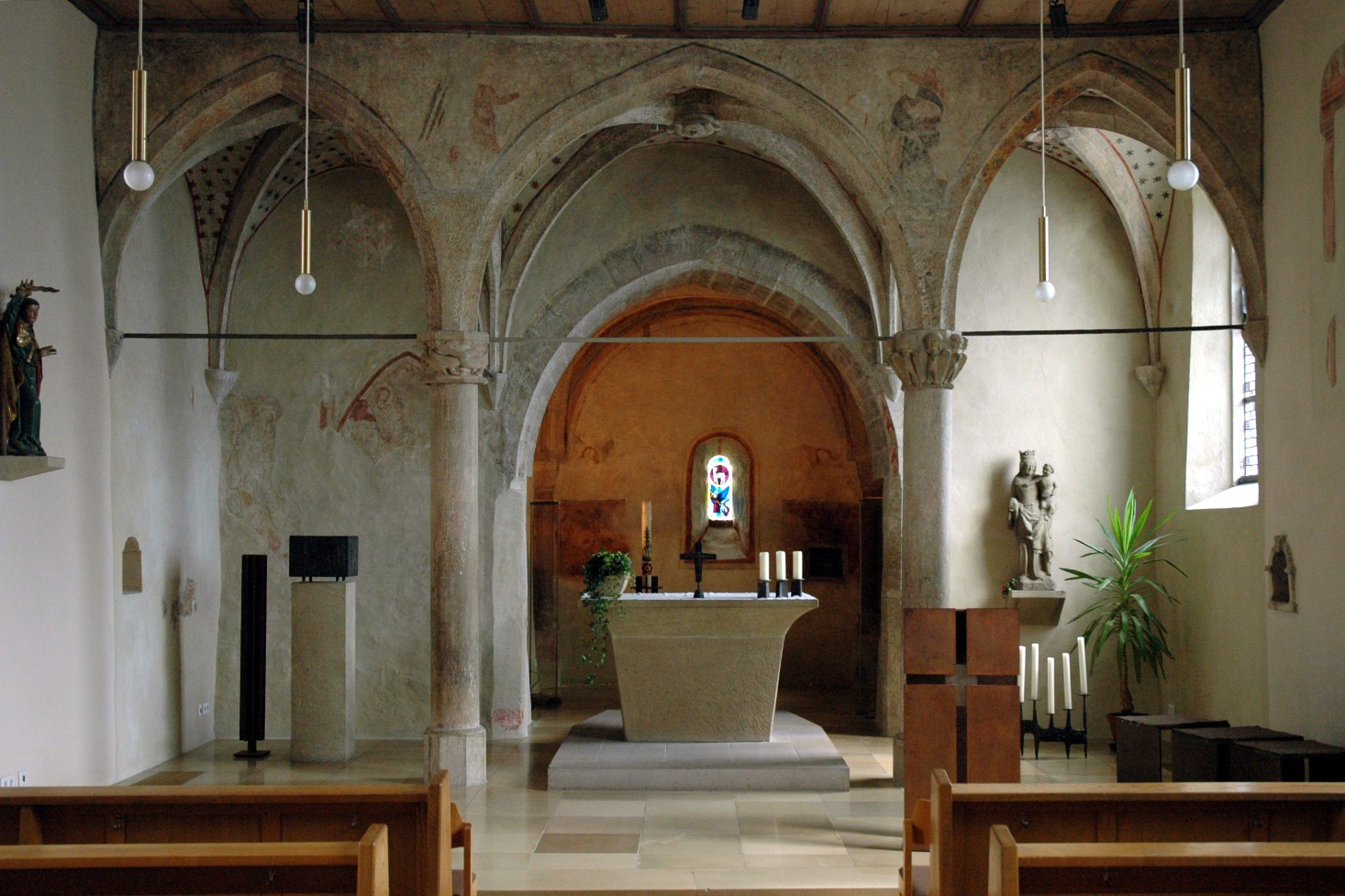
inside the Michaelskirche
