= Dennis Klecker =

German politician (born 1990)

Member of the Landtag of Baden-Württemberg
- Incumbent
- Assumed office 1 September 2023
- Preceded by: Rainer Podeswa

Personal details
- Born: 2 September 1990 (age 35) Heilbronn
- Party: Alternative for Germany (since 2013)

Dennis Klecker (born 2 September 1990 in Heilbronn) is a German politician serving as a member of the Landtag of Baden-Württemberg since 2023. He has been a member of the Alternative for Germany since 2013.
