= Dieffenbacher =

- Company type: GmbH
- Industry: Machinery manufacturing
- Founded: 1873; 153 years ago
- Headquarters: Eppingen, Baden-Württemberg, Germany
- Key people: Christian Dieffenbacher, Lukas Langer, Stefan Zipf, Lothar Fischer, Volker Kitzelmann
- Revenue: €417 million (2017)
- Number of employees: 1,700 (2017)
- Website: dieffenbacher.com/en/

Founded in 1873, the Dieffenbacher Group, located in Eppingen in the administrative district of Heilbronn in Baden-Württemberg, is a family-run enterprise in the field of mechanical engineering, plant systems engineering, and construction. They develop and manufacture press systems and complete production systems for the wood composites (e.g. oriented strand boards), automobile, aerospace and recycling industries. In addition, the company develops power plants and process equipment for energy generation and waste heat recovery.

== History ==
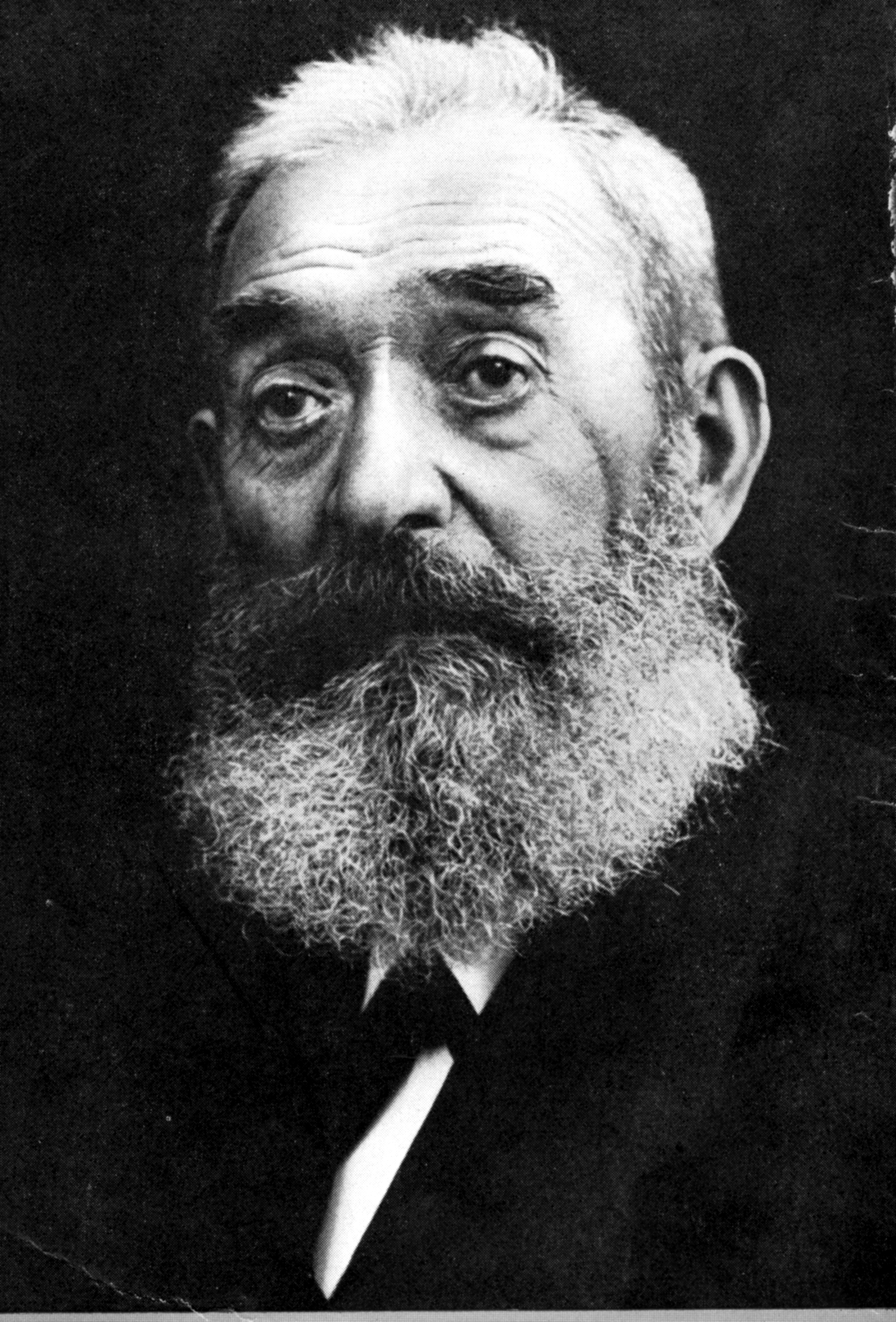
Jakob Dieffenbacher

The Dieffenbacher company was founded by Jakob Dieffenbacher in 1873 in Eppingen. Jakob Dieffenbacher was a German master metalworker. The small enterprise performed various metalworking tasks as well as repairs of all kinds, especially for machines used in farming.

After their master's examinations, Wilhelm and Friedrich Dieffenbacher, two sons of Jakob Dieffenbacher and master metalworkers joined the family business as the second generation. In 1910, Wilhelm and Friedrich transferred the ownership of the metalworking shop in the historical center of Eppingen to their brother Heinrich Dieffenbacher. At the same time, a factory directed by the brothers Wilhelm and Friedrich was constructed on Heilbronner Strasse in Eppingen. The company was then renamed the ‘Maschinenbauanstalt J. Dieffenbacher-Söhne’ (J Dieffenbacher and Sons Engineering Company). At this time, the company's product range was actively converting to industrial products. The focus of production was on hydraulic fruit, wine and oil presses. With the increasing focus on the manufacture of machines, what was once known as the Maschinenbauanstalt (Engineering company) became the Maschinenfabrik (Machinery plant) in 1914.

After the end of the First World War, Dieffenbacher expanded its oil press and oil plant manufacturing business. In the mid-1920s, Dieffenbacher built the first hydraulic presses for use on Bakelite for the plastics industry.

In the decade after World War II, Dieffenbacher's production product range changed. The company gradually transitioned away from the production of presses for fruits and oil and went into the production of heavy machinery and industrial presses.

As the third generation, Albert and Gerhard Dieffenbacher joined and assumed management of the company in 1952. Beginning in the 1950s the company set one focus amongst others on the production of particle board, veneer and plywood presses due to the boom in the wood sector.

Dieffenbacher began receiving their first export orders from other European countries in 1956. The export business expanded rapidly beyond Europe in the 1960s with orders from countries such as the United States, Brazil, Mexico and many more.

From the 1960s onward, Dieffenbacher introduced new products for the forming sector and further produced e.g. injection molding machines or presses for processing fiber-reinforced polyester plastics.

Somewhere around the middle of the 1970s, Dieffenbacher constructed a continuous cold pre-pressing system, an enormous step towards continuous particle board production for the company.

As the fourth Dieffenbacher generation, Wolf-Gerd Dieffenbacher joined the company in 1980. In the following decades, the company expanded globally and became a complete systems manufacturer.

In 1999, Dieffenbacher further expanded its plastics-forming technology division by developing the direct process for long-fiber-reinforced thermoplastics (D-LFTs).

In 2011, Dieffenbacher was awarded the AVK Innovation Award for the development of the direct manufacturing process for SMC parts. They also introduced the HP-RTM system to the market. In 2014, Dieffenbacher founded its Recycling division. The focus of this operation is on the manufacture of complete systems for the treatment of various industrial waste materials. Another milestone was soon to follow in 2015; In that year, Dieffenbacher presented a new continuous press for the manufacture of particle board, the CPS+, successor to the CPS press system.

Christian Dieffenbacher stepped up into company management in 2016 after two years as a consultant. In the same year, Dieffenbacher has developed the Tailored Blank Line for the mass production of locally reinforced thermoplastic components consisting of the Fibercon and the Fiberforge.

On 1 January 2024, Dieffenbacher acquired the know-how and key assets of the Austrian power plant manufacturer BERTSCHenergy through the DIEFFENBACHER Energy GmbH subsidiary.

Also in January 2024, Lukas Langer, grandson of Albert Dieffenbacher, joined the management board, taking over the position of Chief Financial Officer (CFO).

== Fields of activity ==
Dieffenbacher's fields of activity can be divided up into three general areas:

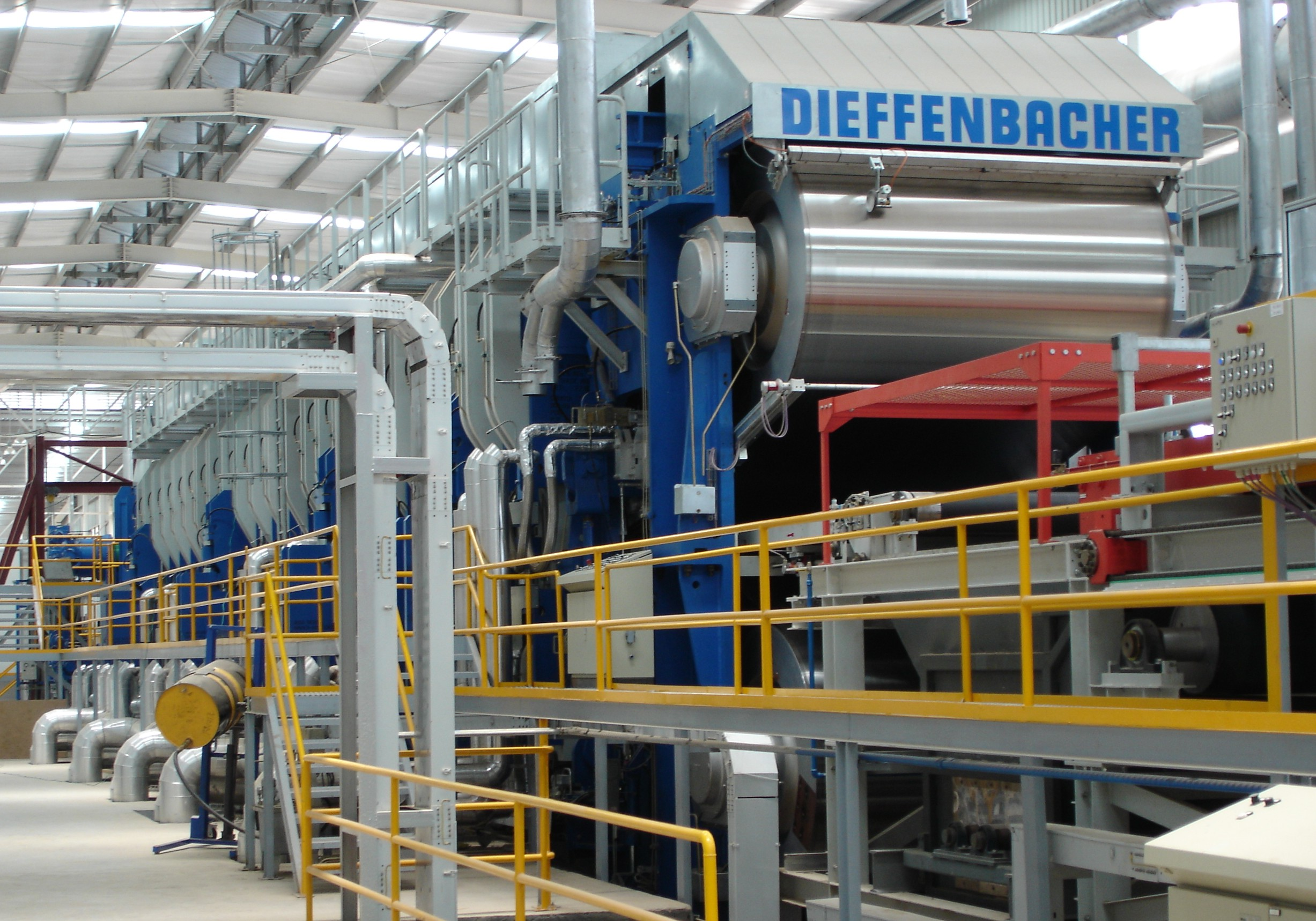
Dieffenbacher particle board press

=== Wood business unit (wood-based panel technologies) ===
Dieffenbacher's wood business unit plans and constructs complete solutions for the wood products industry. Here, they manufacture production systems for particle board, medium-density fiberboard (MDF), high-density fiberboard (HDF), oriented strand boards (OSB/OSL) as well as laminated veneer lumber (LVL). Dieffenbacher supplies solutions from the shredding of the supplied wood to the pressing of the boards all the way to the application of the surface finish. A complete system for the manufacture of wooden composite board typically encompasses power-generating facilities, shredding machines, dryers, sieves and sifters, gluing apparatus, controls, forming lines, intermittent or continuous press systems, coating units, finishing-, warehousing- and process control systems as well as online maintenance systems. After-sales services and plant modernization are also a part of the range of products and services supplied by the Wood business unit.

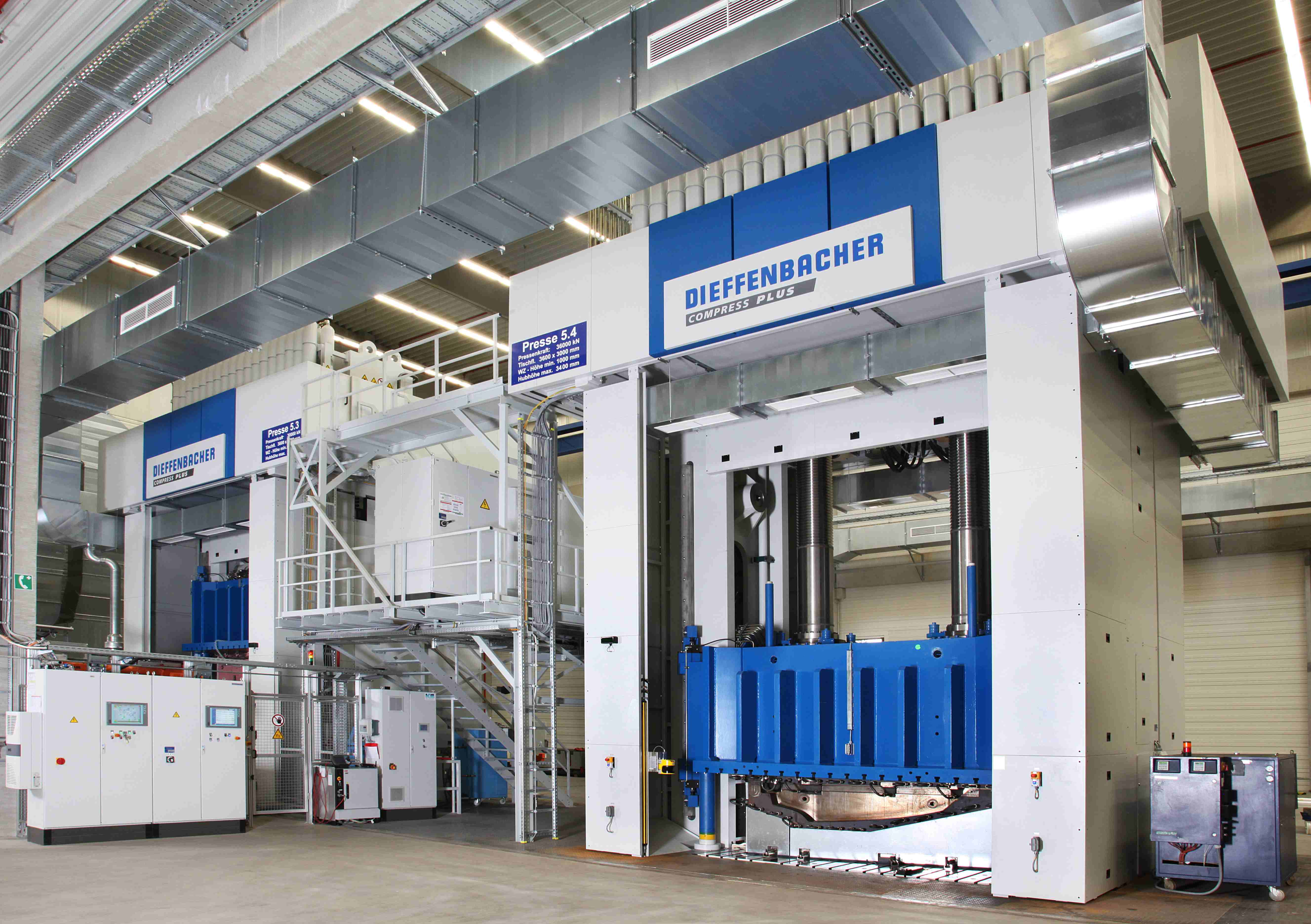
Dieffenbacher plastics-forming press

=== Forming business unit (forming technologies) ===
The Forming division develops methods, processes and fully automated production plants for the manufacture of fiber-reinforced components. Some of the manufacturing processes are the Long Fiber Thermoplastics (LFT) Molding process, the Sheet Molding Compound (SMC) process and the High-Pressure Resin Transfer Molding (HP-RTM) process, among others. To mass-produce carbon fiber components using the HP-RTM process, Dieffenbacher produces fully automated, ready-to-use production lines that include a Preform Center. They additionally manufacture production lines for hybrid components as well as liquid resin press molding systems. Dieffenbacher supplies every element for ready-to-use systems, from the hydraulic presses to the complete automation right down to components for the manufacture of semi-finished products. The modernization of plants and their subcomponents is also a part of the Forming business unit's services. Dieffenbacher also steadily develops and combines different composites processes. The company works with independent research institutes and carries out joint research projects with customers. For the metal forming sector, the machine and plant manufacturer develops hydraulic forming presses and press lines for forming metal and stainless steel. These include, for example, hydraulic single presses, embossing presses or automated production lines for the manufacturing of components and solutions for different sectors such as automotive, railroad and store fitting.

=== Recycling business unit ===
Dieffenbacher's Recycling business unit develops and produces complete recycling facilities, which treat industrial and household waste both mechanically and biologically for the reclamation of secondary resources or to generate energy. To process waste wood, for example, Dieffenbacher conceive plans for entire plants, from shredding to drying, sieving and sifting to burner systems and extraction technologies.

=== Energy business unit ===
Dieffenbacher's Energy business unit develops and realizes fluidized bed combustion systems for solid fuels (e.g. biomass), gas and steam turbines for power and steam production, industrial waste heat systems, process equipment and solutions to use conventional grate firing in energy systems.

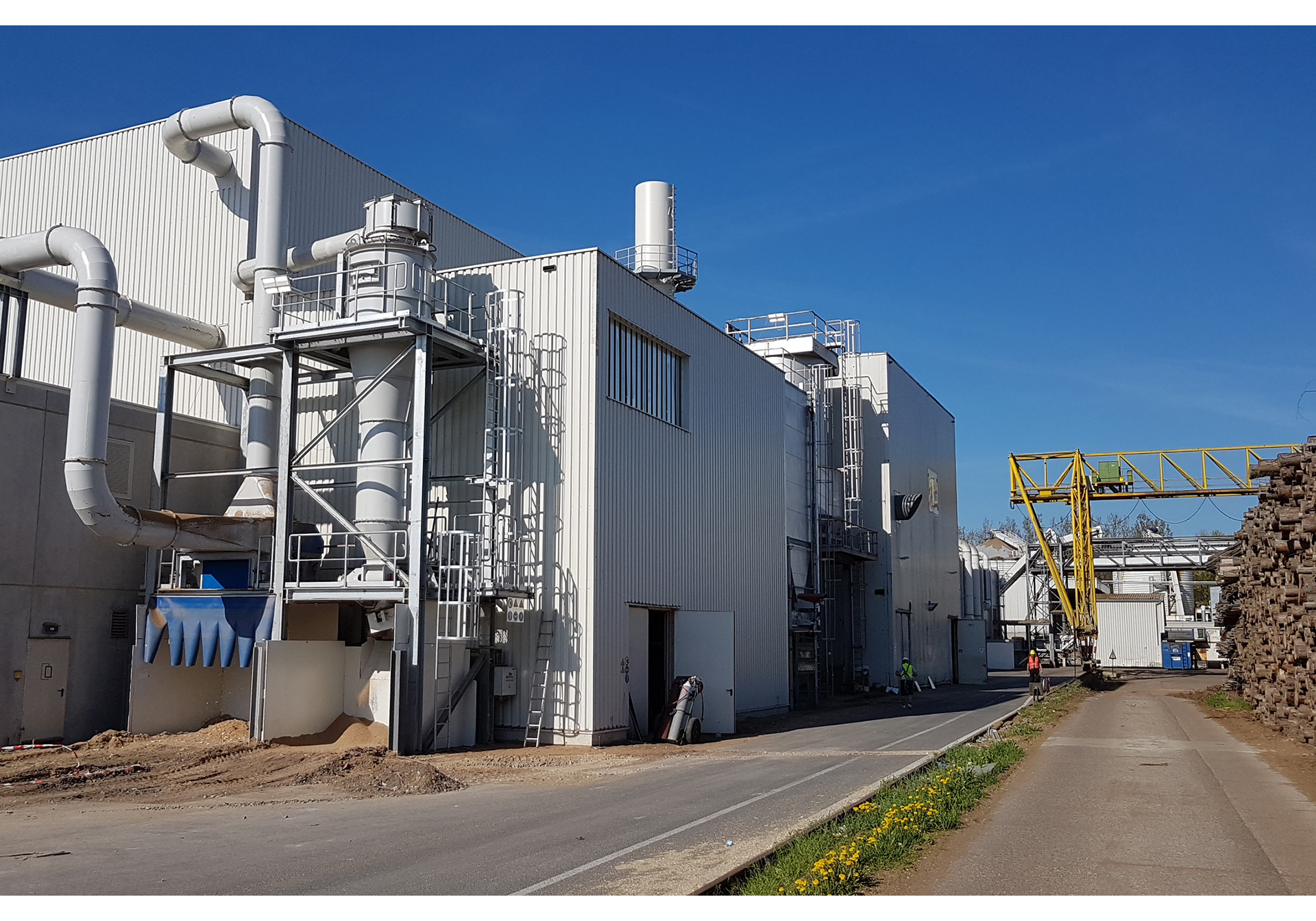
Dieffenbacher waste wood recycling plant

== Companies and locations ==
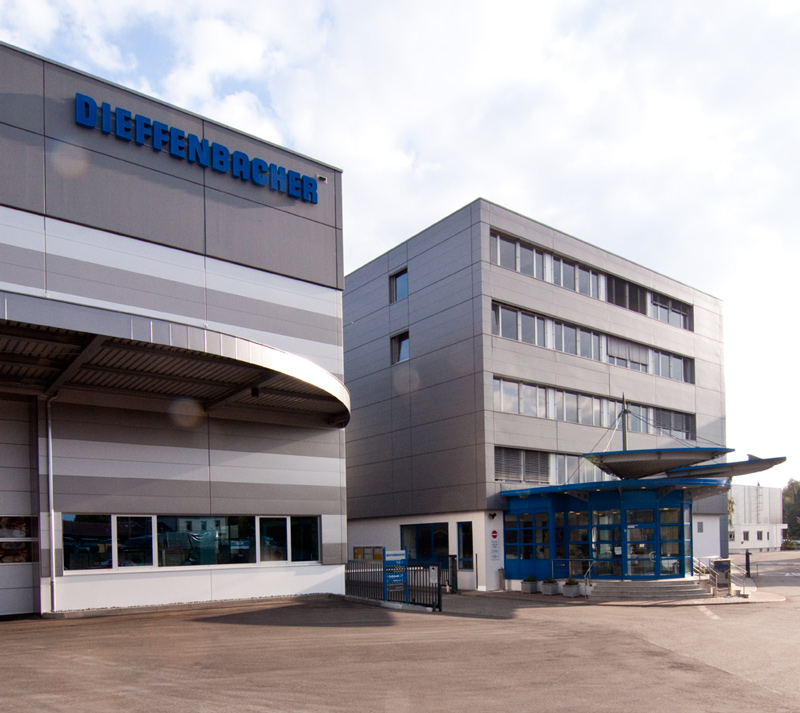
Head office of the Dieffenbacher Group in Eppingen

Locations of the Dieffenbacher Group:

Company	Location	Function
Dieffenbacher do Brasil	Curitiba, Brazil	Service site
Dieffenbacher North America, Inc.	Ontario, Windsor, Canada	Production site
Dieffenbacher Machinery Services (Beijing) Co., Ltd.	Beijing, China	Sales site, service site
Shanghai Wood-based Panel Machinery Co., Ltd	Shanghai, China	Development site for 4 ft wood composite plants, production site, sales site, service site
Dieffenbacher CZ hydraulické lisy, s.r.o.	Brno, Czech Republic	Production site
Dieffenbacher Panelboard Oy	Nastola, Finland	Development site for screening, cleaning, dispersion, finishing, sales and marketing site, service site
Dieffenbacher GmbH Maschinen- und Anlagenbau	Eppingen, Germany	Head office, production site, sales site and service site
Jung Werkzeugbau GmbH	Ötigheim, Germany	Production site
Dieffenbacher Industriemarketing GmbH	Eppingen, Germany	Marketing services
Dieffenbacher GmbH Maschinen- und Anlagenbau Betriebsstätte Leverkusen	Leverkusen, Germany	Development site for driers, sifters and environmental systems, sales site, service site
B. Maier Zerkleinerungstechnik GmbH	Bielefeld, Germany	Development site for size reduction machines, sales site, service site
Dieffenbacher India Pvt. Ltd.	Bangalore, India	Sales site
Dieffenbacher Asia Pacific SDN. BHD.	Petaling Jaya, Malaysia	Service site
Dieffenbacher TH Ltd.	Bangkok, Thailand	Service site
Dieffenbacher Customer Support, LLC	Alpharetta, USA	Service site
Dieffenbacher GmbH Maschinen und Anlagenbau - Turkey Liaison Office		Service site
Dieffenbacher Energy GmbH	Bludenz, Austria	Engineering and Sales site
Dieffenbacher Energy GmbH	Vienna, Austria	Sales site
Dieffenbacher Polska Sp. z o.o.	Sosnowiec, Poland	Engineering site

== General economic data ==
In 2023, Dieffenbacher employed around 1,850 people at 19 locations worldwide. In 2017, Dieffenbacher recorded sales of 417 million euros.
