= Eppingen =

- Town
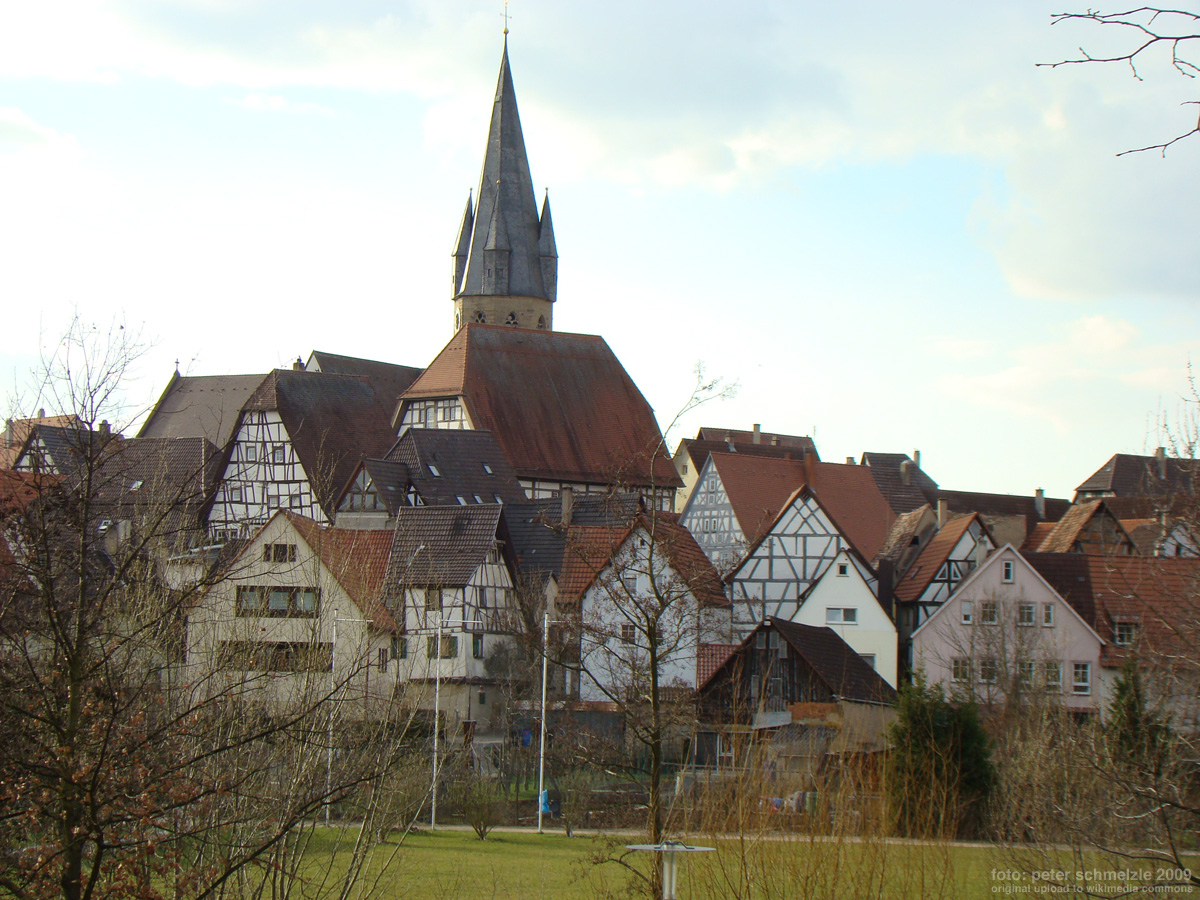
- Historic city center

- Coat of arms

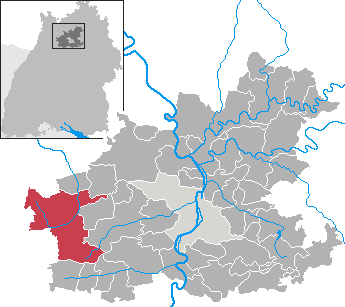
- Location of Eppingen within Heilbronn district
- Interactive map of Eppingen
- Location within Germany Location within Baden-Württemberg
- Coordinates: 49°8′N 8°55′E
- Country: Germany
- State: Baden-Württemberg
- Admin. region: Stuttgart
- District: Heilbronn
- Subdivisions: 7

Government
  - Mayor (2020–28): Klaus Holaschke (Ind.)

Area
  - Total: 88.59 km^{2} (34.20 sq mi)
- Elevation: 199 m (653 ft)

Population (2025-12-31)
  - Total: 22,796
  - Density: 257.3/km^{2} (666.5/sq mi)
- Time zone: UTC+01:00 (CET)
  - Summer (DST): UTC+02:00 (CEST)
- Postal codes: 75031
- Dialling codes: 07262, 07260, 07138
- Vehicle registration: HN
- Website: www.eppingen.de

Eppingen (German: [ˈɛpɪŋən]) is a town in the district of Heilbronn in Baden-Württemberg in southern Germany. The town has the second-largest population in the district.

Eppingen lies in the Kraichgau, a hilly region in southwestern Germany, close to the confluence of the Elsenz and Hilsbach Rivers.

== History ==
Eppingen was first mentioned in 985 when Otto III gave the settlement to the diocese of Worms. The ending "-ingen" was common for towns colonised by the Alamanni clan in the 3rd and 4th centuries.

Eppingen was owned by Salier in the 11th century, and by the Staufer in the 12th century. In 1188, it became a fortified village and, in 1192, a town, elevated by Heinrich VI. The town was distrained several times in the 14th century, but never lost the status of a town. After the win of the Electorate of the Palatinate over margraviate Baden in 1435, it finally became a part of the Electorate of the Palatinate but was once more distrained to the knights of Gemmingen, from 1469 to approximately 1520. In the 15th and 16th centuries, Eppingen underwent an economic boom during which its Latin school was first mentioned (1421). In a time of the plague a part of the Heidelberg University moved to the Latin school in 1496.

During the Palatinate wars of succession, Eppingen functioned as the main storage facility for the German army. From 1695 to 1697, the Eppingen Lines (Eppinger Linien), a string of earthwork fortifications and watchtowers, were built. They served as large defending walls against French raids at that time. One watchtower, called the Chartaque, was built by local students to show the architecture of those ancient buildings. Eppingen was affiliated to Baden in 1803. It maintained the second oldest school of agriculture in Baden. At the end of the 19th century, Eppingen was connected to the railway network; the Kraichgau Railway was opened to Karlsruhe in 1879 and to Heilbronn in 1880 and the Steinsfurt–Eppingen railway, which connected to Heidelberg, was opened in 1899.

During 1971 and 1972, Eppingen annexed the six surrounding communities of Adelshofen, Elsenz, Richen, Rohrbach am Gießhübel, Kleingartach and Mühlbach. In 2000, Eppingen's population exceeded 20,000; and it attained the status of a district town in 2002.

=== Population Change ===
Year	Population
1778	1,570
1809	2,320
1825	2,750
1852	3,266
1871	3,337
1880 ¹	3,621
1890 ¹	3,546
1900 ¹	3,467
1910 ¹	3,402
1919 ¹	3,372
1925 ¹	3,389
1933 ¹	3,506

Year	Population
1939 ¹	3,416
1945	3,863
1950 ¹	4,891
1961 ¹	5,501
1970 ¹	6,708
1975	14,870
1980	14,833
1987 ¹	15,462
1990	16,418
1995	18,688
2000	20,257
2004	21,017

=== Mayors ===
- 1808-1813: Heinrich Jakob Raußmüller
- 1813-1816: Carl Morano
- 1816-1831: Ludwig Lother
- 1831-1844: Friedrich Hochstetter
- 1844-1847: Johann Ludwig Raußmüller
- 1847-1859: Wilhelm Lother
- 1859-1866: Gustav Hochstetter
- 1866-1870: Ludwig Lother
- 1870-1878: Heinrich Raußmüller
- 1878-1890: Paul Bentel
- 1890-1894: Heinrich Schmelcher
- 1894-1903: Philipp Vielhauer
- 1903-1933: Albert Wirth
- 1933-1937: Karl Doll
- 1937-1945: Karl Zutavern
- 1945-1948: Jakob Dörr
- 1948-1966: Karl Thomä
- 1966-1980: Rüdiger Peuckert
- 1980-2004: Erich Pretz
- 2004–Present: Klaus Holaschke

=== Coat of arms ===
The arms of Eppingen are: Or, a bend gules, impaling sable, an eagle displayed or, wings elevated, armed gules. The city flag is red-yellow.

== Economy and Infrastructure ==
see: Dieffenbacher

== Transport ==
Eppingen can be reached by A 6 (Mannheim-Heilbronn). Also, the B 293 (Karlsruhe–Heilbronn) goes through to town zone, however it acts as a bypass around the main town area.

Eppingen station is on the Kraichgau Railway, and is served by line S4 of the Karlsruhe Stadtbahn running to Karlsruhe and Heilbronn. It is also connected by the Steinsfurt–Eppingen line to Heidelberg, which is served by line S5 of the Rhine-Neckar S-Bahn.

== Landmarks ==
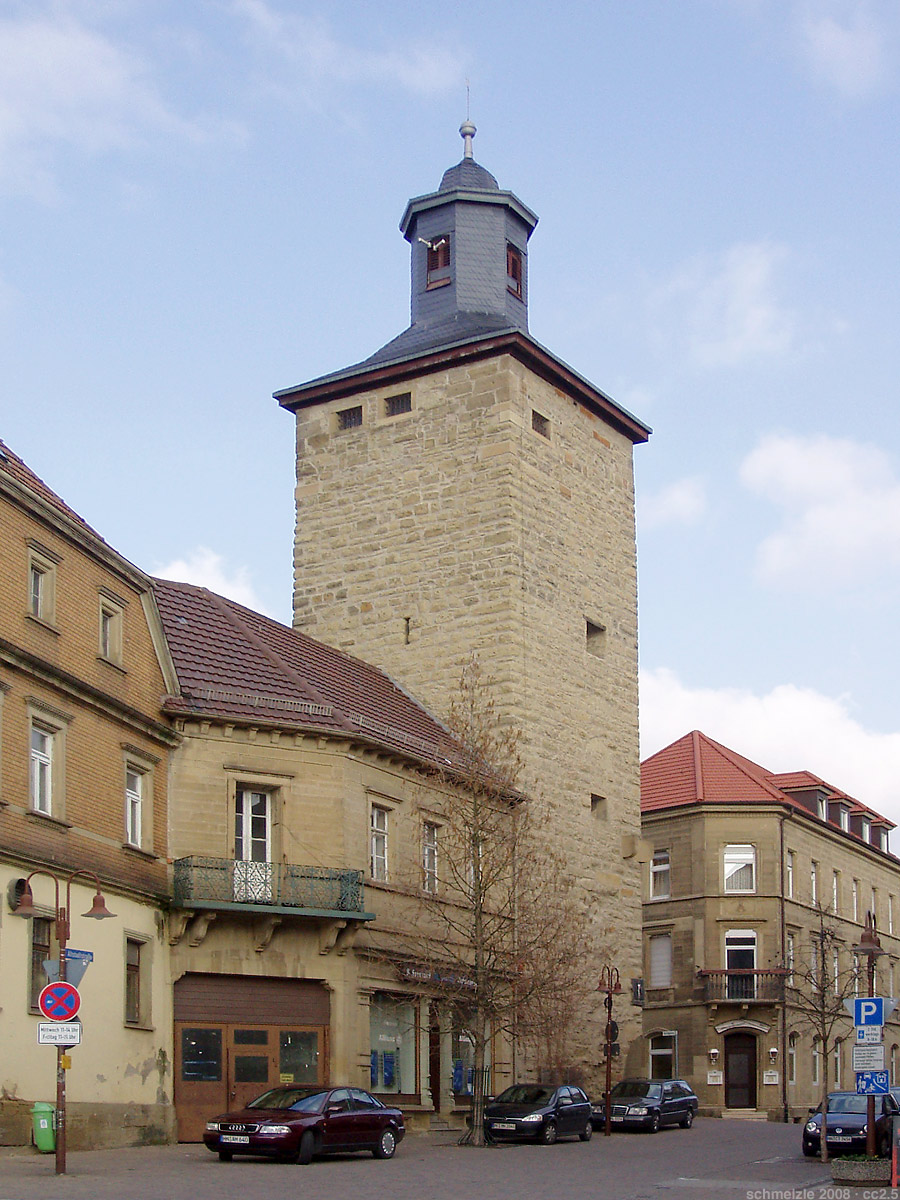
Pfeifferturm

The Pfeifferturm, a tower built in the 13th century, serves as the town's landmark. The "Old University" (German: Alte Universität) was built in 1494 and 1495 in the style of a late medieval store. Its name is a reminder of the year 1564, when a part of Heidelberg University was moved to Eppingen because of the plague. The Baumann House (German: Baumannsche Haus) is one of the prettiest and most famous timbered houses in the entire area of northern Baden. There are many beautiful timbered houses in downtown Eppingen, and because of this the city is a part of the German 'Fachwerkstraße' (German route of the most beautiful timbered houses).

== Town partnerships ==
Eppingen has official partnerships with:

- Wassy (France) (département Haute-Marne) since 1967
- Epping (United Kingdom) (Essex) since 1981
- Szigetvár (Hungary) (Baranya) since 1992

== Sports ==
The VfB Eppingen is a local football club. The Rad- und Rollschuhverein (bike and rollerskating club) is another main sports club.

== Notable people ==
- Alfred Beck (1889–1957), born in Richen, veterinary physician
- Johan Maurits Mohr (1716–1775), German-Dutch clergyman and astronomer
- Rosemarie Wenner (born 1955), Bishop of the Evangelical-Methodist Church for Germany
