= Kraichgau =

Southern German hill region

Coordinates: 49°07′N 8°43′E

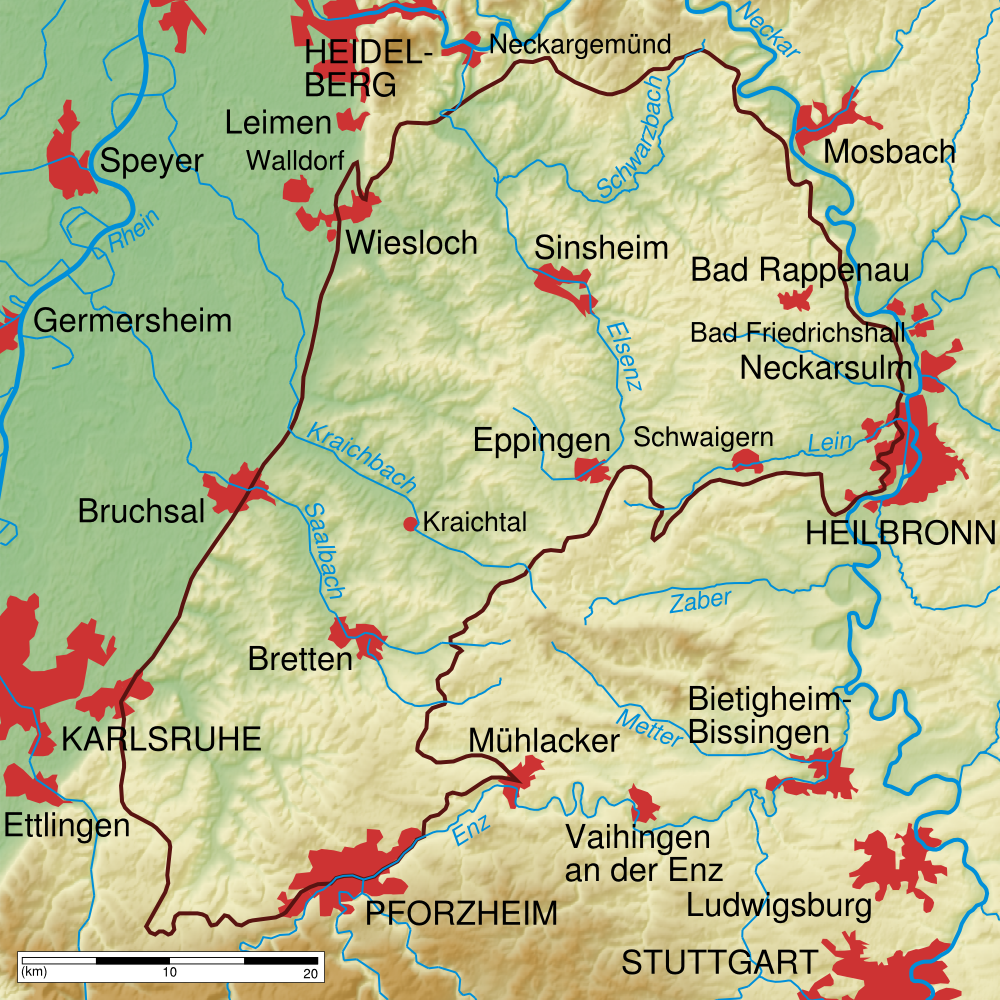
Physical map of the Kraichgau (within brown line)

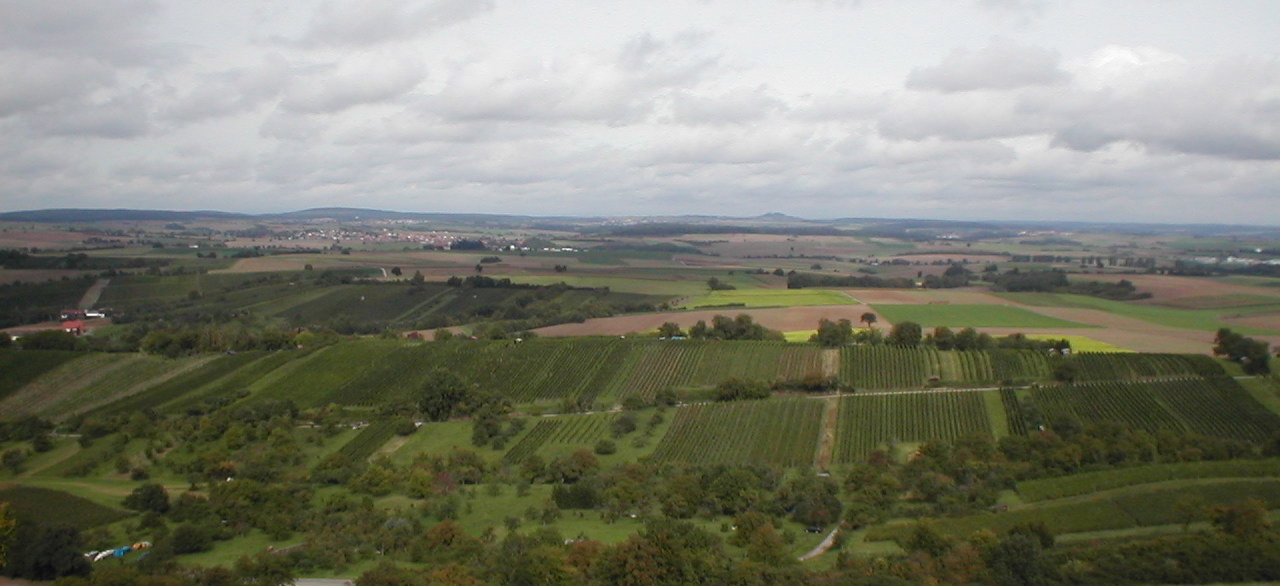
View from the Ravensburg near Sulzfeld over the Kraichgau hills to their highest point, Burg Steinsberg (centre, on the horizon)

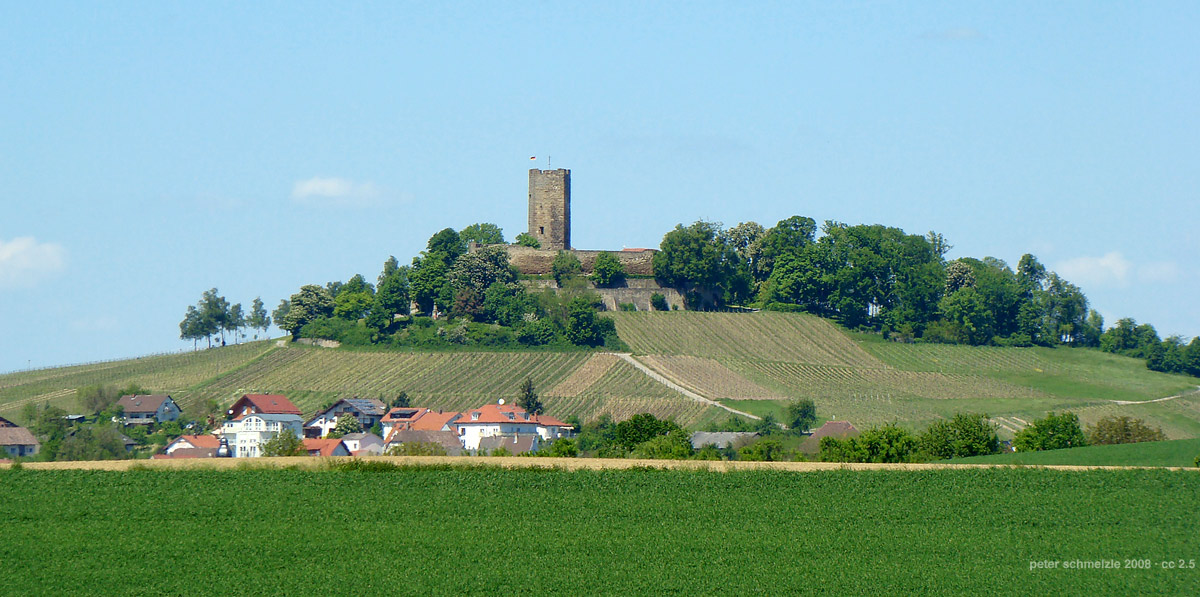
Steinsberg Castle on the eponymous hill, the highest point of the Kraichgau

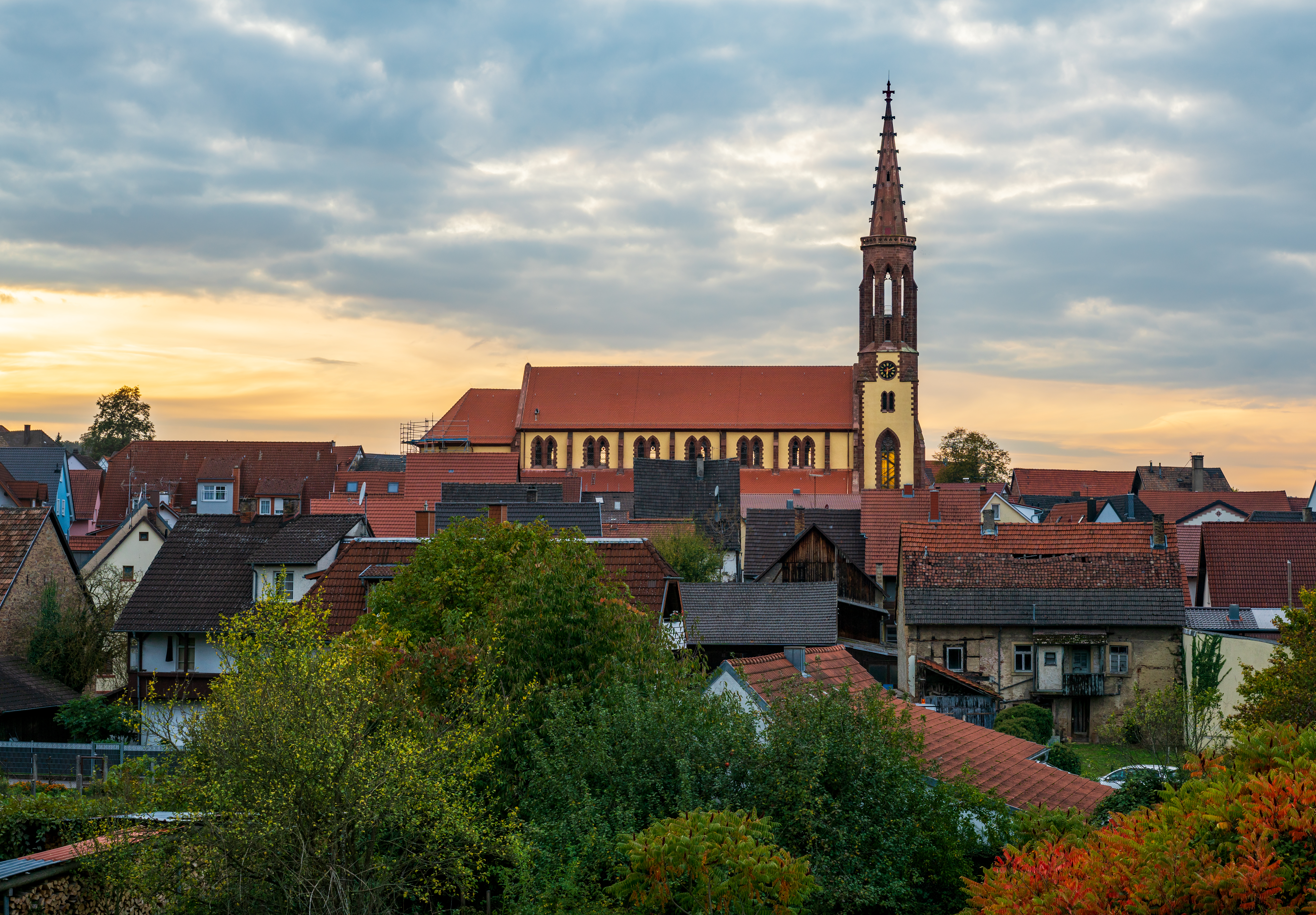
The prominent Catholic parish church of Waibstadt

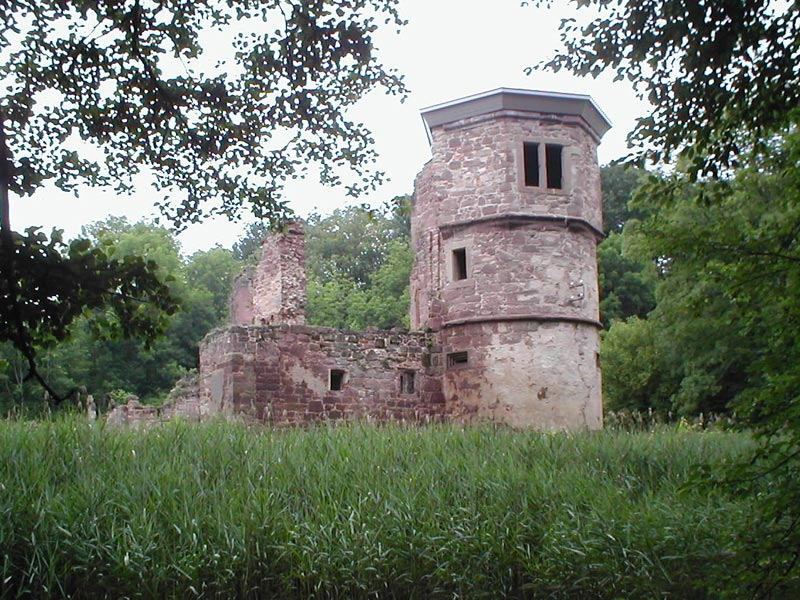
Ruins of the water castle in Kraichtal-Menzingen

The Kraichgau (German: [ˈkʁaɪçɡaʊ]) is a hilly region in Baden-Württemberg, southwestern Germany. It is bordered by the Odenwald and the Neckar to the North, the Black Forest to the South, and the Upper Rhine Plain to the West. To the east, its boundary is considered to be the Stromberg and the Heuchelberg.

The largest towns of the Kraichgau are Sinsheim, Eppingen, and Bretten. On the western end of the Kraichgau is the town of Bruchsal, the gateway to the Rhineland plains.

The mild climate and fertile soils allow for rural land use for orchards, vineyards and arable farming. Geographic features of the area include the Neckar and Enz river valleys and the Stromberg-Heuchelberg Nature Park.

The hilly region hosts an Ironman competition.

== Origins of the name ==
The word "Kraich" apparently arose from the Celtic word "Creuch," meaning "mud" or "loam." The territory of a Gau (country subdivision) signifies an open area, free from woods, such as farmland or meadows.

The area of Kraichgau was first mentioned in the Early Middle Ages, in the Lorsch codex, as "Creichgowe" in the year 769. In 773, it was called "Chrehgauui," in 778 "Craichgoia." By 1594, the name was closer to its modern form, being referred to as "Kreuchgau."

== See also ==
- Aalkistensee
- Kraichgau Railway
