= Maulbronn Monastery =

Monastery and World Heritage Site in Germany

- Kloster Maulbronn
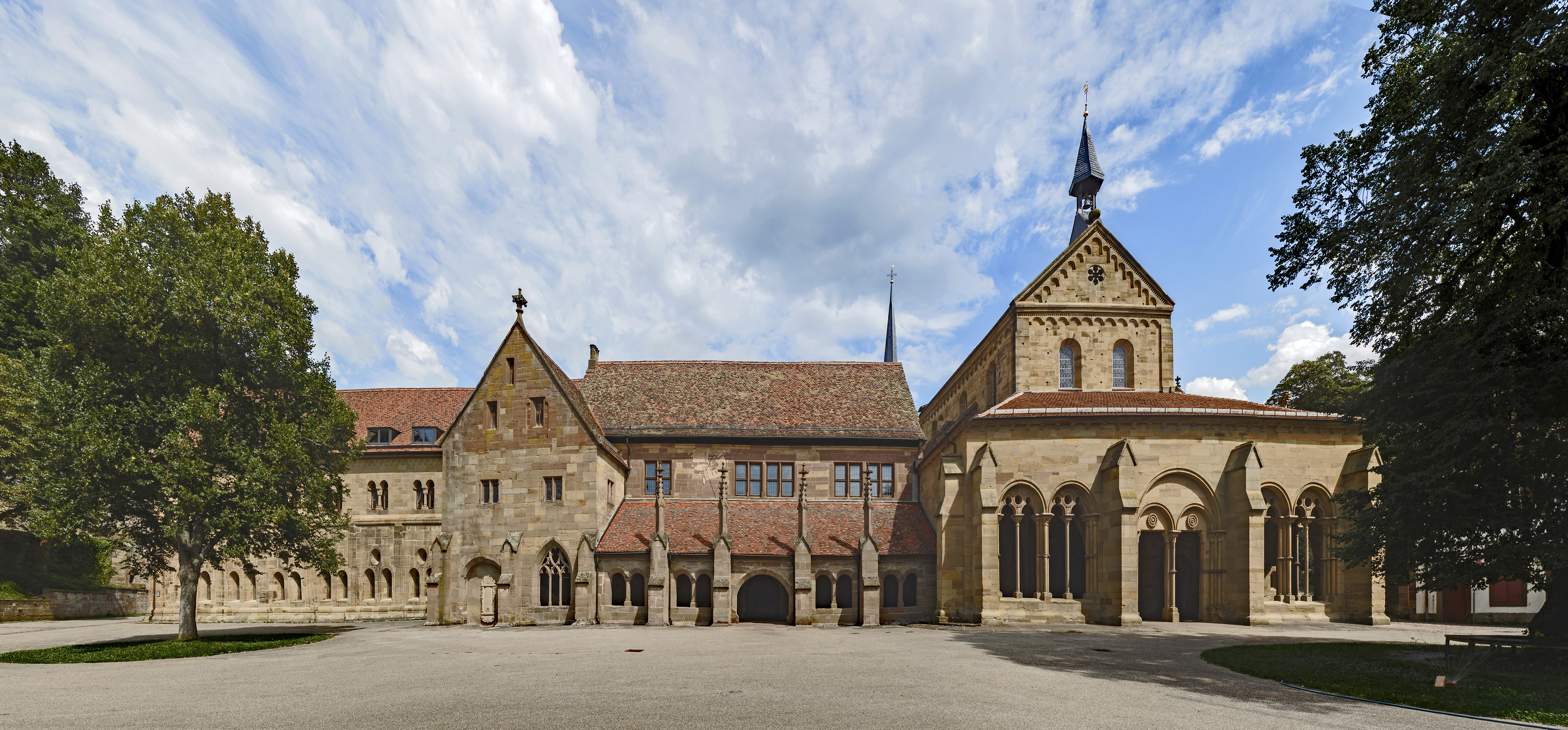
- Maulbronn Abbey, c. 2017

- Location within Germany Location within Baden-Württemberg

General information
- Location: Maulbronn, Germany
- Coordinates: 49°0′4″N 8°48′46″E

Website
- www.kloster-maulbronn.de

UNESCO World Heritage Site
- Official name: Maulbronn Monastery Complex
- Criteria: Cultural (ii), (iv)
- Reference: 546rev
- Inscription: 1993 (17th Session)

Maulbronn Monastery (German: Kloster Maulbronn) is a former Cistercian abbey and ecclesiastical state in the Holy Roman Empire located at Maulbronn, Baden-Württemberg. The monastery complex, one of the best-preserved in Europe, was named a UNESCO World Heritage Site in 1993.

The monastery was founded in 1147 and experienced rapid economic and political growth in the 12th century, but then hardship in the late 13th century and the 14th century. Prosperity returned in the 15th century and lasted until Maulbronn was annexed by the Duchy of Württemberg in 1504. Over the 16th century, the Cistercian monastery was dissolved and replaced with a Protestant seminary. It also became the seat of an important administrative district of the Duchy and later Kingdom of Württemberg.

The complex, surrounded by turreted walls and a tower gate, today houses the Maulbronn town hall and other administrative offices, and a police station. The monastery itself contains an Evangelical seminary and a boarding school.

== History ==
Imperial Monastery of Maulbronn Reichsabtei Maulbronn
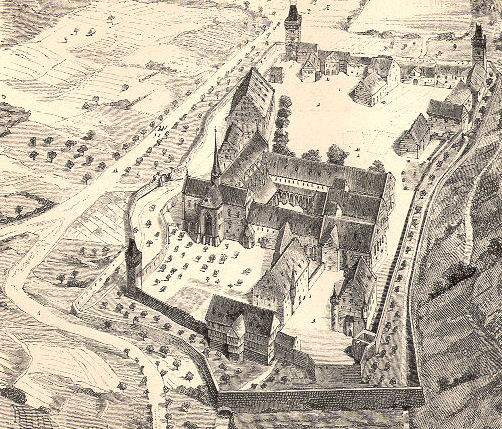
- Status: Imperial Abbey
- History
  - Abbey founded: 1147
  - Placed under Imperial protection: 1156
  - Annexed by Württemberg: 1504
Preceded by	Succeeded by
Bishopric of Speyer	Duchy of Württemberg

In 1138, a free knight named Walter von Lomersheim donated an estate at Eckenweiher (now Mühlacker) to the Cistercian Order for the establishment of a new monastery. The donation was received by Neubourg Abbey, which dispatched a party of 12 monks. They arrived in 1138, but found Eckenweiher to be lacking in water and pasture space. In 1147, the Eckenweiher monks were moved to a new site near the source of the Salzach river by the Bishop of Speyer, Günther von Henneberg. This site, Mulenbrunnen, about 8 kilometers (5.0 mi) from Eckenweiher, was ideal for the Cistercians. Located in the hilly Stromberg region, it was rich in water (Note: The etymology of the name "Mulenbrunnen," the root of Maulbronn, reveals that the monastery was likely founded at the site of a spring and a watermill.) and, though it was also near the Roman road running from Speyer to Cannstatt, was isolated. Construction of the Maulbronn Monastery complex began soon thereafter and was largely completed by 1200–01; the abbey church was consecrated in 1178 by Arnold I, Archbishop of Trier.

The new abbey at Maulbronn soon began a period of steady economic growth and legal security with the backing of both Bishop Henneberg, a supporter of the Cistericans and the Hohenstaufen, who were at the time the rulers of the Holy Roman Empire. In 1148, Bishop Henneberg waived Maulbronn's obligation to pay levies for the large amount of forest its monks had to clear and Pope Eugene III granted the monastery the right of patronage. Meanwhile, Maulbronn aggressively pursued the acquisition of new territory. In 1151, Maulbronn established Bronnbach Abbey, then acquired the Füllmenbacher and Elfinger farmsteads in 1152 and 1153 respectively, and then established Schöntal Abbey in 1157. Maulbronn has exempted from paying tithes and was made an Imperial Abbey by Emperor Frederick I in a 1156 that listed Maulbronn's possessions as comprising eleven farmsteads, portions of eight villages, and numerous vineyards. The monastery's holdings were again confirmed by Pope Alexander III in 1177; by then, Maulbronn owned seventeen farmsteads.

The 13th and 14th centuries were periods of strife for Maulbronn, though in the second half of the 13th century it was granted legal jurisdiction over its territories by Pope Alexander IV. Per the rules of the Cistercian Order, its lands had to be worked by its lay brothers. However, the number of lay brothers at Maulbronn dwindled over the 13th century, owing to conflict between them and the monks, and as a result the monastery increasingly relied on hired laborers to work its land. Around 1236, the House of Enzberg became Maulbronn's patrons and vögte, or protectors. There was persistent conflict with the Enzbergs, however, and one dispute in 1270 even saw the monastery temporarily suppressed. Emperor Charles IV transferred the vogtei of Maulbronn to the Electoral Palatinate in 1372, but this act drew the monastery into the power struggle between the Palatinate and the expanding County of Württemberg.

Prosperity returned to Maulbronn in the 15th century. Its abbots demonstrated the monastery's wealth in 1450, when it made easily the largest contribution of any Cistercian abbey that year to Cîteaux Abbey, the order's seat. In 1464, Maulbronn assumed the debts of Pairis Abbey in Alsace and incorporated it as a priory. Maulbronn also came to control the convents of Mariental, Rechtenshofen, Lichtenstern, Heilsbruck, and Koenigsbruck. The number of monks at Maulbronn peaked at one hundred thirty-five in the 1460s and only dipped below one hundred again at the end of the century. In 1492, Emperor Maximilian I withdrew the vogtei of Maulbronn from the Palatinate. Maximilian I additionally forbade any further fortification of the abbey, and ordered its existing works demolished.

=== Annexation by Württemberg ===
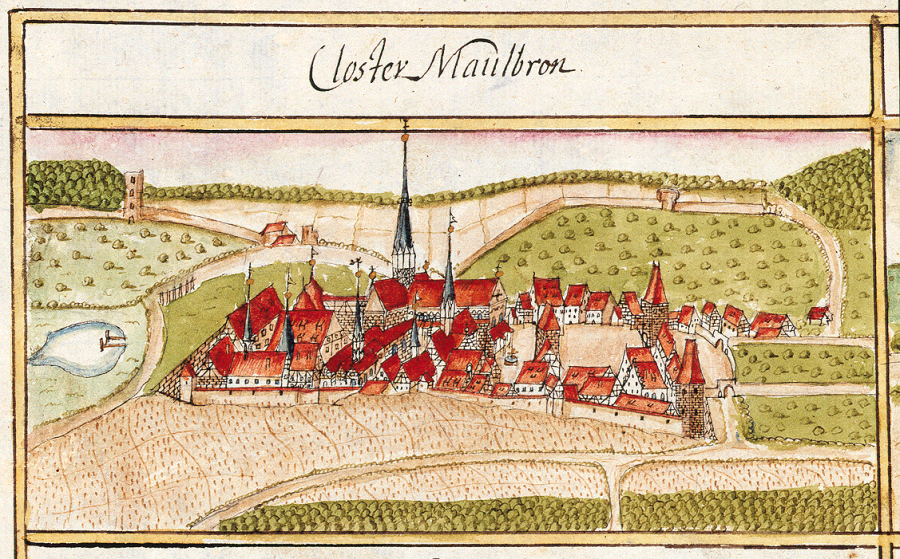
View of Maulbronn from the north in 1683 by Andreas Kieser

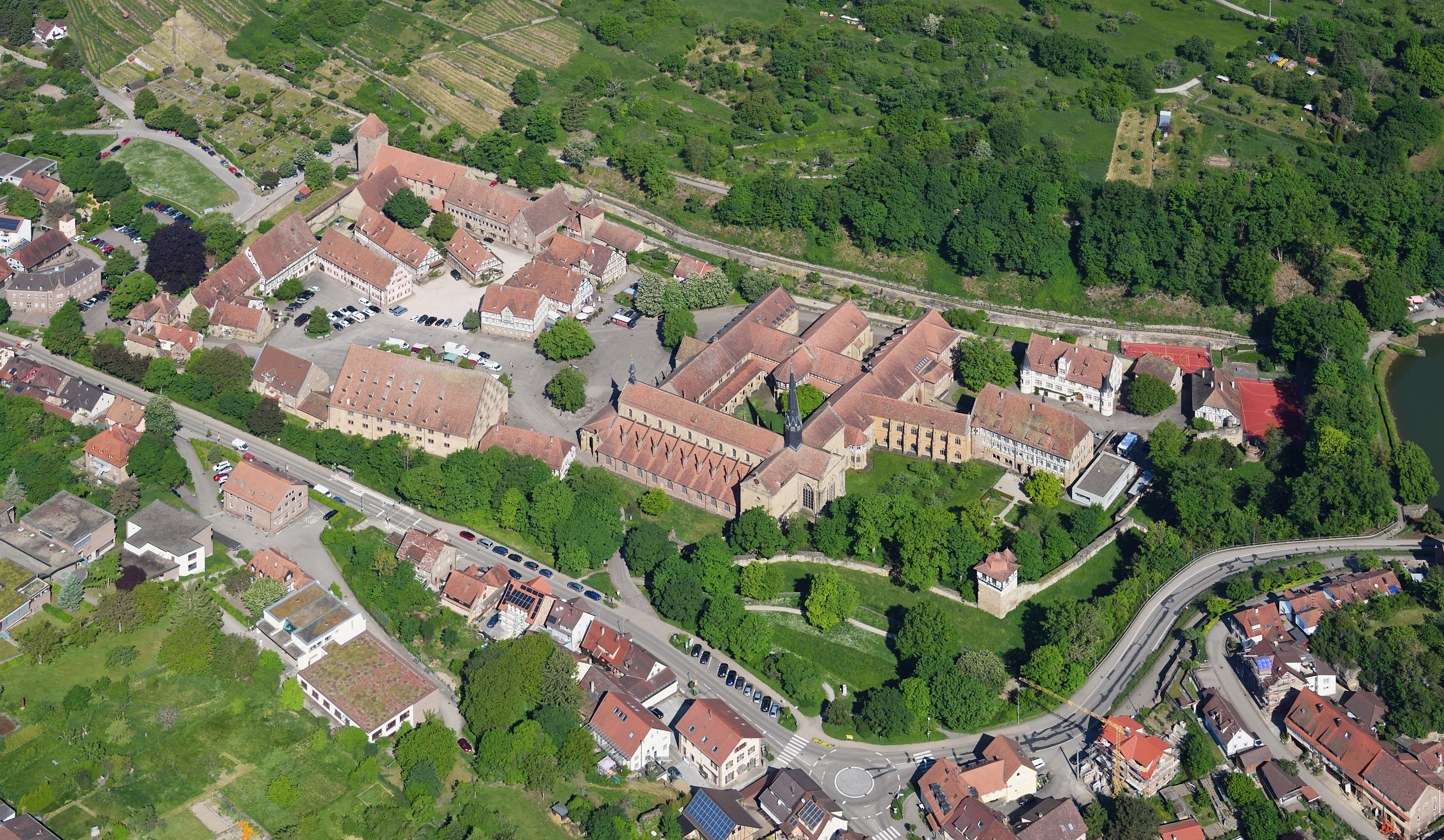
Aerial view of the Maulbronn Monastery Complex from the southeast

In 1504, during the War of the Succession of Landshut, Ulrich, Duke of Württemberg took Maulbronn after a seven-day siege. Ulrich subsequently had Maulbronn's vogtei transferred to him, effectively annexing the monastery and its territories into the Duchy of Württemberg. In 1525, the monastery was occupied by peasants participating in the German Peasants' War in 1525 and the monks were expelled.

Duke Ulrich adopted the Lutheran faith in 1534, and subsequently ordered the dissolution of all monasteries within Württemberg's territories, and seized their properties. Maulbronn was the sole exception to this order, as it was to host monks expelled from other monasteries. In 1536, Maulbronn's abbot relocated to Pairis and the next year began legal action to reclaim Maulbronn. The Imperial Diet of the Holy Roman Empire decided in the Cistercians' favor at the 1548 Augsburg Interim, which followed the defeat of Ulrich and the other Protestant princes in the Schmalkaldic War. Ulrich was ordered to restore the Württemberg's monasteries and convents and, though he tried to delay their restoration, the Cistercians returned to Maulbronn in 1548. After the 1555 Peace of Augsburg restored religious peace in the Empire, however, Christoph, Duke of Württemberg was able to fully reform the Duchy.

In 1556, Christoph reformed the monasteries. Following a program created by one of his advisors, Johannes Brenz, he established Protestant seminaries in thirteen of Württemberg's monasteries. Maulbronn's holdings were absorbed into the Duchy and organized into a new administrative district. A Protestant Valentin Vannius, a former monk at Maulbronn, was appointed abbot and thus the head of Maulbronn's seminary in 1558.

Two Lutheran colloquys were held at Maulbronn, in 1564 and 1576.

The Thirty Years' War forced the monastery school to close until 1656.

During the Nine Years War, Maulbronn was part of the defensive network of the Eppingen lines, built from 1695 to 1697 by Louis William, Margrave of Baden-Baden.

In the later years of the 17th century, Duke Louis III tasked his court architect, Georg Beer, with renovating the monastery for the seminary. In that time, Louis III had a hunting lodge built on the monastery grounds, likely designed by Beer.

=== Secularization and preservation ===
Maulbronn Monastery was finally secularized by King Frederick I in 1806.

Efforts to preserve and restore the medieval character of the monastery complex began in 1840.

The monastery school was taken over by the Nazi Party in 1941. It was reopened in 1945–46.

=== Tourism ===
The Paradise and the fountain in the lavatorium appear on the 2013 German Bundesländer series 2 euro coin. 30 million of these coins were minted in Berlin, Munich, Stuttgart, Karlsruhe, and Hamburg. An average of 235,000 persons visit the monastery each year as of 2019.

== Grounds and architecture ==
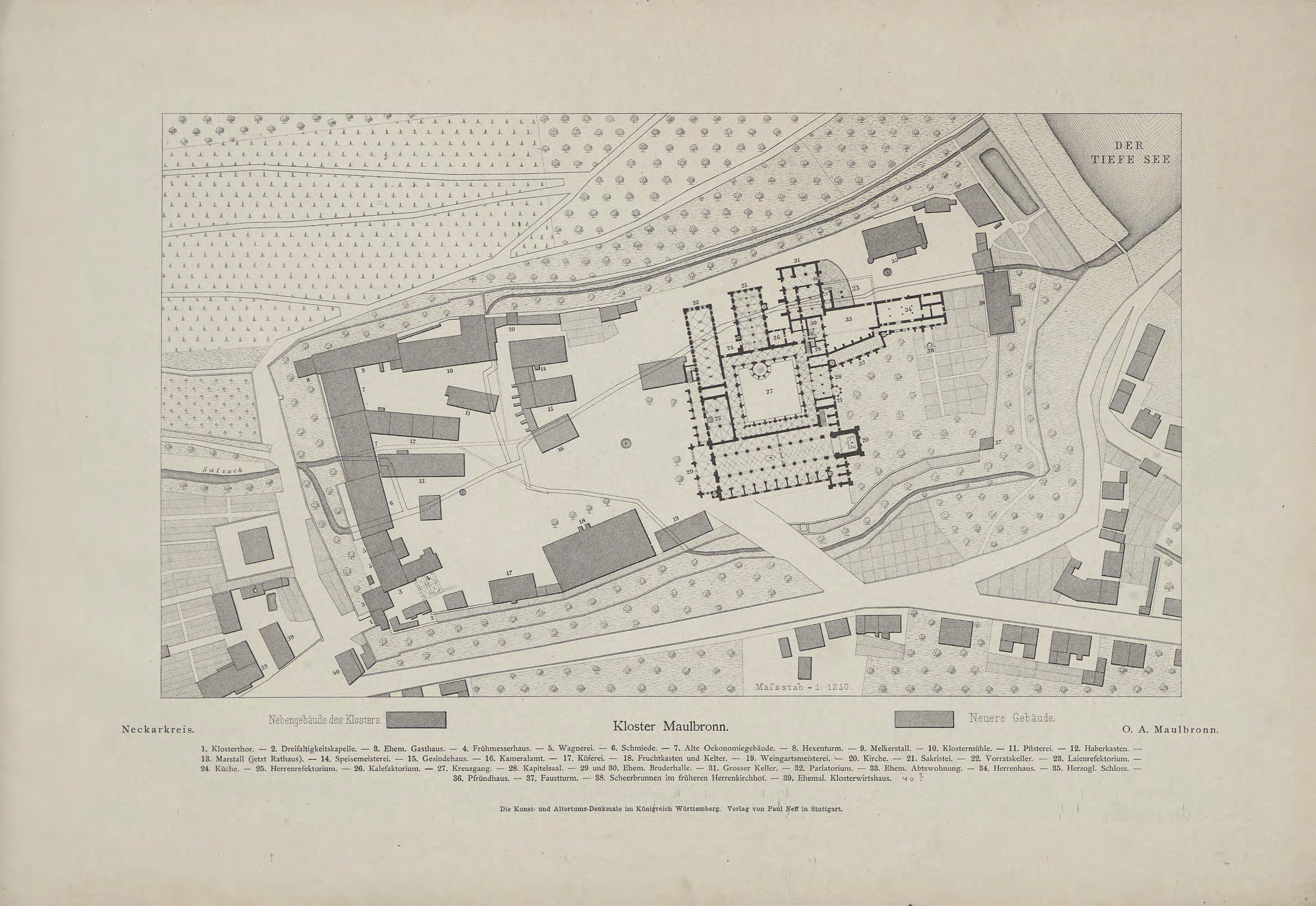
Map of the monastery complex

The architectural history of the Maulbronn Monastery complex is still not fully understood. The monastery was constructed in the 12th century in a Romanesque style, though little of the 12th century work – the portal and its original doors – has been preserved. The specific style used, called the "Hirsau style", was native to Swabia and is characterized by uniform pillars and the rectangular frames around the Romanesque arches. Near the end of the 12th century the architecture of the Cistercians became influenced by Gothic architecture, and the order began disseminating it from northeastern France. From 1210 to 1220, an anonymous architect trained in Paris erected the first example of Gothic architecture in Germany at Maulbronn's narthex, the southern portion of its cloister, and the monks' refectory. (Note: This architect is thought from his mason's mark, a half-moon, to have also worked on Walkenried Abbey, Ebrach Abbey, and Magdeburg Cathedral.) The Late Gothic came to Maulbronn from the late 13th century to the mid-14th century, and again in the German Romantic era of the late 19th century. There is a very limited amount of Renaissance architecture at Maulbronn, represented primarily by Duke Ludwig's hunting manor.

The monastery as a whole survives due mostly to the Dukes of Württemberg.

The monastery was protected by a stone wall, a drawbridge gate, and five towers. The origins of these structures is in the 13th century.

=== Western courtyard ===
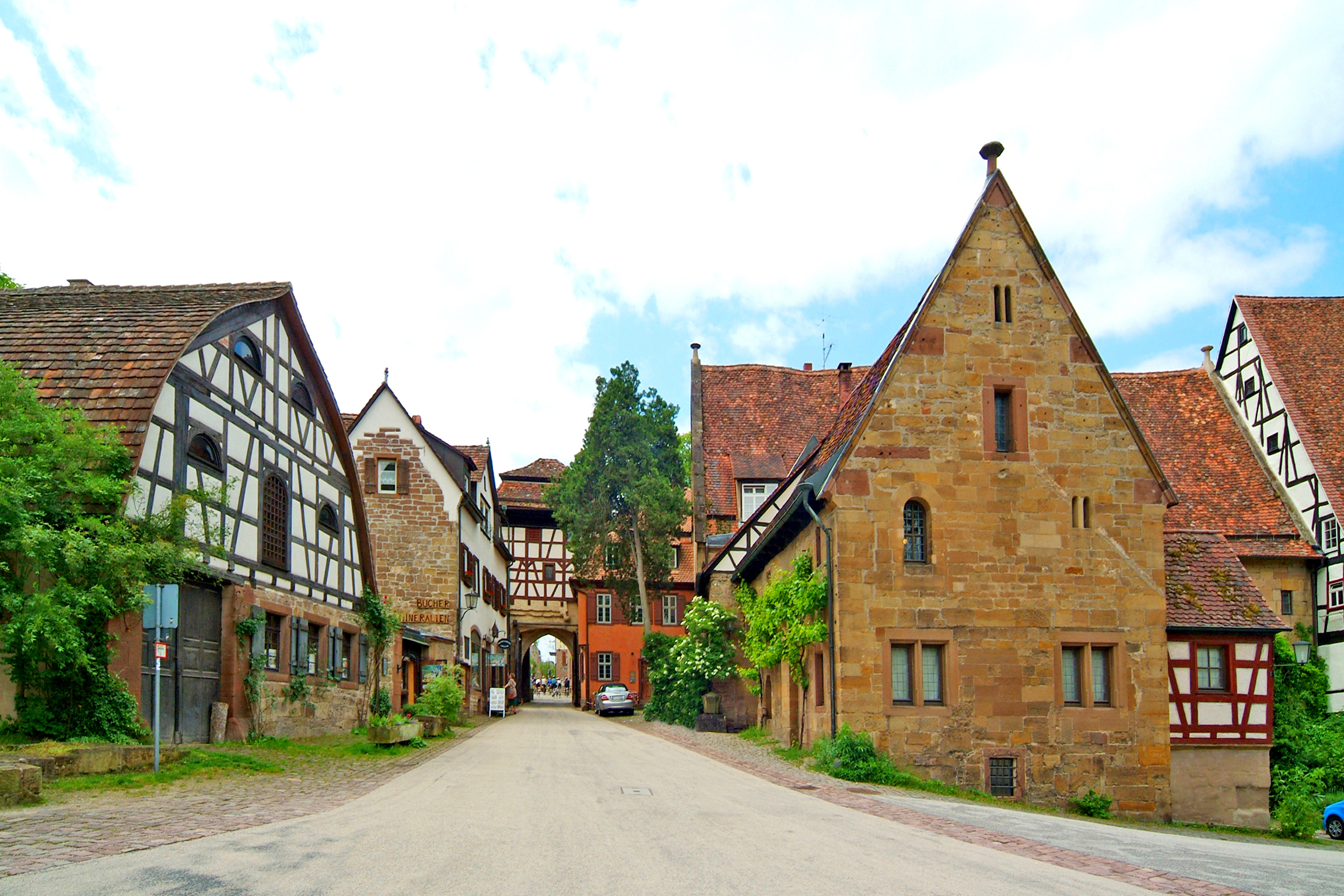
Entrance area, western courtyard

The complex is still entered through the gatehouse, at its southwest corner, though the drawbridge is no longer present. The half-timber building on the back of the gatehouse was built around 1600 and the roof in 1751. Just behind the gatehouse are the pharmacy, originally an inn, and the residence of the monk responsible for giving early morning mass to guests at the monastery. The interior of the building is divided into a large, open fireplace and the entrance hall. Attached to the pharmacy is a 19th-century carriage house, now a museum, that stands on top of a chapel built around 1480. The foundations of the chapel's choir are still extant behind the carriage house, as are the remains of a Romanesque gate demolished in 1813. A lead pipe found here suggests that there used to be a well nearby. East of the gate is the Fruchtkasten, today a concert hall. It was built in the 13th century and then totally rebuilt and enlarged in 1580 for the storage and use of wine-making equipment.

To the north of the gate is the monastery's administrative and economic buildings. Along the western wall of the monastery are what used to be the blacksmithy and wheelwright's workshops. East of the blacksmith is the former mews, which has been Maulbronn's city hall since the early 19th century. The building was converted in 1600 from its original Gothic appearance into the present Renaissance style structure. Just north of the city hall is the Haberkasten, used as a granary, and adjacent to that is the workplace and residence of the monastery's chief baker. Finally, there are three half-timber buildings. The first is the Speisemeisterei, next to the sawmill, and the third is the Bursarium, built in 1742 as the cemetery office but used as a police station and notary as of 2019. The middle building, built in 1550, was a servant's quarters.

=== Abbey ===
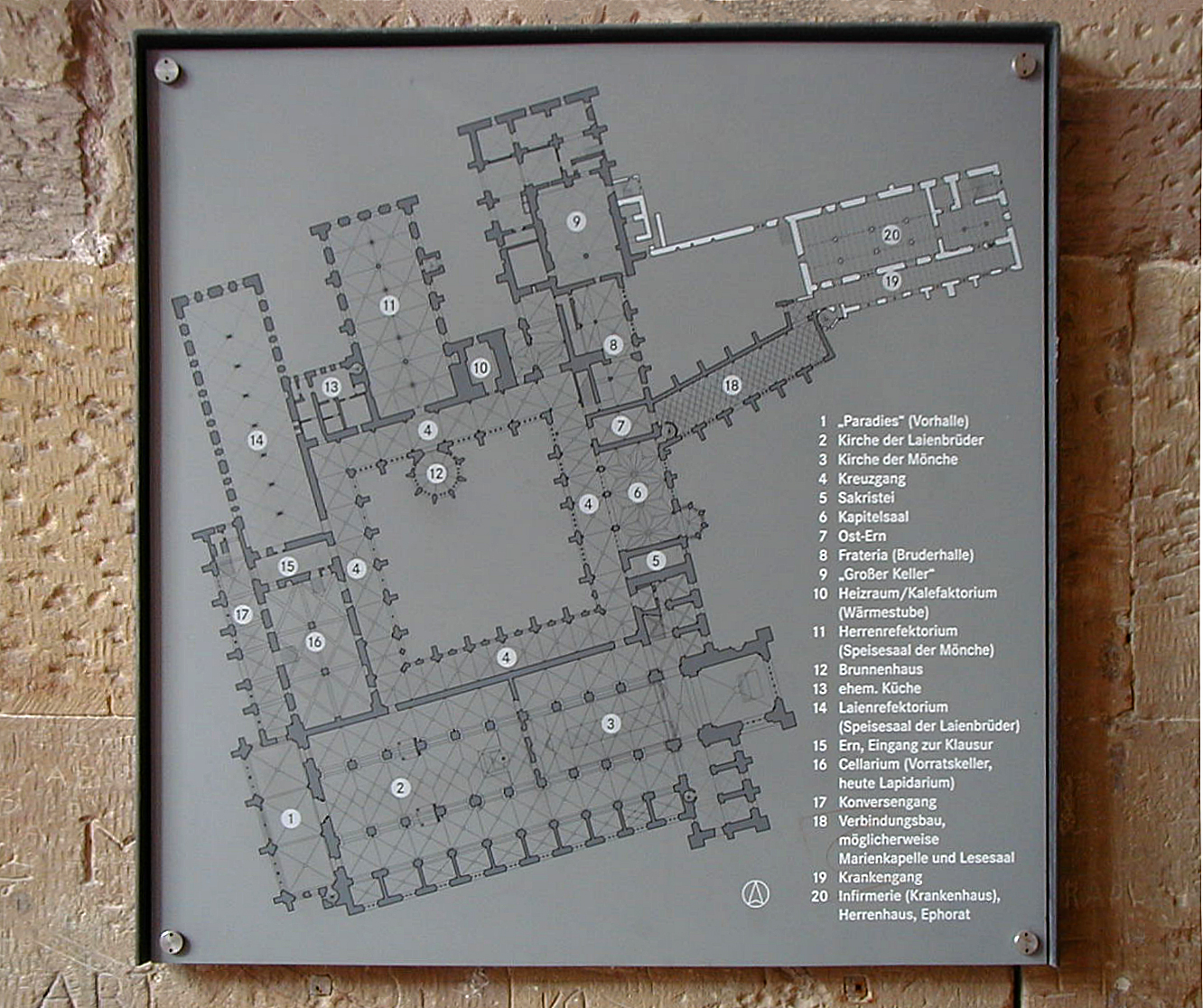
Plan of the monastery. In English: 1. Paradise, 2. Lay brothers' Church, 3. Monks' church, 4. Cloister, 5. Sacristy, 6. Chapter house, 7 and 15. Corridors, 8. Frateria, 9. Great cellar, 10. Calefactory, 11. Monk's refectory, 12. Lavatorium, 13. Kitchen, 14. Lay brother's refectory, 15. Cloister entryway, 16. Cellarium, 17. Lay brothers' passage, 18. Corridor building, 19 and 20. Hospital

At the center of the monastery complex is the abbey, where the monks and lay brothers lived and prayed. The monastery had strict divisions between the two groups. This was so even in the church, which is divided into sections for the former and the latter by a choir wall. There are two ciboriums, decorated with toads, lizards, and skulls and a number of medieval works on both sides of the choir wall. In front of this wall on the lay brother's side is a large image of Christ crucified, carved around 1473 from a single block of stone. At the end of the lay brother's section is the organ, installed by Gerhard Grenzing in 2013. In the choir is a Madonna and Child, the Maulbronner Madonna, crafted sometime between 1307 and 1317. In the chancel below is the abbot's chair and a set of choir stalls providing seating for 92 monks. They were carved around 1450 by an unknown master, possibly Hans Multscher, who covered them in biblical scenes and mythical creatures. The frescoes within the church depict the Adoration of the Magi, the entrance of Maulbronn's founder Walter von Lomersheim into the monastery as a lay brother. Also present are the coats of arms of nobles who donated to the monastery's construction. The donor chapels, built within rather than outside the church, and vaulted Gothic roof, replacing the original flat and timber roof, were added when the church was renovated in the late 15th century. The altar, likely of South German make, depicts the Passion of Jesus and was once gilded and painted. Those pieces of the set that remain have since 1978 sat on a sandstone slab in the chapel.

The church's narthex is Germany's oldest example of Gothic architecture – the "Paradise", built around 1220. The portal into the lay brothers' church contain the oldest datable doors in Germany, fashioned from fir wood in 1178. The door was decorated with wrought iron and parchment that would have been glued onto the door and painted red. Immediately north of the abbey church is the cloister, the southern portion of which was built by the Master of the Paradise's workshop from 1210 to 1220. Lay brothers could enter or leave the cloister from a corridor on its west side. This leads to a flight of stairs to the lay brothers' dormitory, and the lay refectory on the ground floor. The groin vaults are supported by seven slender double-column pillars installed in 1869. Opposite the corridor to the cloister from the lay refectory is the cellarium, now a display of stonemasonry paraphernalia.

On the north side of the cloister is the lavatorium, where monks washed before meals and for ablution. The majority of the fountain within dates to 1878; only the base bowl is original. The five Gothic windows were added from 1340 to 1350 and the half-timber structure above the lavatorium was built around 1611 in a style similar to that of Heinrich Schickhardt. The vaults of the lavatorium were painted with a depiction of Maulbronn's founding myth. Across from the fountain house is the monks' refectory, where the full brothers ate their meals and listened to a reading of the Bible. This building was possibly also built by the Master of the Paradise, as evidenced by the Early Gothic elements of its interior. The ribbing of the vaults was painted red in the 16th century. The kitchen that supplied the two refectories is located between them, but arranged such to keep smoke and odors away from the rest of the monastery.

Although the Cistercian Order banned heated rooms, Maulbronn has a calefactory that was heated by lighting a fire in a vaulted chamber underneath the calefactory. Smoke was funneled outside and the heat rose into the calefactory through the 20 holes in its floor. It was the only heated room in the monastery.

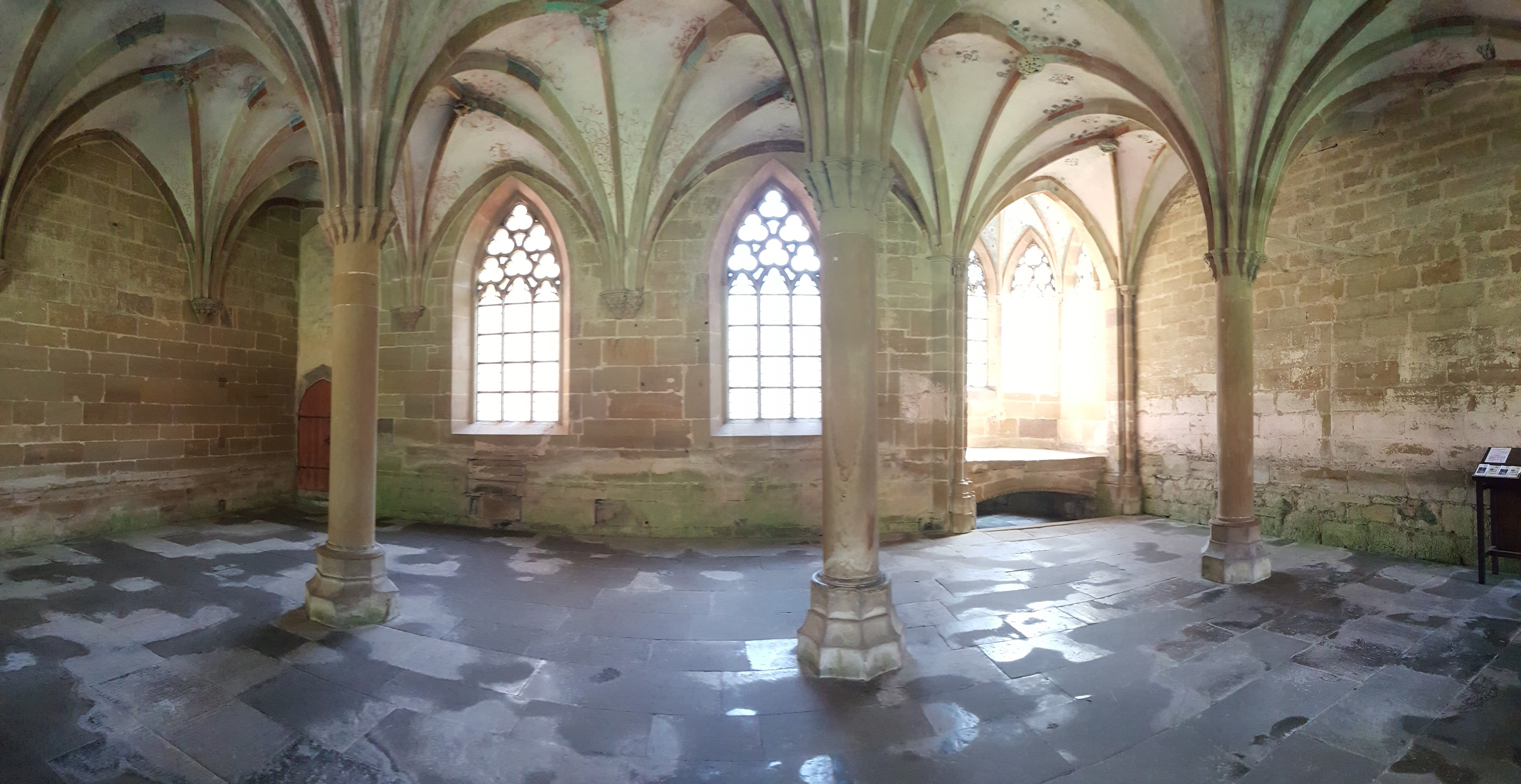
Chapter house, east wall

Attached to the center of the eastern side of the cloister is the chapter house, where monks could break their oaths of silence. Three pillars hold up the room's star vaults, which are clad in red frescoes from 1517. One of the captstones for the pillars depicts, unusually, eight eagles. The keystones of the vaults depict the Four Evangelists, the Lamb of God, and an angel blowing a trumpet. At the southeast corner of the chapter house is a small chapel in a bay window.

A staircase on the east side of the cloister leads to the monks' dormitory.

A corridor on the eastern side of the cloister goes to a Late Gothic connecting building, built by lay brother Conrad von Schmie, leading to the monastery hospital, the Ephorat. The connecting building is decorated with a mural depicting Benedict of Nursia and Bernard of Clairvaux kneeling before the Virgin Mary. From the symbolism, it is thought this space was used as a Marian chapel, a scriptorium, or a library. After Maulbronn's acquisition by the Dukes of Württemberg, the hospital was renovated as the abbot's residence and gained its name from the abbot's title, "Ephorus".

=== Eastern courtyard ===
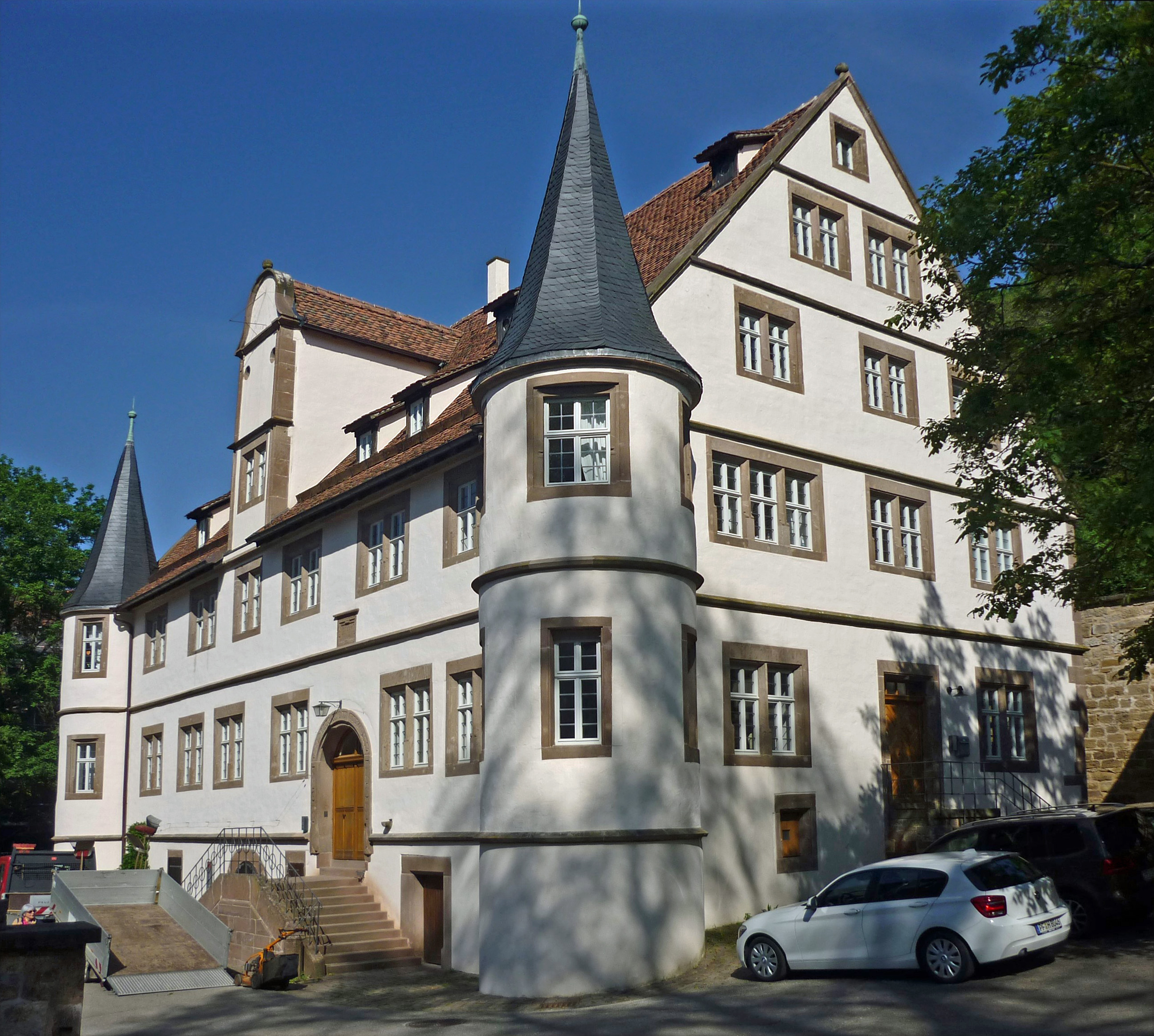
Duke Louis III's hunting lodge.

In 1588, Duke Louis III built a lustschloss over the cellar of an earlier building, likely the abbot's residence. During the existence of the Oberamt Maulbronn, Louis III's lustschloss was its administrative office. Nearby are the ruins of the Pfründhaus, where donors who had bought a life pension from the monastery resided. The building was erected in 1430 and used as a poorhouse in the 19th century until it was destroyed by fire in January 1892.

In the southeast corner of the complex is the Faustturm, the tower where Johann Georg Faust is alleged to have lived while staying at the monastery in 1516.

=== Water system ===
As was customary with Cistercian monasteries, Maulbronn stands on top of a sophisticated water management system. By draining the wetlands around the monastery and digging a series of canals, the monks created some 20 ponds and lakes. A local stream, the Salzach, was diverted to flow under the monastery to form its sewerage. The water levels in these lakes could be controlled, allowing Maulbronn's monks to power their mill, but also to raise fish and eels. (Note: Cistercians were forbidden from eating meat, but consuming fish was allowable as they were classified as "river vegetables." Maulbronn's monks raised fish, especially mirror carp, in different bodies of water depending on their species, size, and age, and then sold them to surrounding communities.) In one of these ponds, the Aalkistensee, the monks could raise up to 5000 carp. Much of the system remains in use and is part of Maulbronn's UNESCO inscription. The water system has been under study by Baden-Württemberg's Office for the Preservation of Monuments since 1989.

=== Museums ===
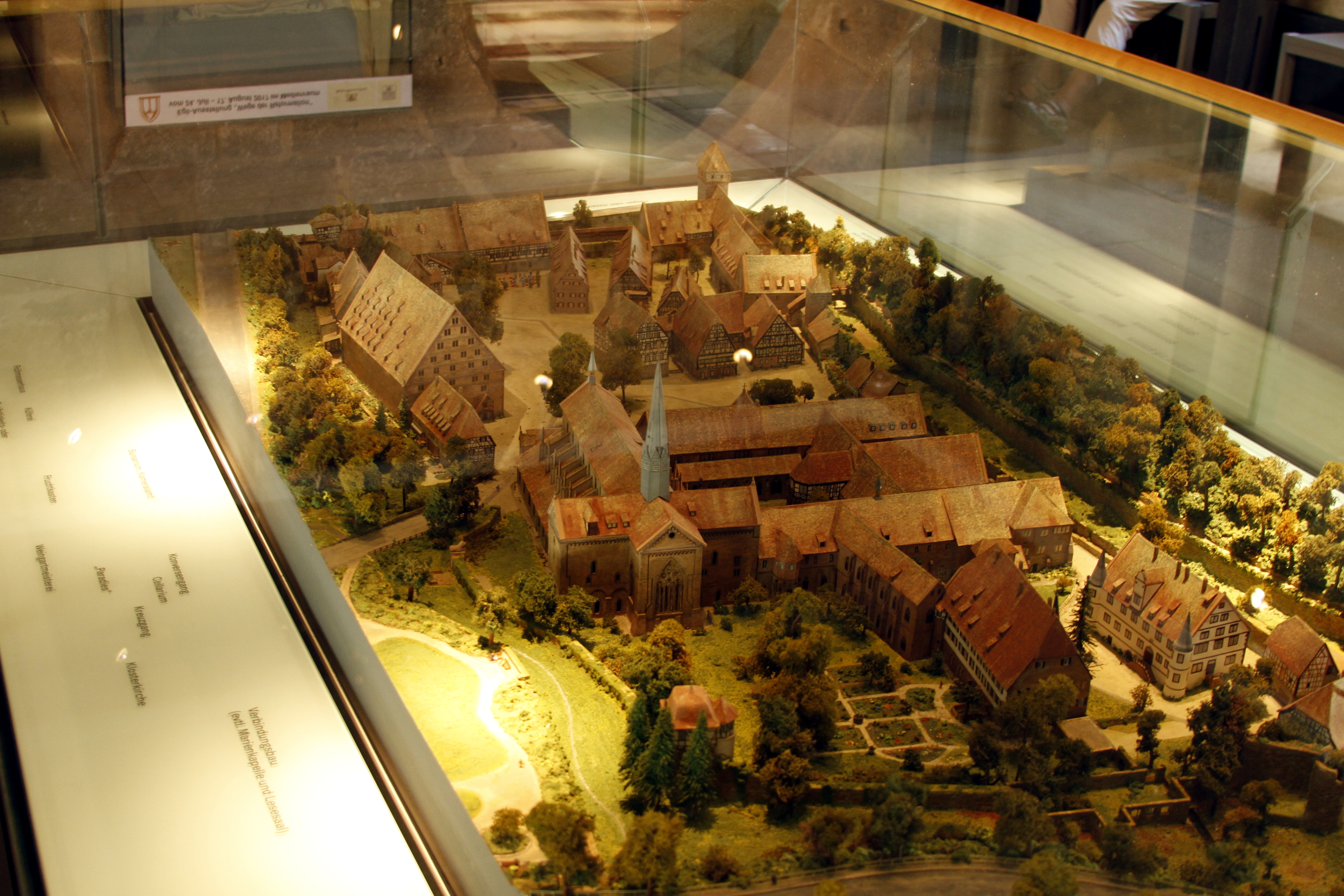
Scale model of the monastery complex in the monastery museum

The cooperage, near the gatehouse, is the visitor center. On the ground floor is a diorama of the monastery complex and on the second floor is a museum room detailing post-monastic life at Maulbronn. The nearby Frühmesserhaus displays a three-panel display made by the monks of Maulbronn documenting its foundation and attached circumstances.

Within the monastery complex is a three-part literary museum, "Besuchen-Bilden-Schreiben", operated by the state of Baden-Württemberg. The first of these, "Visit" exhibits Maulbronn's image in literature. Next is "Learn", dedicated to the monastery's use as a Protestant seminary and with a focus on alumni of the seminary such as Johannes Kepler, Friedrich Hölderlin, and Hermann Hesse. Finally, "Write" showcases the works of the monks at Maulbronn and a library spanning 800 years and 50 writers.

The abbey's cellarium houses a lapidarium and exhibit detailing the construction methods used at Maulbronn.

=== School ===
The ancient quarters now house a boarding school, the Evangelische Seminar Maulbronn, operated by the Evangelical-Lutheran Church in Württemberg.

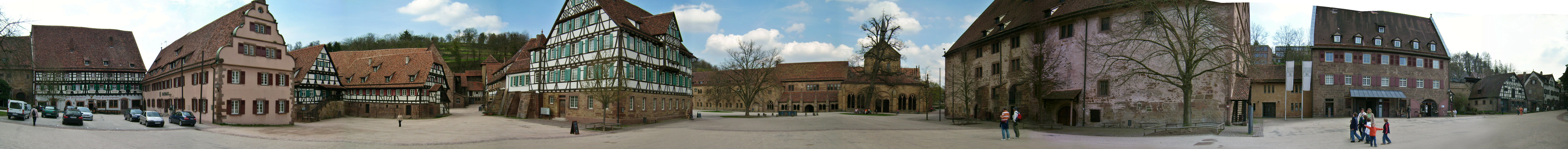
Panorama photograph of Maulbronn Monastery's western courtyard, facing the abbey

== Maps ==
Maulbronn Monastery
Kloster Maulbronn
1 Church
2 Cellarium (storage cellar)
3 Kreuzganggarten (cloister garden)
4 Ephorat
5 Faustturm (tower)
6 Mühlturm (mill tower)
7 Speisemeisterei (food mastery)
8 Police station (former Bursarium)
9 Mühle (mill)
10 Eichelboden Melkstall (milking barn)
11 Haspelturm (tower)
12 Speicher (storage)
13 Haberkasten
14 Schmiede (forge)
15 Gasthaus (guest house)
16 Klostertor (gate)
17 Küferei (cooperage)
18 Stadthalle (town hall, former mews)
19 Weingartmeisterei (vineyard mastery)

== Abbots ==
List of Catholic Abbots of Maulbronn

- 1138-c.1178 Diether
- c.1216–1219 Conrad I
- 1232 Gozwin
- 1234–1243 Sigfrid I
- 1244–1251 Berthold I Munt
- 1253 H.(einrich I)?
- 1254 Gottfrid
- 1257–1268 Egenhard
- 1268 Albrecht I
- 1276–1277 Hildebrand
- 1280 Walther
- 1281–1285 Sigfrid II
- 1287–1292 Rudolf
- 1294–1299 Conrad II
- 1302–1305 Reinhard
- c.1306 Albrecht II
- before 1313 Wilent
- 1313–1325 Heinrich II von Calw
- 1330–1353 Conrad III von Thalheim
- c.1358 Berthold II Kuring
- c.1359 Ulrich von Ensingen
- 1361–1367 Johannes I von Rottweil
- 1376–1383 Albrecht III von Rieringen
- 1383 Marquard
- 1384–1402 Heinrich III von Renningen
- 1402–1428 Albrecht IV von Detisheim
- 1428–1430 Gerung von Wildberg
- 1430–1439 Johann II von Gelnhausen
- 1439–1445 Johann III von Worms
- 1445–1462 Berthold II von Roßwag
- 1462–1467 Johann IV von Wimsheim
- 1467–1472 Nikolaus von Bretten
- 1472–1475 Albrecht V
- 1475-c.1488 Johann V von Laudenburg
- 1488–1491 Stephan Detinger
- 1491–1503 Johann VI von Bretten (1st reign)
- 1503–1504 Johann VII von Umbstadt
- 1504–1512 Michael Scholl von Baihingen
- 1512–1518 Johannes VIII Entenfuß
- 1518–1521 Johann VI von Bretten (2nd reign)
- 1521–1547 Johannes IX von Lienzingen
- 1547–1557 Heinrich IV von Nördlingen
- 1557 Johannes X Epplin von Waiblingen

(1558–1630 Württemberger Lutheran administrators)

- 1630–1642 Christoph Schaller von Sennheim
- 1642–1648 Bernhardin Buchinger von Kiensheim

(1648 Württemberg control restored)

== See also ==
- List of Cistercian monasteries
- Salem Abbey
- Heiligkreuztal Monastery
