= Baiselsberg =

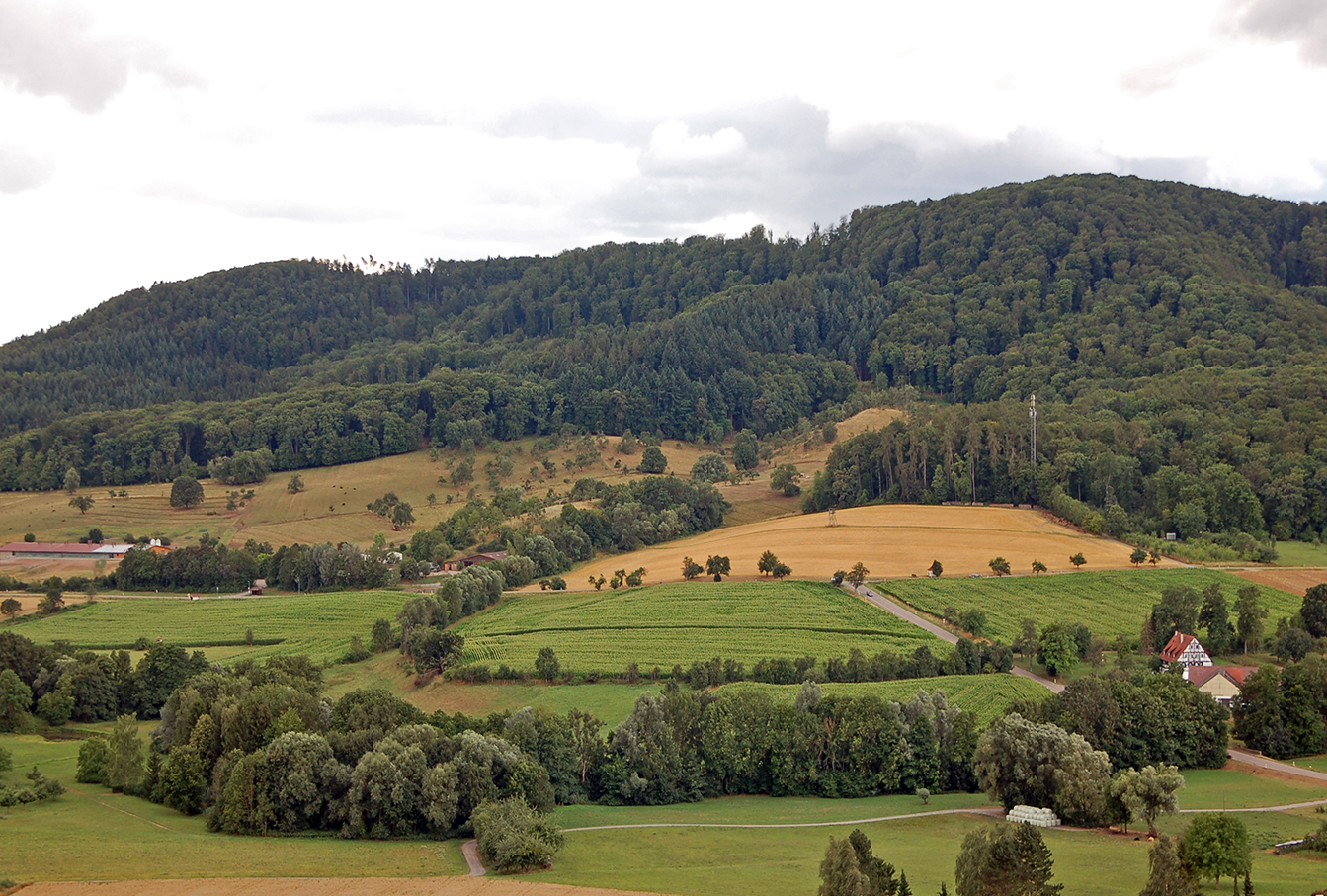
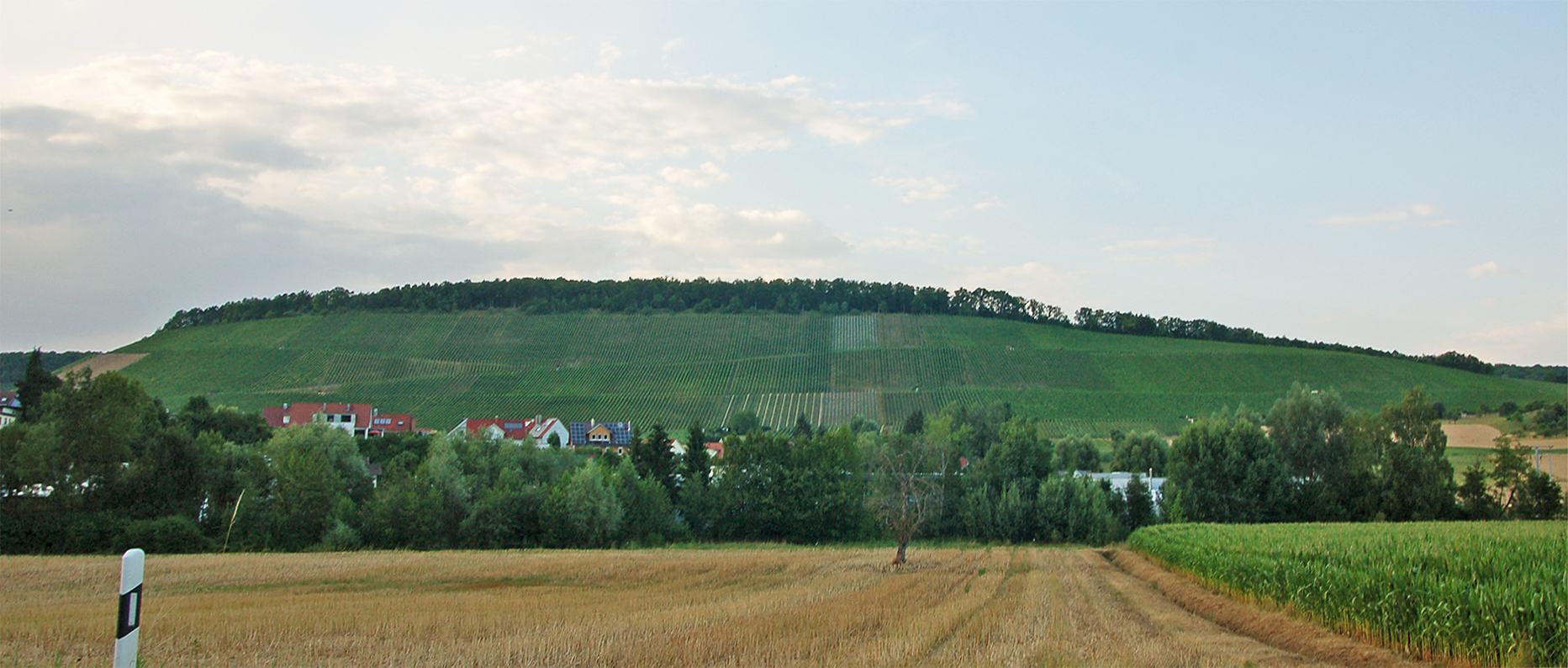
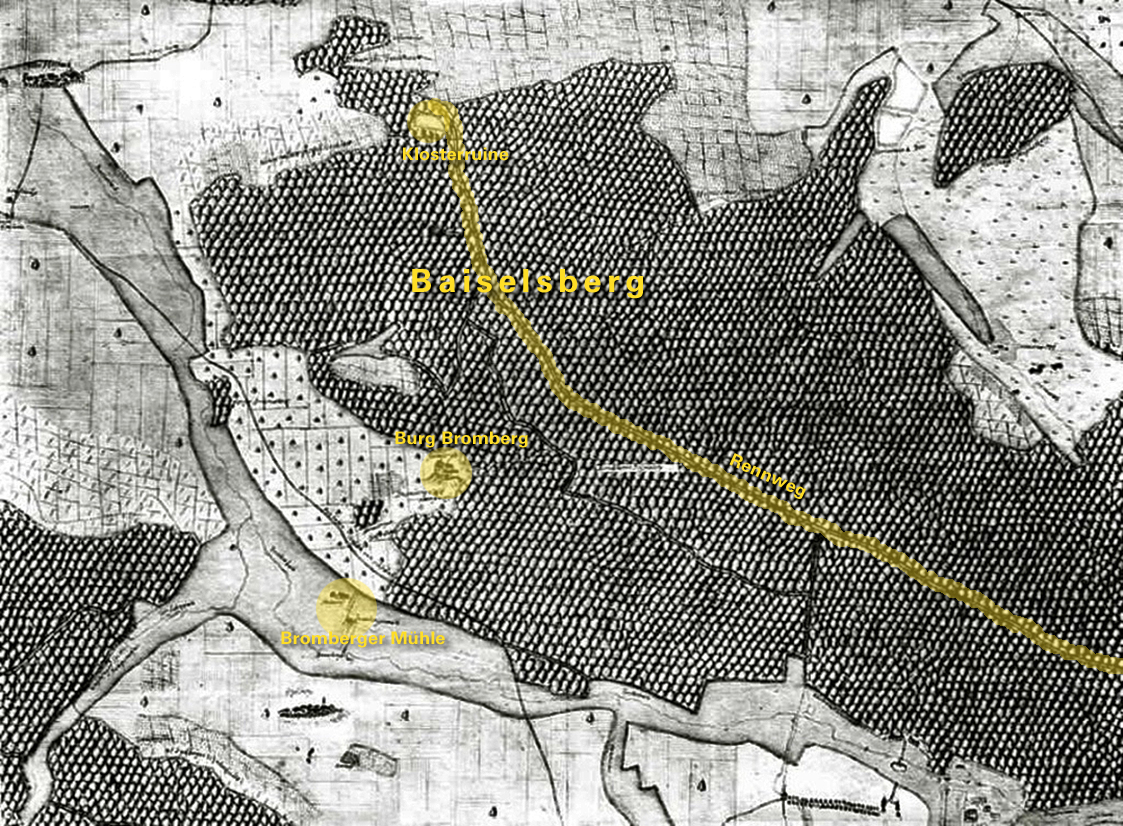
- Northern hillside with the Bromberg Forest and castle site (c) Southern hillside with vineyards above Horrheim The Baiselsberg and Bromberg Castle, the mill and the Rennweg on forest map No. 98 of 1684

Highest point
- Elevation: 476.6 m above sea level (NN) (1,564 ft)
- Coordinates: 49°00′14″N 8°59′18″E

Geography
- Location within Baden-Württemberg
- Location: Sachsenheim, Ludwigsburg, Baden-Württemberg, Germany
- Parent range: Stromberg

The Baiselsberg in the district of Ludwigsburg in Germany lies within the Stromberg-Heuchelberg Nature Park and, at 476.6 m above NN, is the highest point of the Stromberg region.

== Geography ==
The northeastern half of the ridge was once part of the parishes of Ochsenbach and Hohenhaslach, but since the municipal reform in Baden-Wurttemberg it has become part of Sachsenheim. The southwestern half belonged to parish of Horrheim, but is now part of Vaihingen an der Enz.

The plateau, which was formed as a result of inverted relief processes, and the slopes that descend from the west to the east and north, are mostly wooded and include the Großen Fleckenwald and Bromberg Forest (Bromberger Wald). The less steeply descending eastern slope is called the Hummelberg. Vineyards grace the steep southern slopes above Horrheim where the land has been cleared. The elongated ridge of Baiselsberg was carved out by the Kirbach stream in the north and the Metter in the south. Further southeast of the spur of Baiselsberg, the Kirbach flows from the northwest and empties into the west-east flowing Metter at Sachsenheim which eventually discharges into the River Enz at Bietigheim.

== Historical relics ==
Over the summit, which lies in the municipality of Sachsenheim, runs a hiking trail, by which is a sign that says it is "the highest point in the Stromberg". Part of it runs along a former Rennweg, that lead from the southeastern foot of the Baiselsberg towards Sternenfels. Around the summit itself are other historical relics:

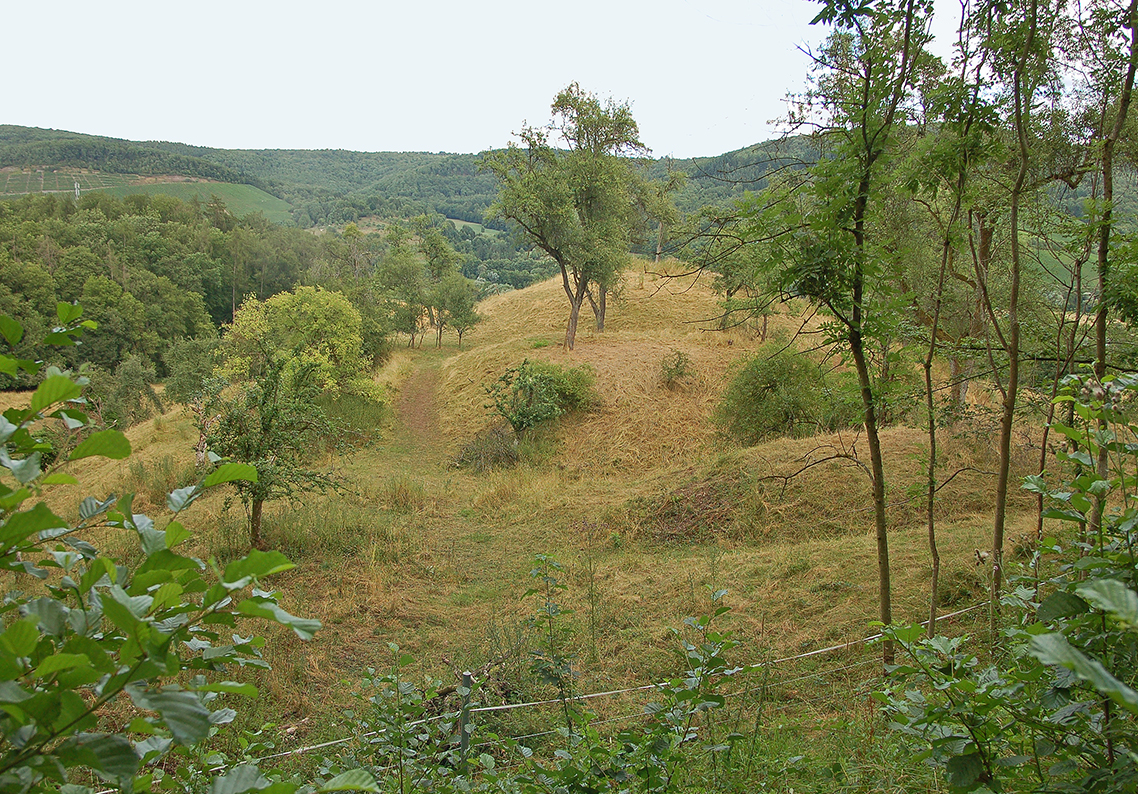
The burgstall of Bromberg Castle

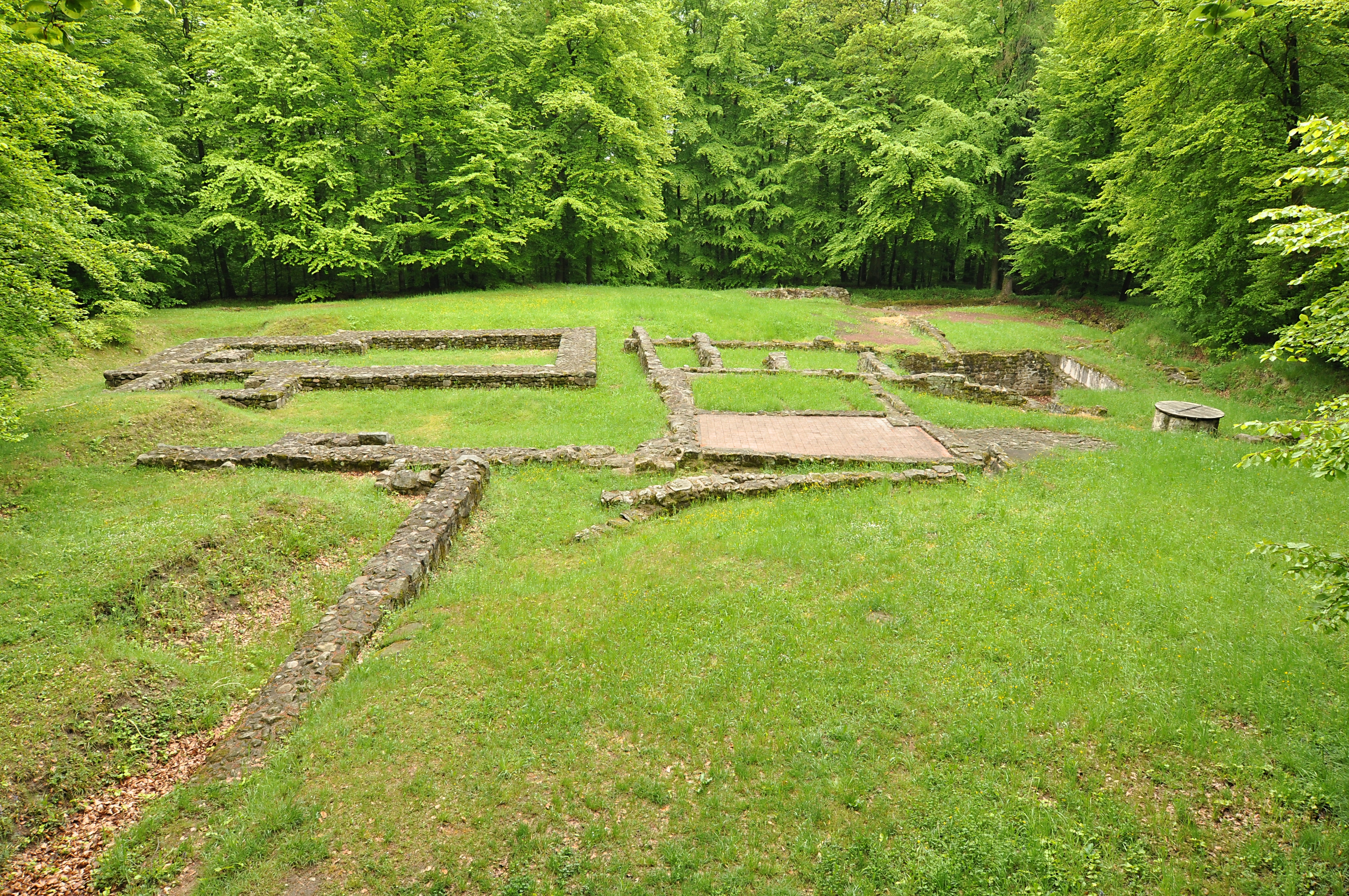
Foundations of the convent

On a spur of the northern hillside in the open field system of Schlössle is the burgstall of Bromberg Castle, built around 1200 by the edelfrei lords of Bromberg and which was reduced to ground level in 1824. Downhill can still be relics of the former castle hamlet guess Bromberg on Kirbach, 'of which only the first mentioned in the 12th century' 'Bromberg mill' remained.

About 300 metres south of the burgstall in a klinge running off to the northeast is the little settlement of Kelterle, which was laid out in the 19th century, clearly on the site of an older settlement. Since then, it has come to house an orphanage was home and now serves the judicial authorities.

About 500 metres south of the highest point in a clearing in the municipality of Vaihingen are the restored foundations of the convent of Baiselsberg, which was abandoned during the Reformation and subsequently demolished.

At the Heidenkopf on the southwestern hillside, prehistoric relics consisting of exceptionally large boulders have survived, that escaped the usual secondary exploitation, probably due to their weight. Speculation that they are evidence of a megalithic culture that is, as yet unknown in southern Germany, has been rejected by the Baden-Württemberg State Conservation Office.
