= Walter von Lomersheim =

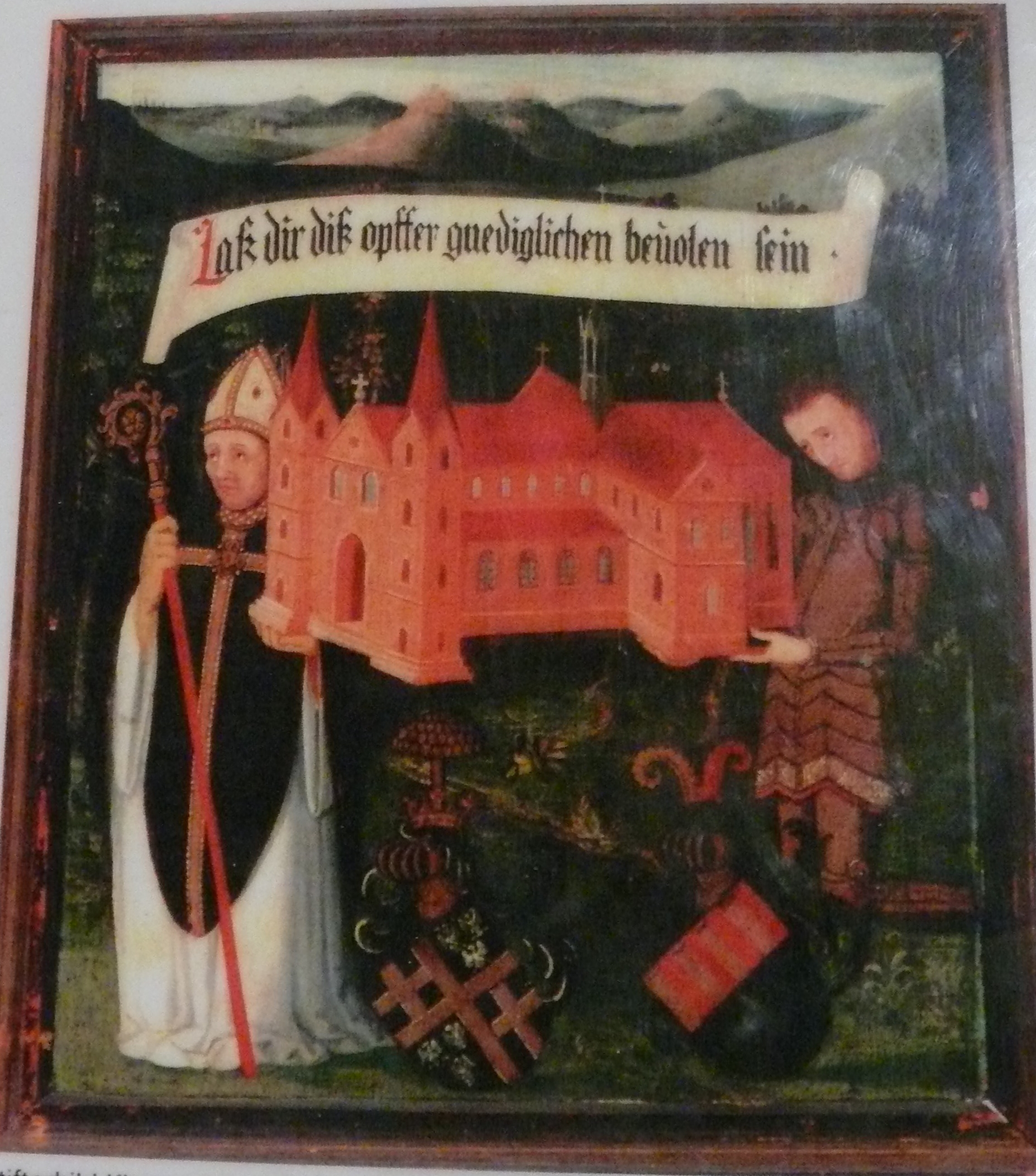
- Walter von Lomersheim (right) and Günther von Henneberg (left) flank Maulbronn Monastery
- Known for: Donating land for Maulbronn Monastery

Walter von Lomersheim was a German knight considered to be the founder of Maulbronn Monastery.

In 1138, von Lomersheim donated land he had inherited near modern-day Mühlacker to the Cistercians and became a lay brother of their order. However, the property was unsuitable for an abbey, so Günther von Henneberg, Bishop of Speyer, ordered Hirsau Abbey to cede the manor of "Mulenbrunnen" near the Stromberg to the young monastic community to give it access to water and cliffs for quarrying. The fledgling monastery received further support from Werner von Roßwag and Gerta von Grüningen.

Walter von Lomersheim is known to have had two siblings, named Ita and Konrad.
