= Heuchelberg =

Hill ridge in Baden-Württemberg, Germany

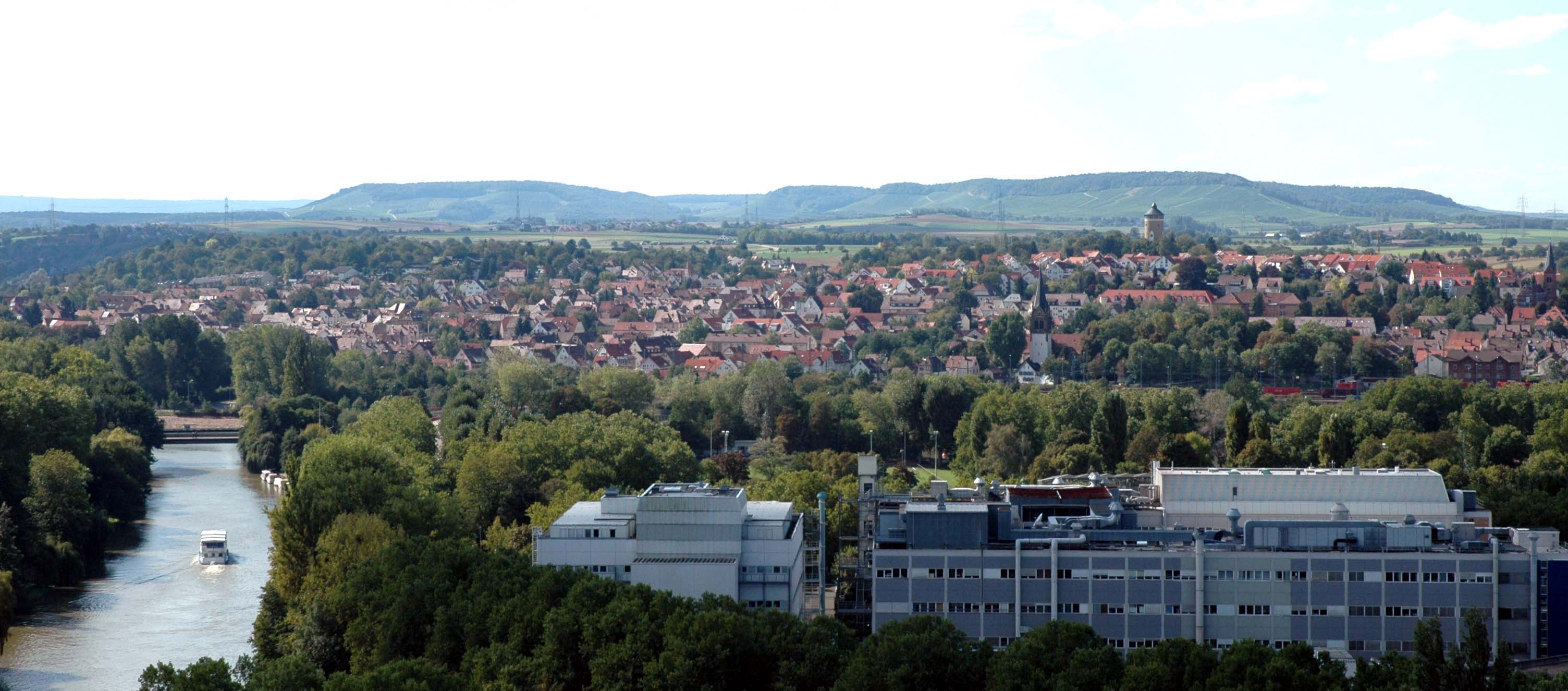
- View over Heilbronn-Böckingen with the Heuchelberg behind

Highest point
- Peak: unnamed highest point of the Heuchelberg tip
- Elevation: 353 m above NN

Dimensions
- Length: 15 km (9.3 mi)

Geography
- Location within Baden-Württemberg
- State(s): Heilbronn, Baden-Württemberg, Germany
- Range coordinates: 49°06′30″N 9°00′31″E
- Parent range: South German Scarplands

Geology
- Orogeny: Schichtstufe
- Rock type(s): Keuper, Schilfsandstein

The Heuchelberg (German pronunciation: [ˈhɔɪ̯çl̩ˌbɛʁk]) is a hill ridge, about 15 kilometres long and up to 353 m above sea level (NN), a few kilometres southwest of the city of Heilbronn in the eponymous county in the German state of Baden-Württemberg.

== Location ==
The Heuchelberg and the adjacent Stromberg region south of the River Zaber both give their names to the Stromberg-Heuchelberg Nature Park founded in 1980, the third nature park in Baden-Württemberg.

The Heuchelberg runs through the western part of the county of Heilbronn between Leingarten in the northeast and Zaberfeld in the southwest. It lies on the territories of the following towns and villages (clockwise from the northeast): Leingarten, Nordheim, Brackenheim, Güglingen, Pfaffenhofen and Zaberfeld (in the southwest) and Eppingen (only the municipality of Kleingartach), Schwaigern and finally Leingarten again.

== Hills ==
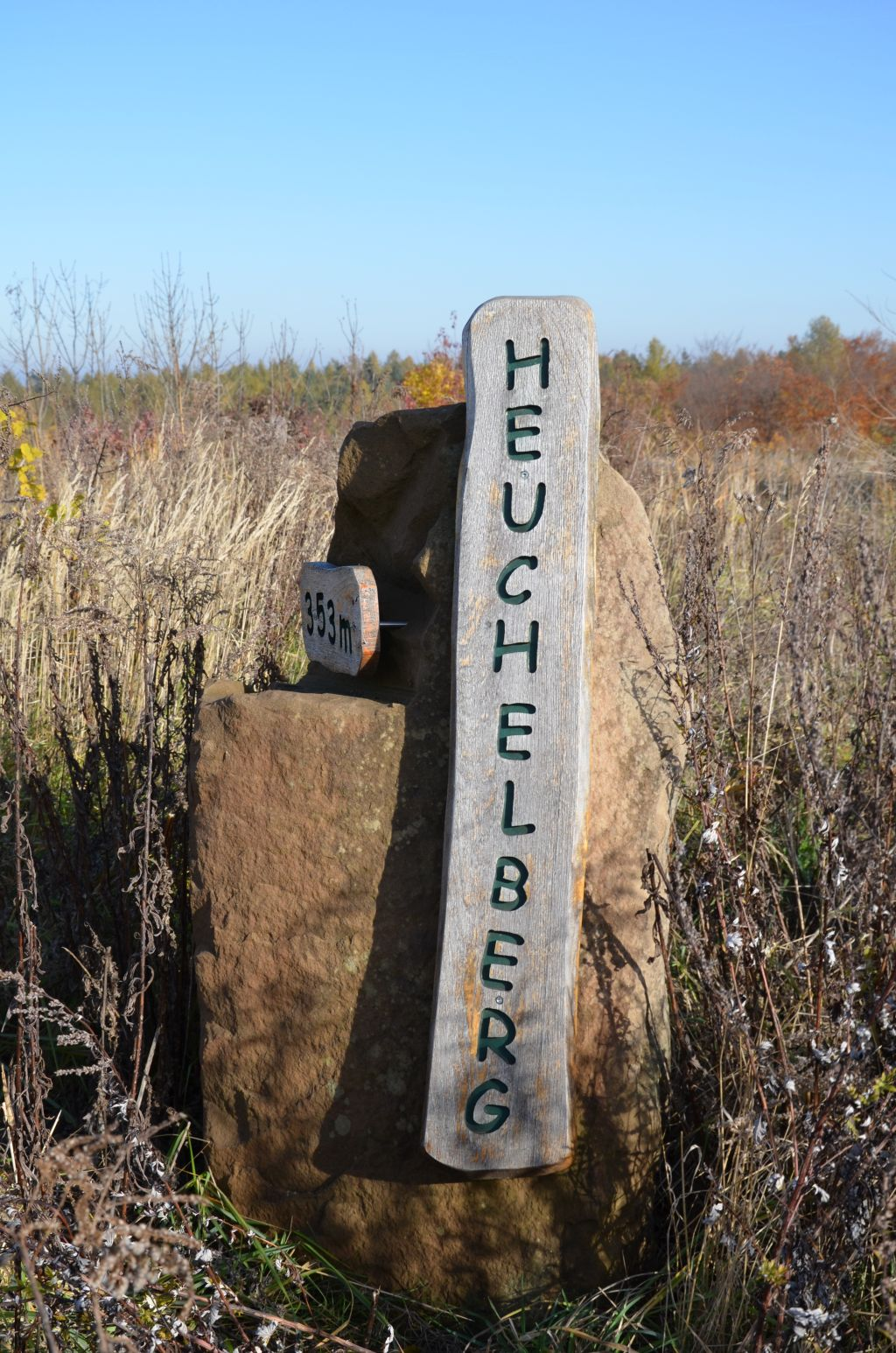
Highest point of the Heuchelberg on the Heuchelberg tip near Haberschlacht

The hills and high points of the Heuchelberg ridge include the following − sorted by height in metres above Normalnull (NN):

- unnamed highest point of the Heuchelberg rubbish tip (353 m), between Stetten and Haberschlacht
- Heidelberg (335.9 m), between Neipperg and Nordhausen
- High point on the Wolfsgrube (335.7 m), between Stetten and Haberschlacht
- Eichbühl (335 m), between Neipperg and Stetten
- Ottilienberg (313.6 m), between Eppingen and Kleingartach; including a circular rampart
- Spitzenberg (276.4 m), in Zaberfeld; with transmission towers and former castle of Burghalde
