= Stromberg-Heuchelberg Nature Park =

Nature park in Baden-Württemberg, Germany

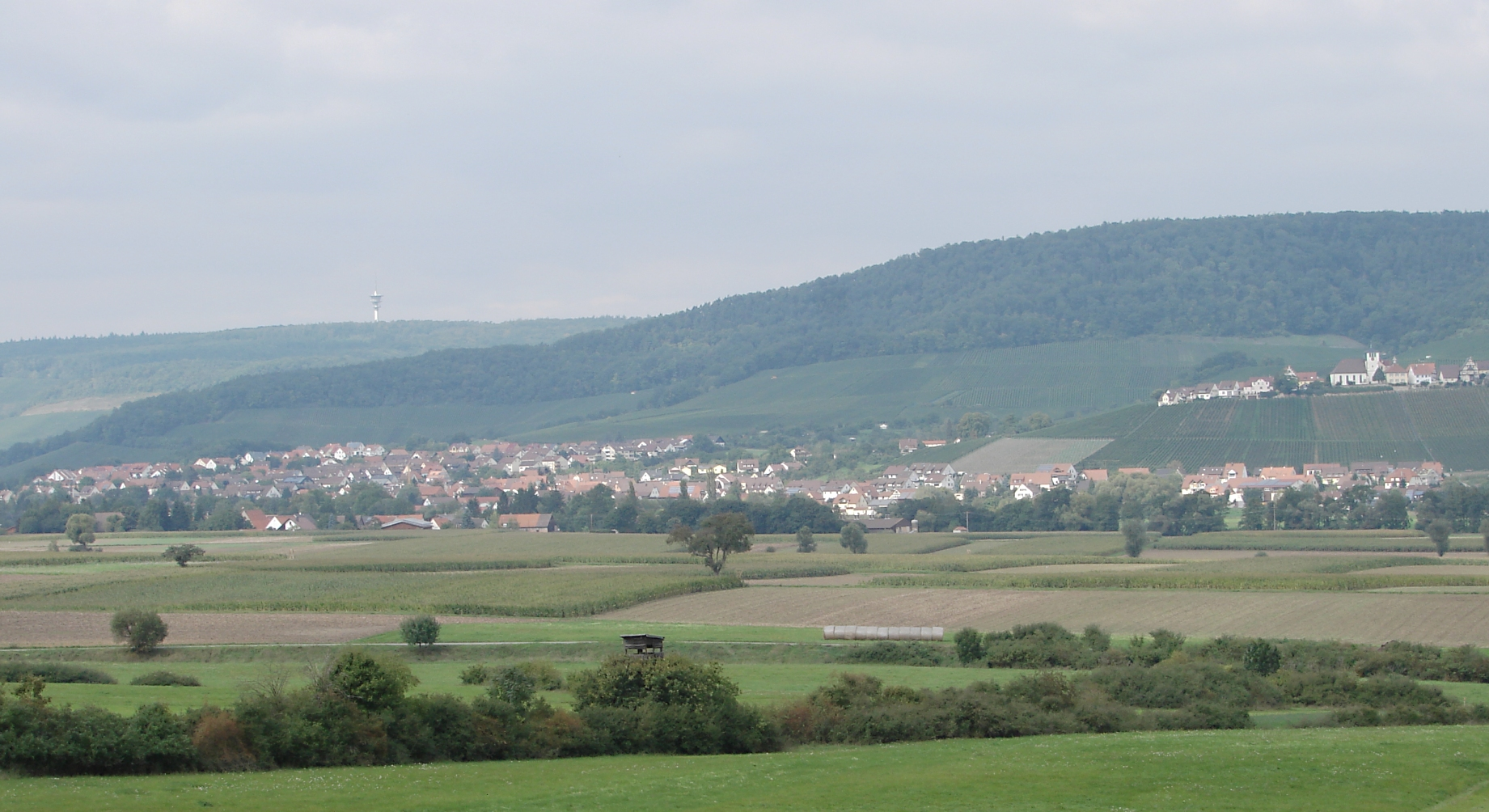
Stromberg-Heuchelberg Nature Park

The Stromberg-Heuchelberg Nature Park covers 328.2 km^{2} and is part of the districts of Ludwigsburg, Heilbronn, Karlsruhe and Enzkreis in Baden-Württemberg, Germany, with Ludwigsburg having the largest share. The nature park is characterised by the two mountain ranges, Stromberg and Heuchelberg. Geologically, the nature park belongs to the Keuper Uplands. The southern slopes of the Stromberg are suitable for viticulture. Numerous hiking trails lead through the nature park. A large part of the area is forested.

At the request of the city of Bretten, an area of woodland of about 20 hectares in the Bretten district was taken out of the nature park, the area was cleared and is now available as an extension of the Gölshausen industrial estate. In 2004, 6,000 signatures were collected against this project by the "Initiative Rüdtwald", which is committed to the preservation of the mixed forest, which is particularly ecologically valuable there.

In May 2009 the new nature park centre was opened at the Ehmetsklinge reservoir in Zaberfeld, serving as a central contact point for visitors. It houses the office and an exhibition. Under the motto "Wein. Wald. Wohlfühlen" (transl. Wine. Forest. Feel Good.), the exhibition informs about the different facets of the region and the sights in the nature park.
