= Ottilienberg =

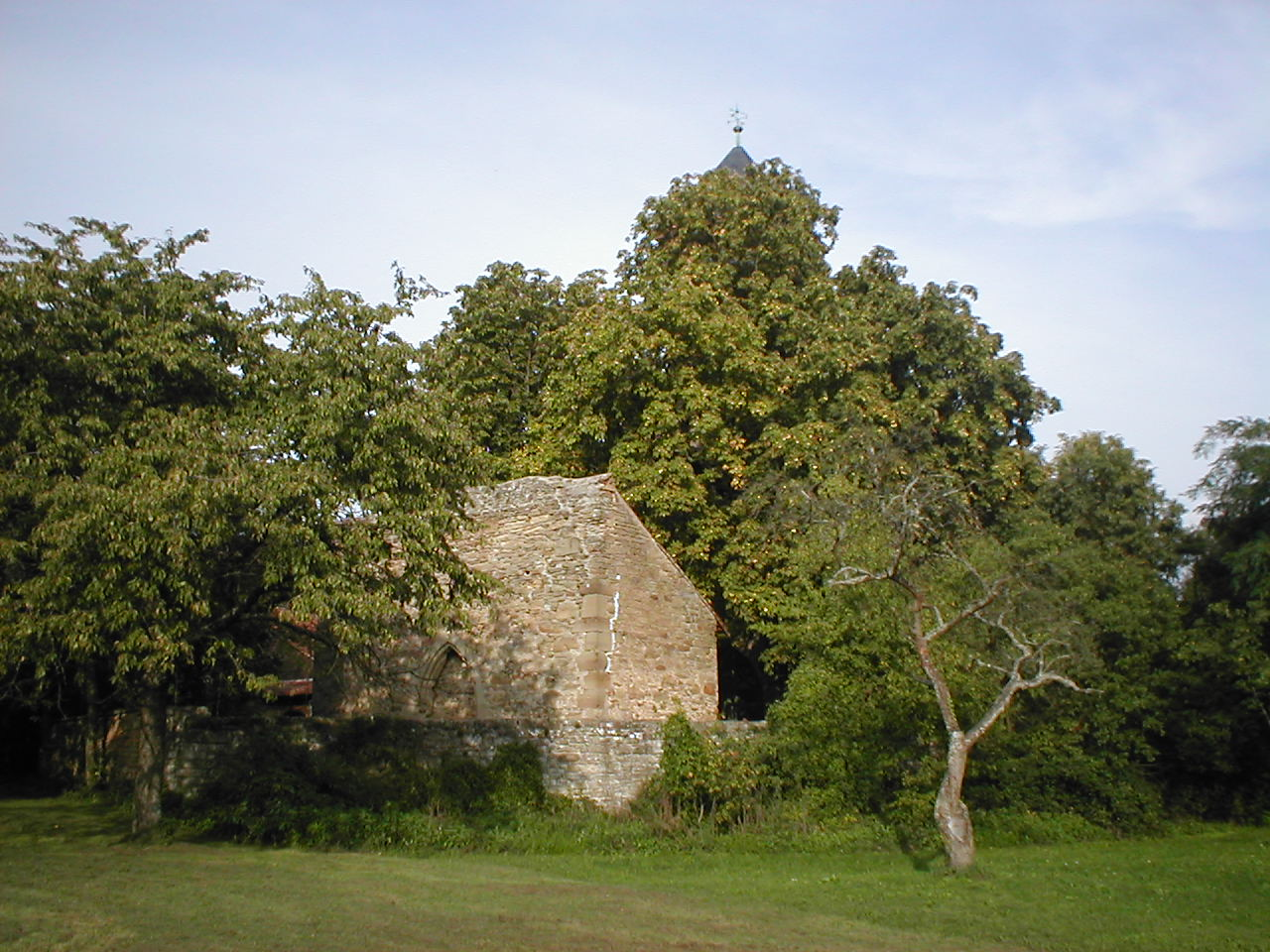
- Remains of historical buildings on the Ottilienberg

Highest point
- Elevation: 314.1 m (1,031 ft)
- Coordinates: 49°06′57.6″N 8°55′51.6″E

Geography
- Location within Baden-Württemberg Location within Germany
- Location: Baden-Württemberg, Germany

The Ottilienberg is a mountain and forested area near Eppingen in Baden-Württemberg, Germany. The place was inhabited in ancient history. On top of the mountain are the remains of a late medieval pilgrimage church and remains of a fortification from the 17th century.

The mountain itself is a sandstone oval about 3 km south east of Eppingen. Because of the extraordinary geological formation, the 310 m high mountain is assumed to be a very early refuge and cult place. The pilgrimage church was donated in 1473. South of the chapel was a graveyard. 1697 the mountain top was dismantled to an artillery fortress. While the fortress decayed through the following decades, the church and some surrounding economy buildings did remain, until they were severely damaged during World War II in April 1945. The chapel was reconstructed in simplified shape in 1954/55.

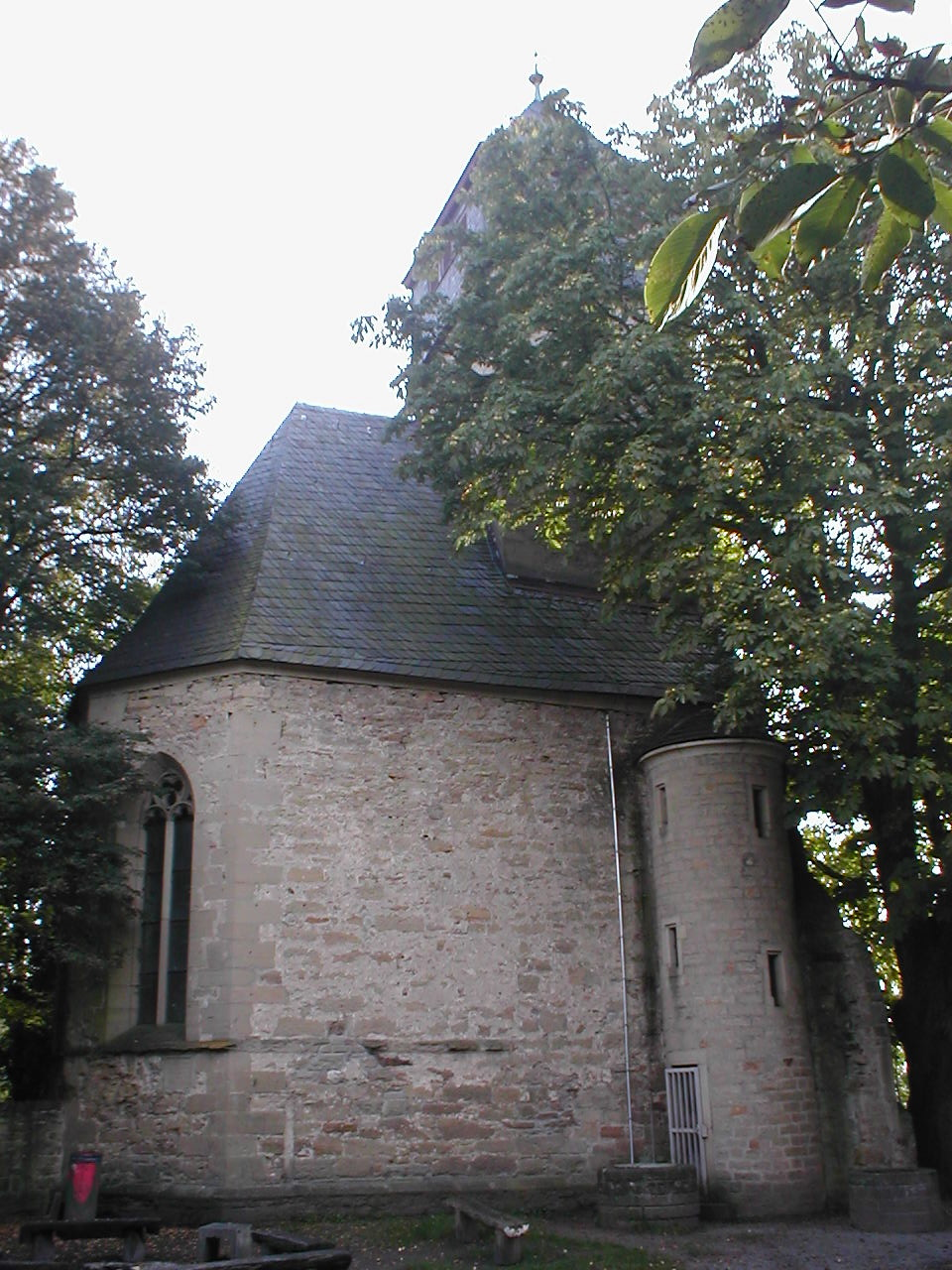
Pilgrimage church

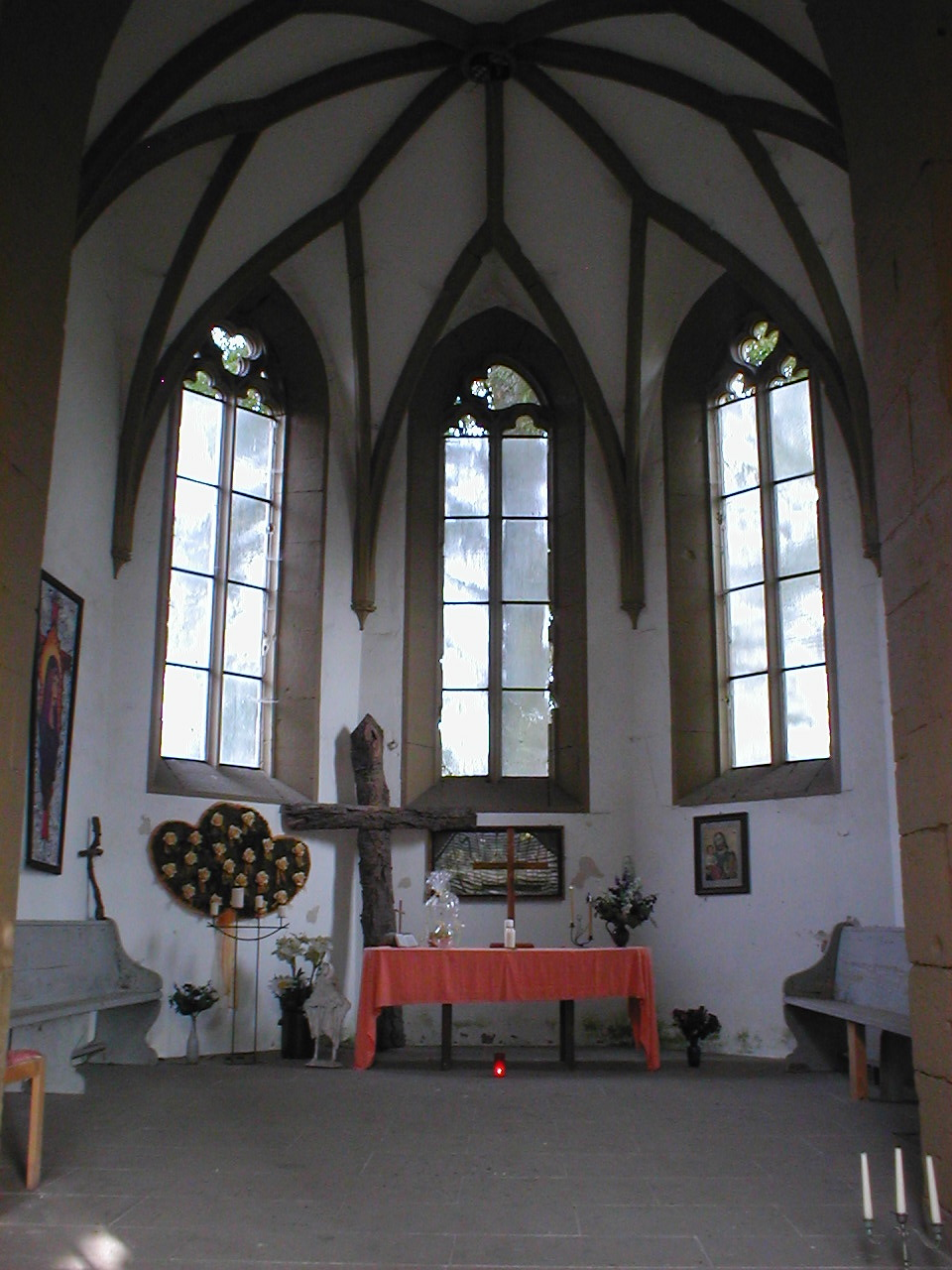
Inside of church
