= Klinge (landform) =

Klingen are small, narrow, steep V-shaped valleys formed by the erosive forces of water and suspended abrasive particles, gravel and pebbles. They are usually side valleys without a discernible valley floor that lead into a main valley. Further incision through ablation and headward erosion is mainly caused by the waters of small, steep, fast flowing, streams or becks and their processes are still visible today. Erosion, sedimentation and transport are mutually dependent. The term klinge is German and is used to refer to European stream landforms, especially in southern Germany and eastern France.

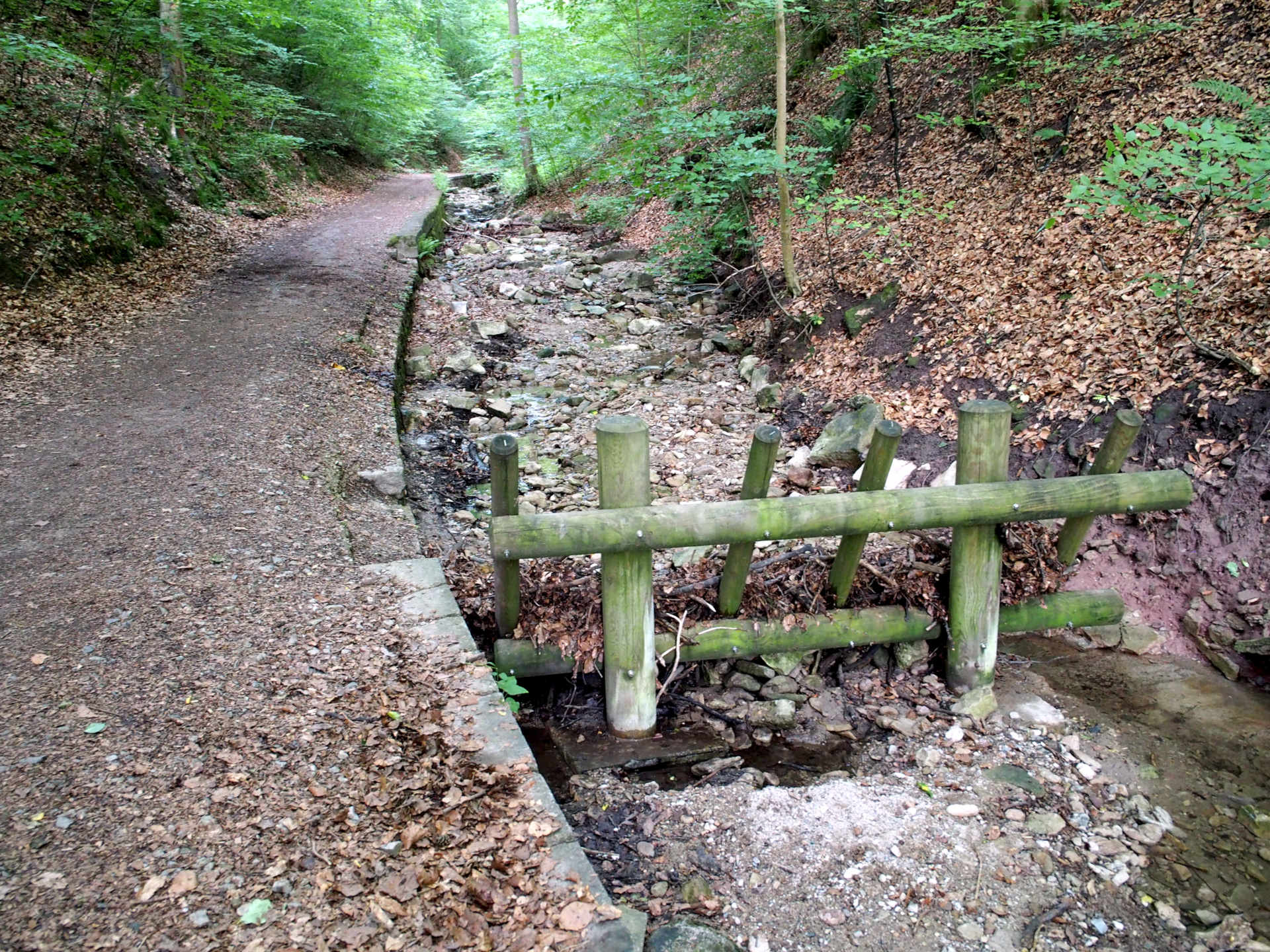
Bottom of the Schwälblesklinge (affluent to the Nesenbach), river bed full of cobble and revetted way

== Name ==
The description klinge for small V-shaped valleys may derive from the noise of the streams when in spate (klingen in German means "ring" "clang" or "jingle"). Another interpretation maintains that the little valleys were supposed to be cut by blades ("Klinge" = blade). In the whole of southwest Germany, including the Swabian and Franconian Jura, this sort of valley is known as a Klinge, Tobel or Klamm.

These valleys are habitats for the common midwife toad, which, in many places, is also called the Steinklinge ("Stone klinke") or Klinkerkröte ("Klinker Toad"), its spawning waters are thus referred to as Klingelsiepen, Klingelborn, Klingelschlade, Klingelpütt or Glockenteich, all names that refer to its very characteristic call.

In northwest Germany such erosion valleys are called Siepen, Siefen or Seif, or Sieke.

== Geomorphology ==
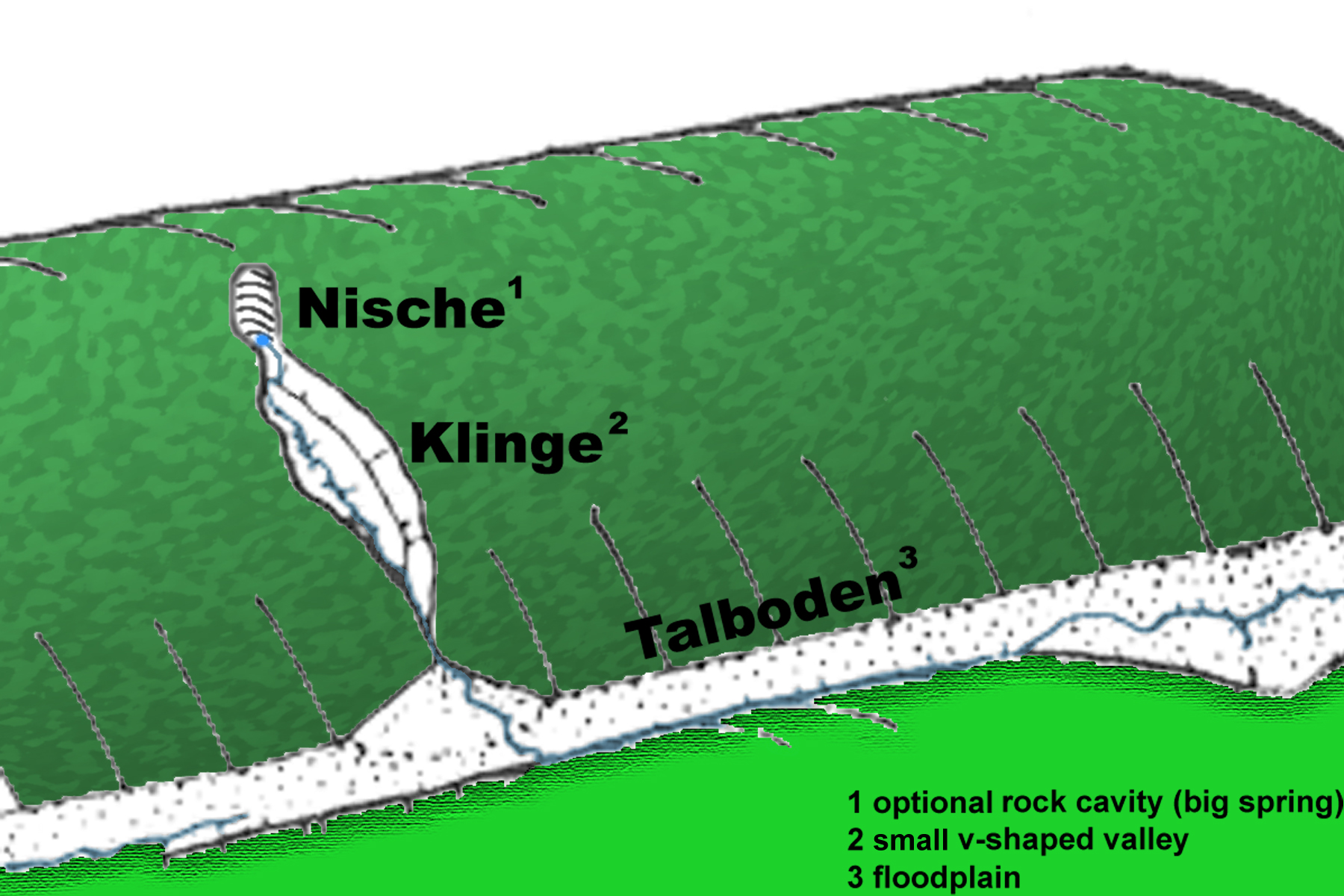
Water and gravel erosion on the slope of an escarpment

Klingen occur especially in the small catchment areas of heavily forested low mountain regions, carved out by erosion processes even today, where, as a result of the alternating layers of porous sandstones or limestones on top of impervious clays and marls, small springs arise. Hillsides are often undercut which may trigger small or medium-sized landslips or even mudflows. In southwestern Germany these processes occur especially in the small, steep-sided valley that flow into the Rhine system.

In harder, jointed (and therefore pervious) rocks, landslips are rarer. Instead rockfalls or even collapses occur on massifs and rock faces. These processes are encouraged in the winter months mainly by frost weathering. Especially susceptible are steep rock faces in Muschelkalk and White Jurassic.

== Distribution ==
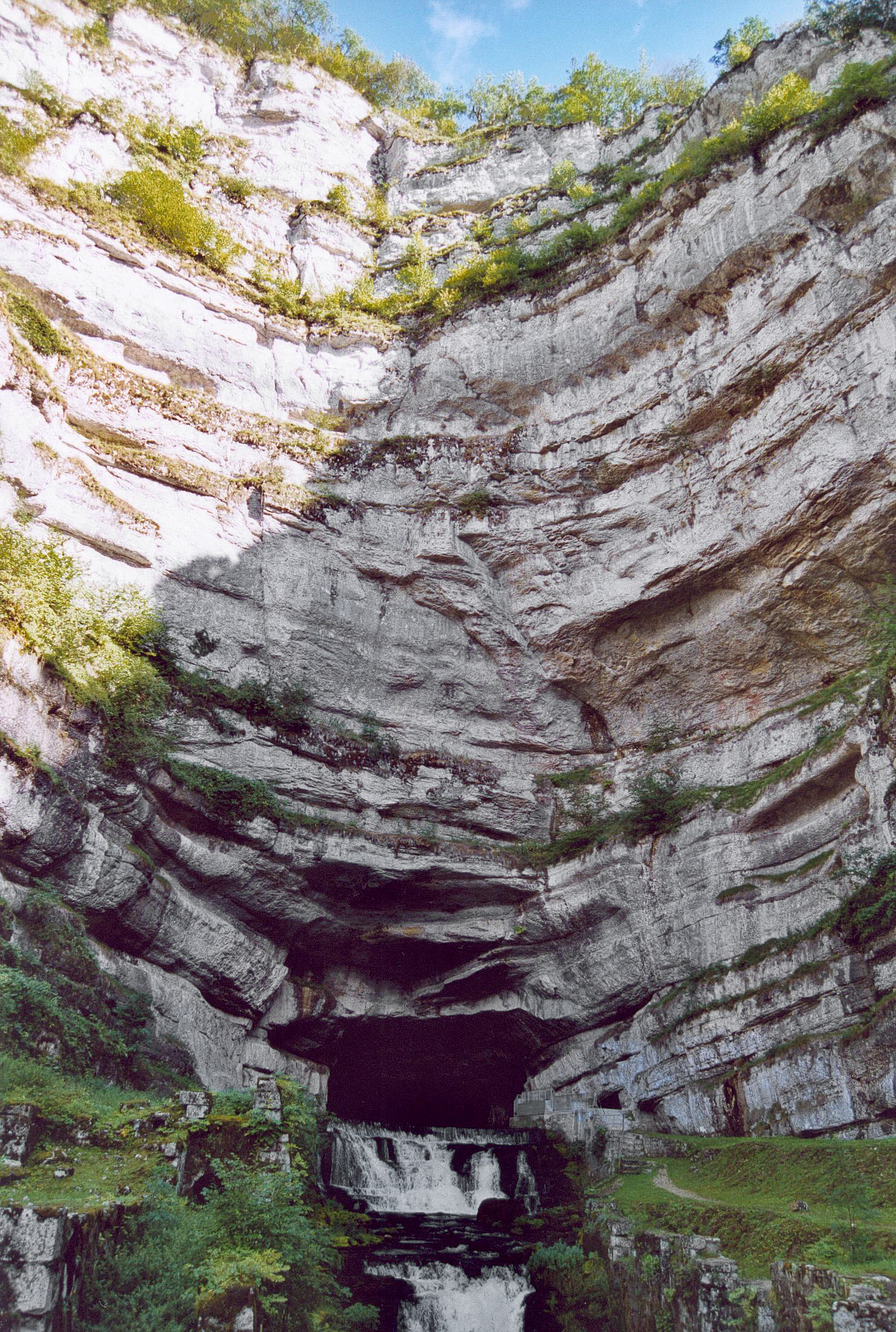
Karst spring of the Loue in the French Jura near Orhans/Pontarlier

In the regions of the Swabian and Franconian Jura, klingen are less common than in the hills in front of them in the South German Scarplands.

At the strata boundaries of steep Jurassic rock faces – such as those of the Albtrauf or the Swiss-French Jura – strong permanent or periodic karst springs have scoured out steep, often concave, vertical rock niches, for example: the Teufelsklinge near Heubach (on the Albtrauf of the Ostalb) and the Résurgence in the French Jura (source of the Loue).

== Literature ==
- Joachim Eberle et al.: Deutschlands Süden – vom Erdmittelalter zur Gegenwart. Spektrum-Akademischer Verlag, Heidelberg, 2007, ISBN 978-3-8274-1506-6.
- Georg Wagner: Einführung in die Erd- und Landschaftsgeschichte mit besonderer Berücksichtigung Süddeutschlands. Hohenlohesche Buchhandlung Ferdinand Rau, Öhringen, 1960.
