= Aalkistensee =

Lake in Baden-Württemberg, Germany

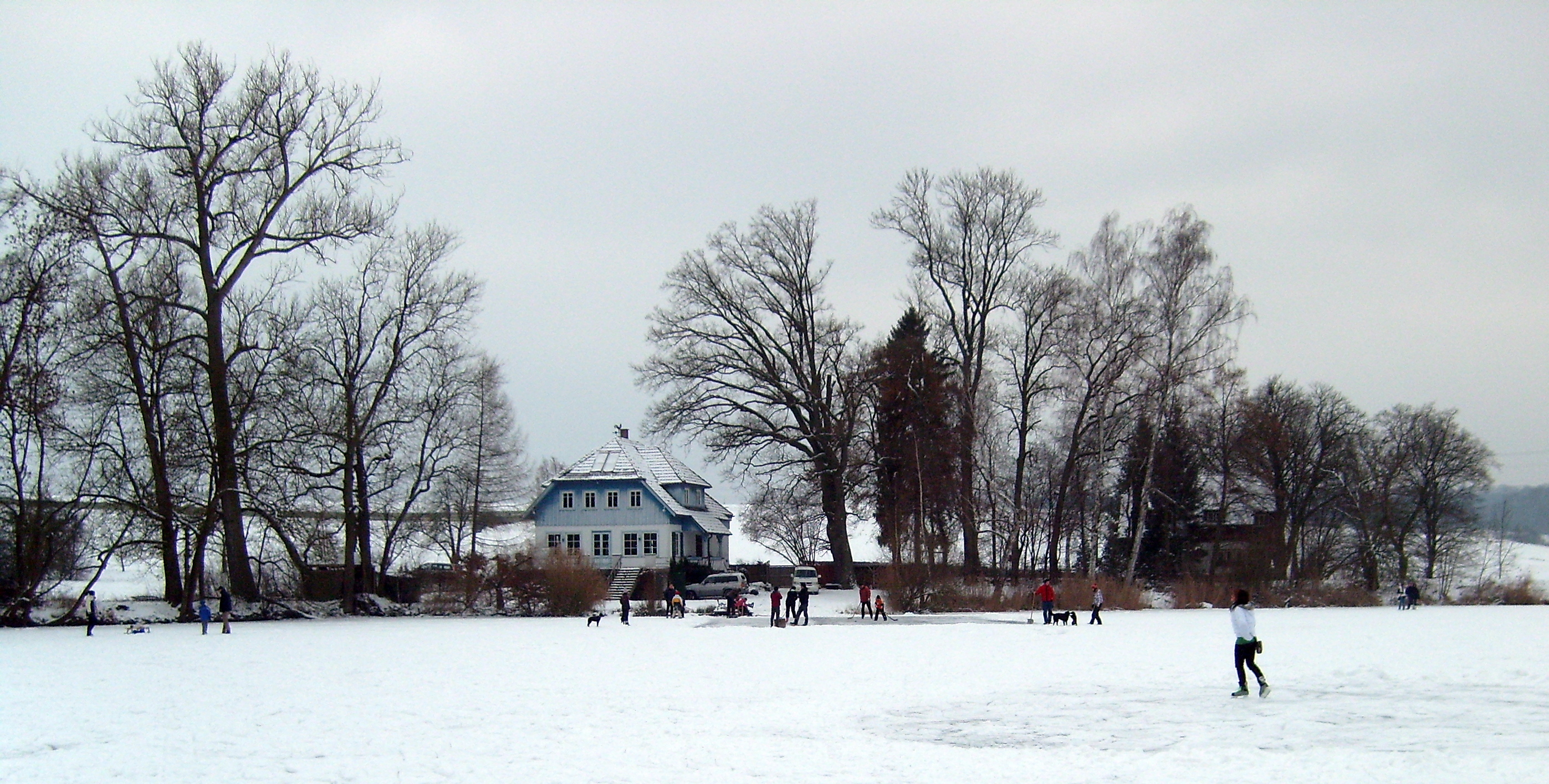

- Location within Germany
- Location: Kraichgau, Baden-Württemberg
- Coordinates: 48°59′36″N 08°45′37″E
- Basin countries: Germany
- Surface area: 0.136 km^{2} (0.053 sq mi)
- Max. depth: 20 m (66 ft)
- Surface elevation: ca 250 m (820 ft)

Aalkistensee is a lake in Kraichgau, Baden-Württemberg, Germany. At an elevation of ca 250 m, its surface area is 0.136 km^{2}. The lake is a karst lake, which formed from a sinkhole above collapsed gypsym beds.
