= Stromberg (landscape) =

Hill ridge in Baden-Württemberg, Germany

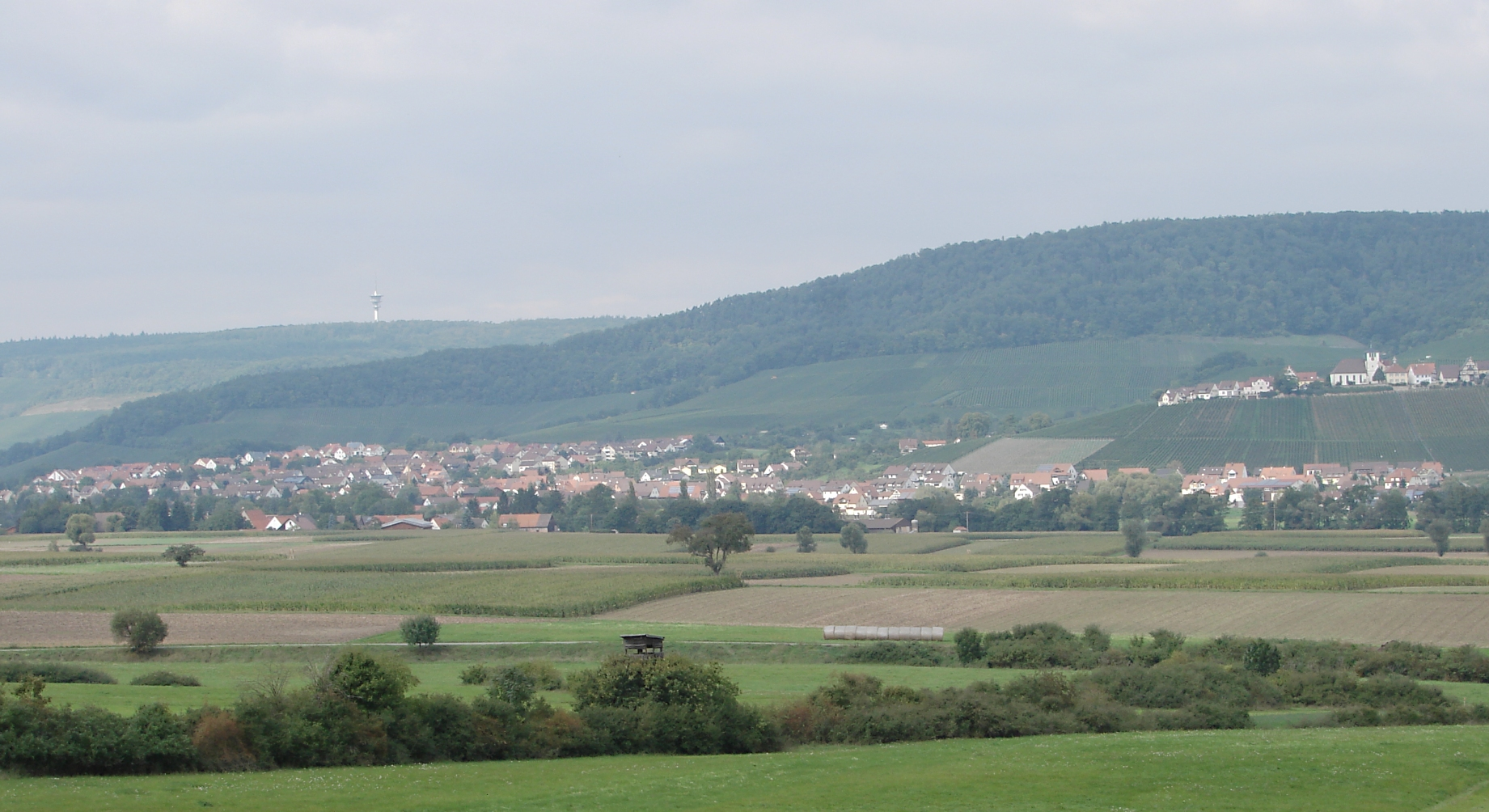
- Stromberg main chain with the Hohenhaslach in the Kirbach valley and the Brackenheim 1 transmission tower (on the horizon) from the south

Highest point
- Peak: Baiselsberg
- Elevation: 476.6 m above NN

Geography
- Location within Baden-Württemberg
- State(s): counties of Enzkreis, Karlsruhe, Heilbronn and Ludwigsburg, Baden-Württemberg, Germany
- Range coordinates: 49°00′14″N 8°59′19″E
- Parent range: South German Scarplands

Geology
- Orogeny: Schichtstufe
- Rock type(s): Keuper, Reed sandstone, Lower Bunter Marl, Upper Bunter Marl, Stubensandstein

The Stromberg (German pronunciation: [ˈʃtʁoːmˌbɛʁk]) is a heavily forested hill ridge up to 476.6 m above sea level (NN) in the northern part of the German state of Baden-Württemberg.

== Literature ==
- Dieter Buck (2006), Das große Buch vom Stromberg-Heuchelberg. Natur, Kultur, Geschichte, Orte (in German) (1. ed.), Tübingen: Silberburg-Verlag, ISBN 3-87407-704-7
- Karl Eduard Paulus: Beschreibung des Oberamts Brackenheim. Hrsg. von dem Königlichen statistisch-topographischen Bureau. H. Lindemann, Stuttgart 1873, Wikisource
- Karl Eduard Paulus: Beschreibung des Oberamts Vaihingen. Hrsg. von dem Königlichen statistisch-topographischen Bureau. Hallberger, Stuttgart 1856. Wikisource
