= Sandra Detzer =

German politician (born 1980)

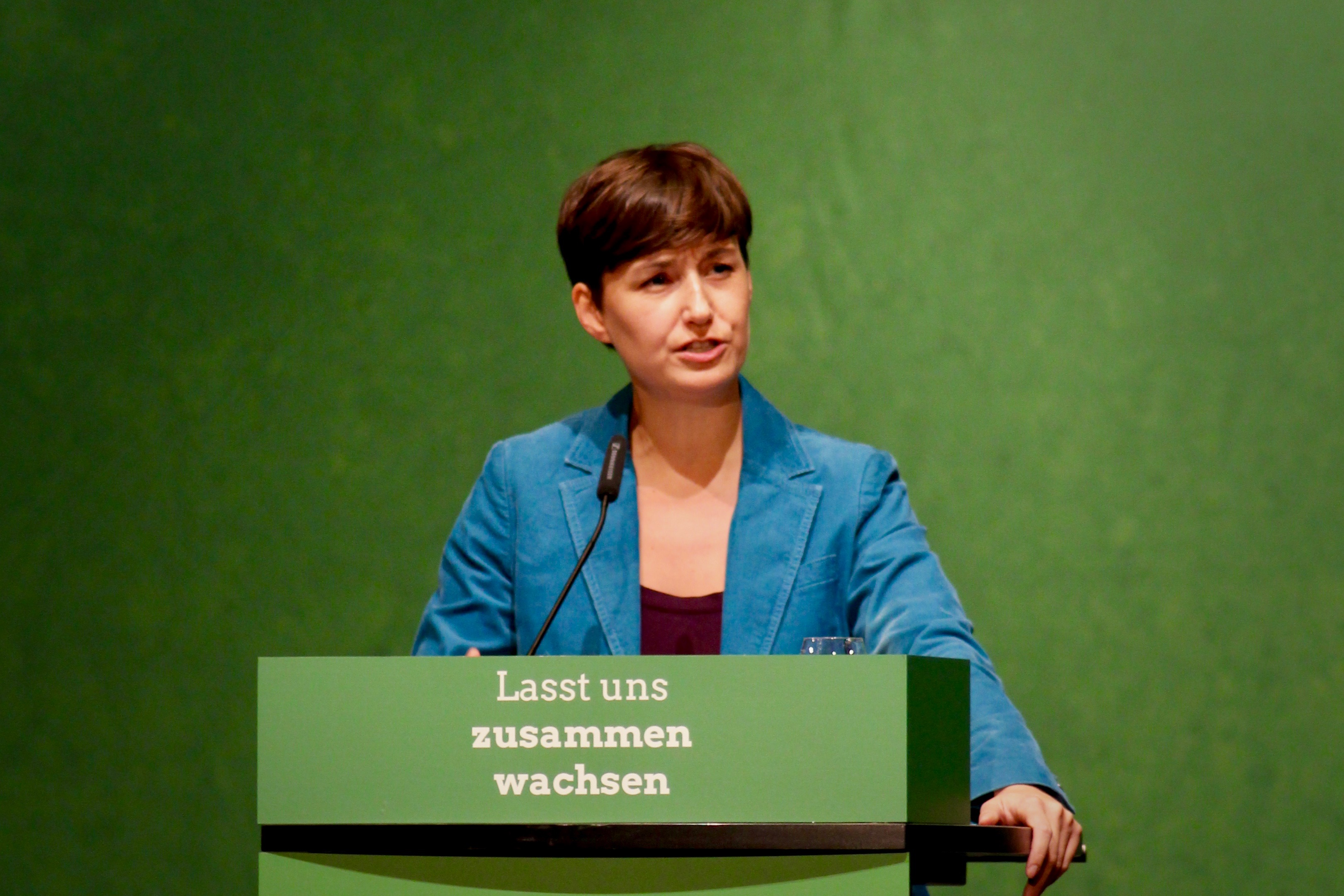

Member of the Bundestag
- Incumbent
- Assumed office 2021

Personal details
- Born: 21 April 1980 (age 46) Munich, Bavaria, West Germany (now Germany)
- Citizenship: German
- Party: Alliance '90/The Greens
- Education: LMU Munich; Heidelberg University

Sandra Detzer (born 21 April 1980) is a German politician of the Alliance 90/The Greens who has been serving as a Member of the Bundestag since the 2021 elections, representing the Ludwigsburg district.

== Early life and education ==
Detzer was born in Munich as the daughter of a dentist and a teacher and graduated from high school there in 1999. She then studied political science and economics at LMU Munich from 1999 to 2005. From 2006 to 2010, she completed her doctorate at Heidelberg University on the topic of fiscal decentralization in Germany's federal states. She subsequently worked as a research assistant to Uwe Wagschal on the topic of the consolidation of government budgets.

== Early career ==
From 2011 until 2016, Detzer worked as advisor on financial and economic policy to the Green Party's parliamentary group at the State Parliament of Baden-Württemberg.

== Political career ==
=== Career in state politics ===
From 2016 to 2021, Detzer co-chaired the Green Party in Baden-Württemberg, alongside Oliver Hildenbrand. Under her leadership, the board decided on the expulsion of Boris Palmer from the party in 2021.

In the negotiations to form a coalition government under the leadership of Minister-President of Baden-Württemberg Winfried Kretschmann following the 2021 state elections, Detzer led her party's delegation in the working group on climate, environmental policy and energy; her co-chair from the CDU was Andreas Jung.

=== Member of the German Parliament, 2021–present ===
In parliament, Detzer has been serving on the Finance Committee and the Committee on Economic Affairs since 2021. Since 2023, she has been her parliamentary group’s spokesperson for economic affairs.

In addition to her committee assignments, Detzer has been serving as deputy chair of the German-French Parliamentary Group.

In the negotiations to form a coalition government under the leadership of Cem Özdemir following the 2026 state elections in Baden-Württemberg, Detzer was part of her party's delegation in the working group on economic affairs, co-chaired by Andrea Lindlohr and Winfried Mack.

== Other activities ==
- Federal Network Agency for Electricity, Gas, Telecommunications, Post and Railway (BNetzA), Alternate Member of the Advisory Board (since 2022)
