= Schiefer =

Schiefer is a German-language surname and a metonymic occupational name for a roofer. It may refer to:

- Arnold Schiefer (born 1966), Austrian politician
- Gernot Schiefer
- Marion Schiefer (born 1975), German politician
- Ulrich Schiefer (1952), German rural and development sociologist and anthropologist
- Ulrich W. Schiefer (1958), German graduated engineer
- Waltraud Schiefer (1979), Italian luger
