= Schiefner =

Schiefner is a surname. Notable people with the surname include:

- Franz Anton Schiefner (1817–1879), Baltic German linguist and tibetologist
- Udo Schiefner (1959–2025), German politician

== See also ==
- Schiffner
