= Schiffer =

Schiffer (German pronunciation: [ˈʃɪfɐ]) is a German occupational surname, which means a "boatman", "bargee" or "skipper". Alternative spellings include Schifer and Schiffers. The name may refer to:

- Adolf Schiffer (1873–1950), Hungarian cellist
- András Schiffer (born 1971), Hungarian politician
- Ben Schiffer (born 1983), British writer
- Claudia Schiffer (born 1970), German model
- Craig Schiffer (1956–2014), American businessman
- Emanuel Schiffers (1850–1904), Russian chess player and writer
- Ervin Schiffer (1932–2015), Hungarian musician
- Eugen Schiffer (1860–1954), German politician
- Feivel Schiffer (1809–1871), Polish poet and writer
- Fredric Schiffer (medical degree 1971), American psychiatrist
- Hubert Schiffer (1915–1982), German priest
- John Schiffer (1945–2014), American politician
- Menahem Max Schiffer (1911–1997), American mathematician
- Michael Brian Schiffer (born 1947), American archaeologist
- Paul Schiffer (born 1959), American radio host
- Roy Schiffer Pinney (1911–2010), American photographer and writer
- Sharon Hammes-Schiffer (born 1966), American chemist
- Stephen Schiffer (born 1940), American philosopher

== Other uses ==
- Schiffer Publishing, Pennsylvania
- Schiffers & Co., Poland

== See also ==
- Schaefer
- Scheffer
- Schieffer
- Schiffner
