= Schieffer =

Schieffer (German pronunciation: [ˈʃiːfɐ, ˈʃiːfər]):

- Bob Lloyd Schieffer (born 1937), an American television journalist
- Rudolf Schieffer (1947-2018), German historian
- Theodor Schieffer (1910 in Bad Godesberg – 1992 in Bad Godesberg), a German historian
- John Thomas "Tom" Schieffer (born 1947), an American diplomat

Schiefer is also German for slate

== See also ==
- Schiffer
- Schiefer
