= Lauffen am Neckar =

Lauffen
- Town
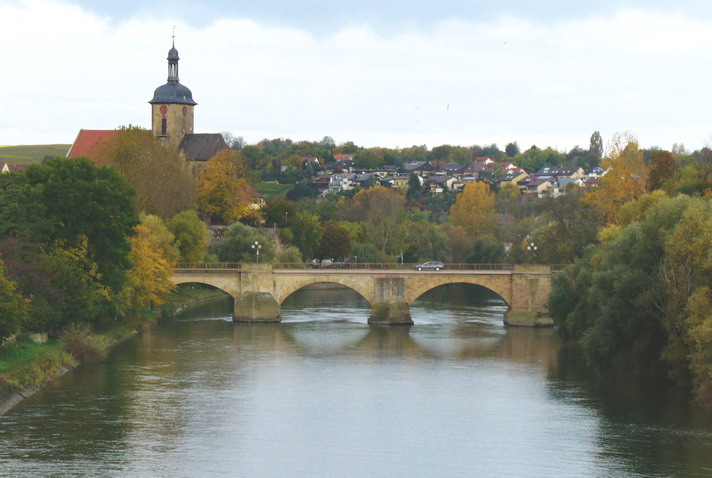
- Neckar bridge at Lauffen

- Coat of arms

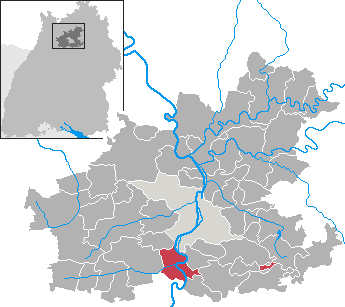
- Location of Lauffen within Heilbronn district
- Interactive map of Lauffen
- Location within Germany Location within Baden-Württemberg
- Coordinates: 49°05′N 9°09′E
- Country: Germany
- State: Baden-Württemberg
- Admin. region: Stuttgart
- District: Heilbronn
- Subdivisions: 1 district

Government
  - Mayor (2023–31): Sarina Pfründer

Area
  - Total: 22.63 km^{2} (8.74 sq mi)
- Elevation: 175 m (574 ft)

Population (2025-12-31)
  - Total: 12,218
  - Density: 539.9/km^{2} (1,398/sq mi)
- Time zone: UTC+01:00 (CET)
  - Summer (DST): UTC+02:00 (CEST)
- Postal codes: 74344-74348
- Dialling codes: 07133
- Vehicle registration: HN
- Website: www.lauffen.de

Lauffen am Neckar (German pronunciation: [ˌlaʊfn̩ ʔam ˈnɛkaʁ], lit. 'Lauffen on the Neckar') or simply Lauffen is a town in the district of Heilbronn, Baden-Württemberg, Germany. It is on the river Neckar, 9 kilometres (6 miles) southwest of Heilbronn. The town is famous as the birthplace of the poet Friedrich Hölderlin and for its quality wines – in particular the "Lauffener Katzenbeißer Schwarzriesling".

== Geography ==
Lauffen is located in the southern part of the district of Heilbronn, 9 km (6 mi) south of Heilbronn and 50 km (31 mi) north of the capital of Baden-Württemberg, Stuttgart, on the Neckar. The small river Zaber flows into the Neckar at this point. The neck of the previous great bow in the course of the north-flowing Neckar was broken through by erosion somewhere between 400 BC and 100 BC and for several centuries the watercourse survived as a ring of lakes. The old circular riverbed is now dry, apart from one small artificial lake. Along the old riverbed, a round hill was formed – its slopes now partially covered by the Kaywald forest and with other areas given over to the cultivation of vines. There is a hill on the western bank of the Neckar at the centre point of the ancient river bow. This hill became separated from another on the present eastern bank when the river broke through.

Lauffen grew up on the western bank, on the ridge which is the site of today's Regiswindis Church. This hill settlement became known as Lauffen-Dorf (Lauffen village). In the middle of the river, between the two hills, is an island with a castle. This castle, originally the seat of the Earls of Lauffen, is now home to the town hall – the island itself is a nature reserve. Another settlement, Lauffen-Stadt (Lauffen town), later established itself on the hill on the eastern bank. The two districts, Lauffen-Dorf and Lauffen-Stadt, are joined by a bridge. A smaller bridge from Lauffen-Stadt leads to the island and the town hall. Yet another district, the so-called Lauffen-Dörfle (Lauffen little village), grew up around a convent and is situated on the western bank to the north of Lauffen-Dorf and the Zaber. An exclave of Lauffen, the town's forest of Etzlenswenden, is located further east in the Löwenstein Mountains. It is presumed that this forested area was allocated to the town by its founders in around AD 1200, as there was no other forest within its boundaries from which timber and firewood could be obtained. It is here, in the exclave, that the highest point is situated 452 m (1,483 ft) above sea level; the lowest point 154 m (505 ft) above sea level is by the Neckar.

=== Neighbouring municipalities ===
Neighbouring towns and villages of Lauffen are (clockwise from the west): Brackenheim, Nordheim, Heilbronn, Talheim, Isfeld, Neckarwestheim and Kirchheim am Neckar (District of Ludwigsburg). The exclave Stadtwald Etzlenswenden is surrounded (from the west) by Abstatt, Untergruppenbach, Löwenstein and Beilstein. All neighbouring villages as far as Heilbronn and Kircheim come under the Landkreis (district) Heilbronn. Lauffen has combined with Neckarwestheim and Nordheim to form a joint association of administrations.

=== Town structure ===
The localities of Lauffen-Stadt (town) and Lauffen-Dorf (village) were combined on 1 April 1914 to create today's Lauffen am Neckar. The outlying farmsteads of the Landturm, an old customs house on the former Württemberg boundary, are included as part of the town. The defunct hamlets of Osterhofen and Talhofen originally lay within its bounds.

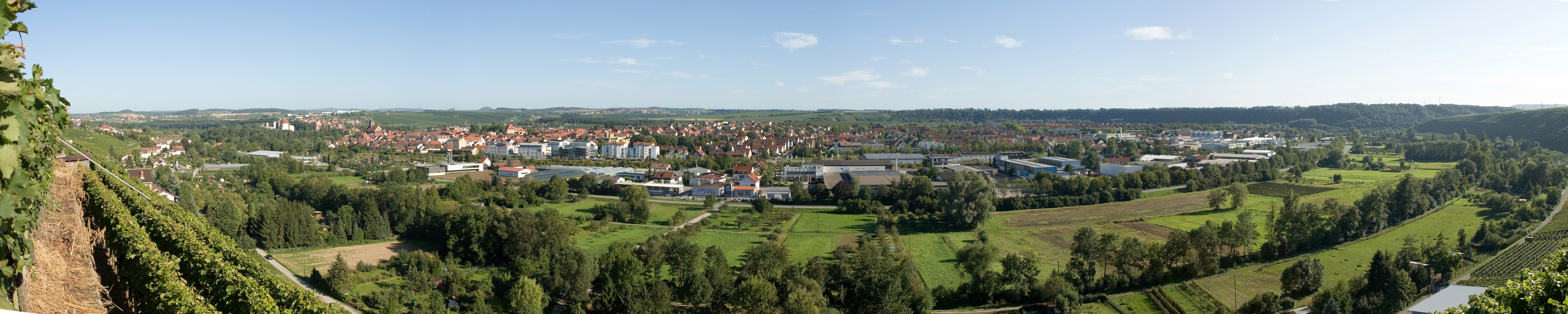
Lauffen as seen from the Geigersberg hill

== History ==
=== First settlement and origin of place name ===
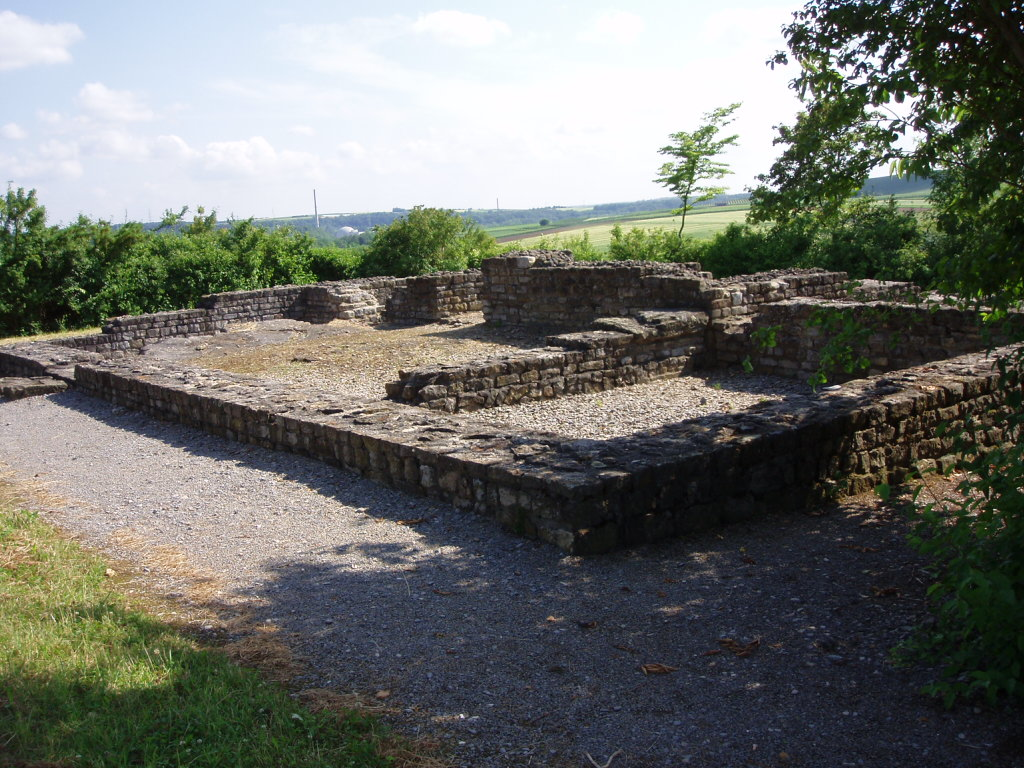
Villa rustica in Lauffen

It is presumed that the area around Lauffen had already been settled in pre-Christian times, although the only evidence consists of a few bones. The settlement's high level of frequentation can be attributed to the shallow water between the present old Neckar bridge and the cliffs by the castle and Regiswindis Church. Here the river was fordable for most of the year and the spot used by both men and animals as a crossing point. Such opportunities were few and far between along this stretch of the original Neckar. Indeed, the nearest fords were some kilometres distant. The two prominent cliffs may well have served as lookouts and refuges since primeval times.

The foundations of a Roman estate (Villa Rustica) dating from between the 2nd and 3rd centuries, along with coins and pottery, were discovered some two kilometres (1.2 miles) to the southeast of the present town centre. Archaeological excavations show that the Alemannians came to the area in around 260 AD upon the departure of the Romans. With the arrival of the Franks in 500 AD, a royal estate was founded together with a church dedicated to St Martin. The ownership of the estate alternated frequently between princes and church. A document from 823 refers to this "church in the tribal district of Neckar which is dedicated to Saint Martin in the Villa Hlauppa."

The name "Hlauppa" (which has become "Lauffen") is characteristic of places with rapids or waterfalls. Other examples of this derivation are Laufen and Laufenburg. The rapids which are occasionally visible at Lauffen were created by erosion when the Neckar shortened its course after breaking through the neck of a great bow – an event which is estimated to have taken place between 400 BC and 100 BC.

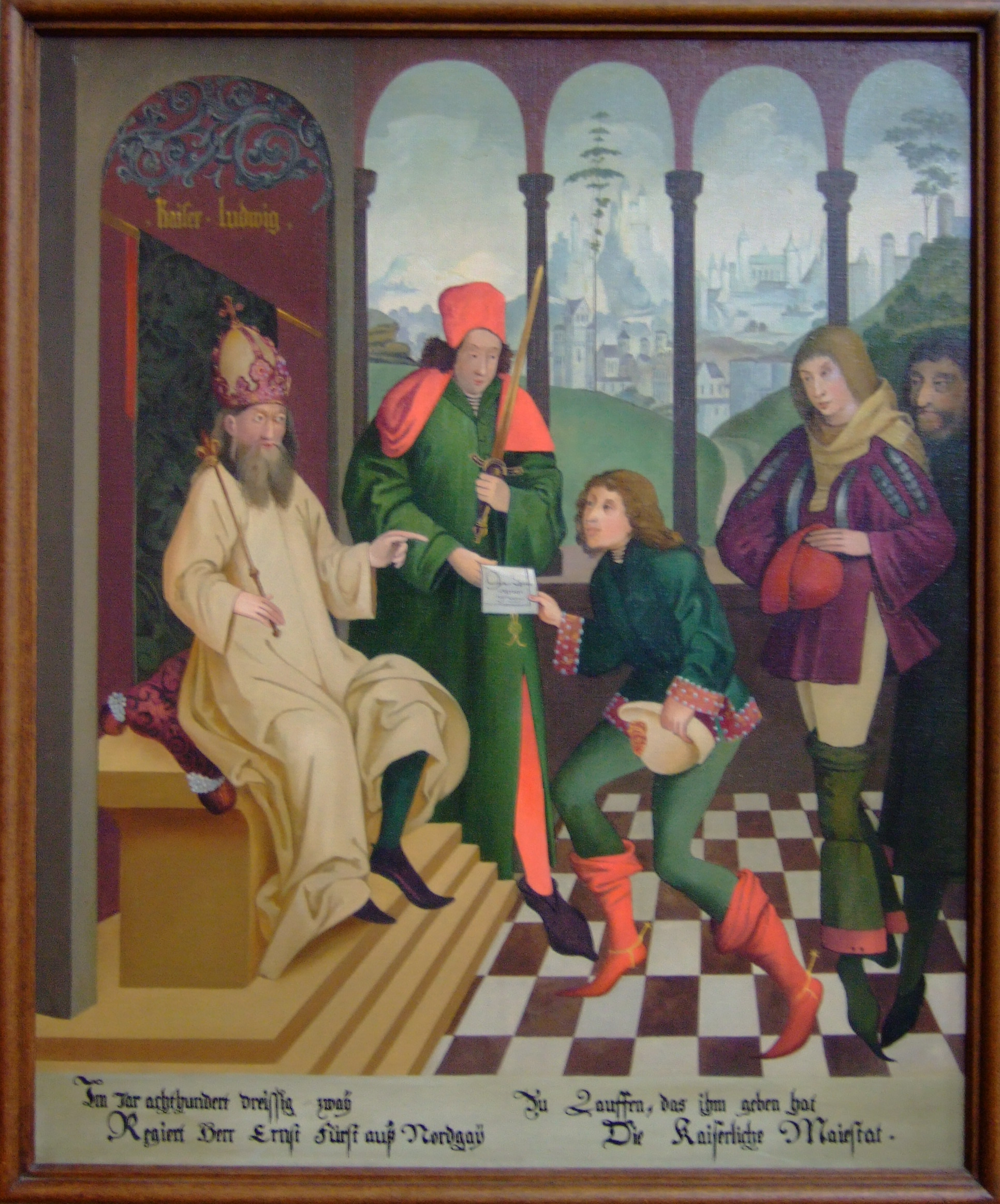
Painting in the Regiswindis Church depicting emperor Ludwig granting margrave Ernst the fiefdom of Lauffen in 832

=== 9th century to 11th century ===
In 832 Emperor Ludwig Louis the Pious granted the then unfortified village to his son-in-law Ernst, the margrave of Nordgau in the Upper Palatinate, on condition that the inhospitable place be suitably developed – it was the property of the Emperor, who intended to use it for hunting. The initial cultivation of the Neckar slopes and the first castle can be traced back to Ernst.

According to legend, the Graf's infant daughter, Regiswindis, was murdered by her wet nurse and the body thrown into the Neckar. After this incident, the margrave Ernst returned to his home in the Upper Palatinate and the village was transferred back to the emperor with effect from 861, before the expiration of the lease and the death of the Graf.

In 889, 923 and 993, various German emperors transferred their rule over the village to the Bishopric of Würzburg. In 1003, Henry II, Holy Roman Emperor called for the establishment of a convent in the village, which had meanwhile been fortified. A Benedictine convent was accordingly set up under the auspices of Bishop Heinrich von Würzburg.

=== High Middle Ages ===
The end of the 11th century saw the arrival of the Gaugrafen von Lauffen (Frankish earls) who were allied to the Bishopric of Worms and noble descendants of the Poppon tribe of Lauffen. They pressed ahead with the fortification of the settlement and of the castle. In around 1150, they had the rocks on the eastern riverbank cut back, thus creating the basis for a moated castle – the present-day "Pfalzgrafenburg". The three brothers – Heinrich II, Boppo V and Konrad II – all died without male issue. With the death of the last scion in 1218 or 1219, the house of Lauffen died out, although its coat of arms survives to this day as the arms of the District of Heilbronn. In the 13th century, the town once again reverted to the German Emperor (Holy Roman Emperor).

In 1227, the Holy Roman Emperor Frederick II mortgaged Lauffen, Sinsheim and Eppingen to Herman V of Baden. In the mortgage deed, Lauffen was first referred to as "civitas" (town with civic institutions). The upward designation to "town" is frequently dated as having taken place in the year 1234. The Margraves of Baden administered the town through a family of bailiffs. A church was built in 1227 to replace an existing chapel and dedicated to the now canonized Saint Regiswindis.

The families of the ruling aristocracy were beset with problems over complex inheritance disputes and mortgage debts. As a result, hegemony over the town changed frequently, transferring to (among others) the Dukes of Teck. In 1327, Lauffen was mortgaged to Württemberg. In 1346, Sir Albrecht (Ritter Albrecht Hofwarth) acquired town and castle from the Margraves of Baden for 3,000 heller. However, in 1361, he resold his acquisition to Graf Eberhard von Württemberg and his brother for double the purchase price. Due to the proximity of the Free Imperial City of Heilbronn, the rulers of Württemberg demanded a commitment of loyalty from the inhabitants of Lauffen.

=== Late Middle Ages and Peasants' War ===
The 15th century at Lauffen was characterized by conflicts over complex fishing and tithe rights which affected many of the inhabitants. The lake of Lauffen was created by Ulrich V, Count of Württemberg in 1454. In 1460, his troops were called upon to defend fishing and customs rights against Palatinate troops. However, the following year, the Palatinate Graf Friedrich gave an undertaking to stop attacks against various localities in Württemberg. Then, in 1469, a treaty between the Palatinate and Württemberg resolved the customs disputes over the transportation of timber along the River Murr.

In 1474 the first bridge at Lauffen was built over the Neckar thus bringing the entire customs duties for river traffic to the town. The bridge was destroyed by the flood of 1529 and rebuilt in 1532. A town hall was built and a weekly market established in 1480. Two years later, the bubonic plague caused the death of 1,300 inhabitants.

During the German Peasants' War, an 8,000-strong army of peasants set up camp between Lauffen and Gemmrigheim in 1525. Bowing to superior force, the town council sided with the peasants – as a result only the convent was sacked. On 13 May 1534, at the Battle of Lauffen, the 11,000 troops of Austria were outnumbered by those of the Rulers of Hesse, whose forces consisted of some 25,000 men. As a result of the victory over the Austrians, Ulrich, Duke of Württemberg regained his territory and led his subjects towards the Reformation. Lauffen was occupied for over a year in approximately 1547 by Imperial troops during the war of the Schmalkaldic League, then reverted to Württemberg. 1564 saw the return of the bubonic plague, which claimed some 800 victims. The plague returned in 1606, 1607 and 1626 although there were fewer fatalities.

=== Thirty Years' War ===
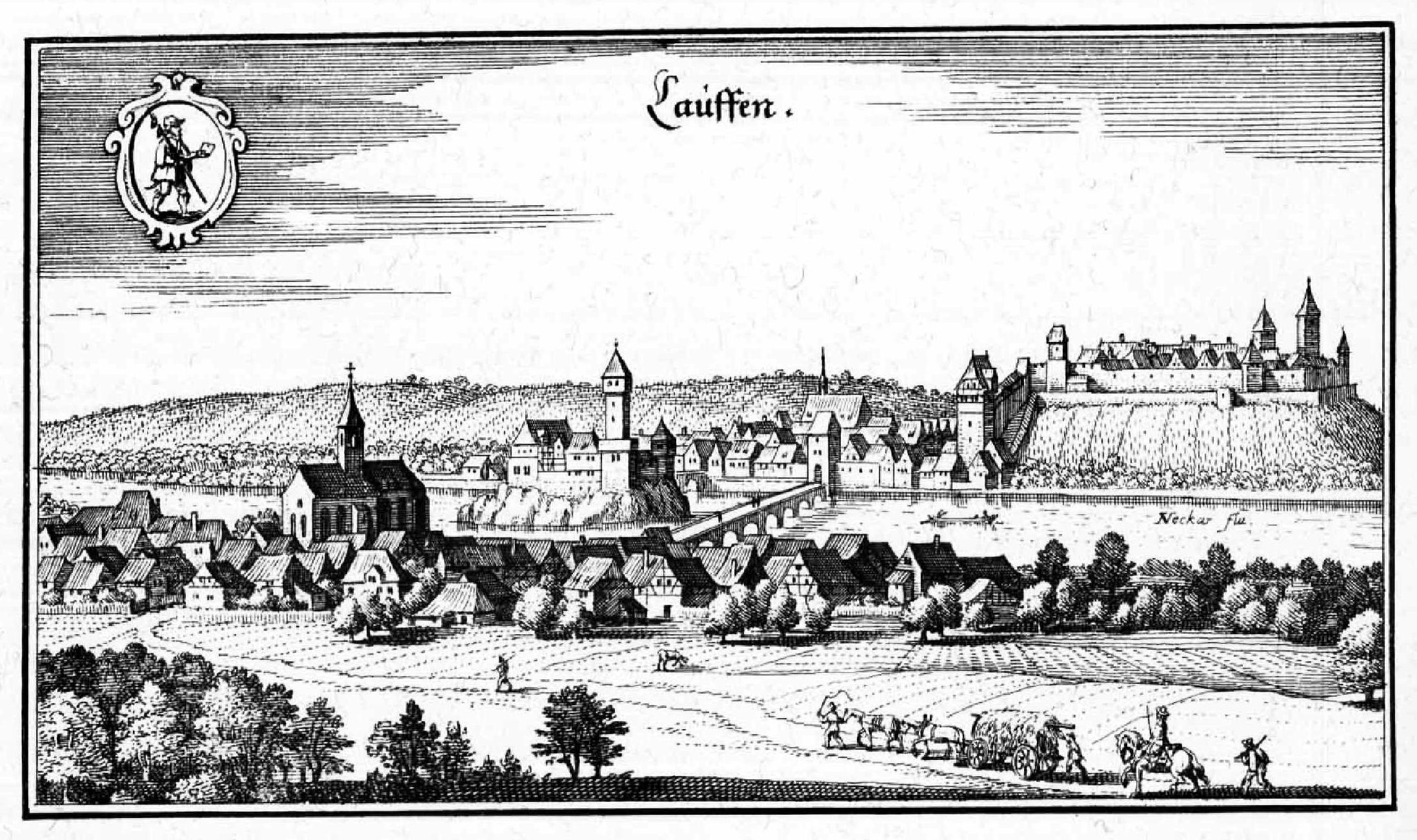
Lauffen C 1640. Illustration by Matthäus Merian's Topographia Germaniae

During the Thirty Years' War, Lauffen was the scene of several battles and troop movements. The bridge and the nearby ford proved to be of major strategic significance. In April 1622, a large force belonging to Wilhelm, Duke of Saxe-Weimar and George Frederick, Margrave of Brandenburg-Ansbach assembled at the bridge to engage the imperial troops. Battle was joined at Wimpfen early in May and resulted in victory for the imperial forces. After this defeat, two companies of the Margrave's troops and many Neckargartach farmers took refuge in Lauffen. The town was spared major fighting for several years, but almost 20 years of suffering were still to come.

In 1629, a large force of imperial troops moved through the town, to be followed in 1631 by troops of Lorraine. In 1634, Croatian soldiers plundered Lauffen and two days later the imperial forces returned. In November the last 16 head of cattle were confiscated. At Christmas 1634, Lauffen provided winter quarters for five transiting regiments. At Whitsun 1635, the Mühlheimische Kürassier-Regiment seized the entire winter crop, thus creating a famine which claimed 800 lives.

In 1636, Lauffen was sacked by a Colonel Liddaw and his regiment of cuirassiers. In the autumn of 1637, it was overrun by two different regiments – a state of affairs which caused a shortage of food during the winter and resulted in the deaths of 200 people. In 1638, it had to endure the presence of a company of Parischen troops; then, in May and again in September, it was once more descended upon by imperial forces. In the autumn, two regiments of cavalry looted the harvest and, at the beginning of December, three cavalry regiments sacked the town. At Christmas 1638, the imperial general staff took over Lauffen. By the end of that year, the population had fallen to just 30. The misery continued during 1639 with frequent occupations by troops.

The years 1640 to 1642 were comparatively quiet, but in 1643 French Weimar regiments were in occupation, along with the entire French general staff. The so-called "Weimar occupation" lasted until May 1643, when victory was achieved after three days of fighting by the Bavarian army under the command of Graf Fugger. In 1645, the town was again plundered by French and Hessian troops. Subsequently, the Bavarians moved back, but provisions were barely enough to feed them. Virtually all that remained were cabbages, beets and new wine.

A year later, Swedish troops joined the Bavarians and extensive defences were constructed. After the armistice of 1647 between France and Bavaria, the town's defences were razed to the ground. The Bavarians withdrew, to be replaced over the winter by a company of Weimar cavalry. With the failure of the armistice, a French garrison arrived and set about constructing more defences, which nevertheless became redundant with the conclusion of peace in 1648. For many years after the end of the war, and at frequent intervals, Lauffen would be taken over and occupied by troops.

At the end of the Thirty Years' War, the population was 155. The upper castle had been destroyed, the lower one severely damaged. The town's church was also badly damaged. In all, 270 houses were damaged and 452 acres (1.8 km^{2}) of vineyards, 1,239 acres (5.0 km^{2}) of fields and 50 acres (0.20 km^{2}) of meadows had been laid to waste.

=== The War with France ===
Since the political situation in the second half of the 17th century was far from stable, Eberhard III strengthened the fortifications around Lauffen with drawbridges and parapets as a defence against potential attacks by the French. Just a few years after the devastating Thirty Years' War, Lauffen was the scene of invasions for a second time. In 1674, the army of the Elector of Brandenburg crossed the Neckar on the way to Strasbourg, to be followed by the Lüneburg-Zellsche army. Upon the withdrawal of these forces, the Brandenburgers set up their headquarters at Isfeld. In May 1675, the imperial army, arriving from The Netherlands, crossed the river near Lauffen. In 1676, the town served as winter quarters for an imperial regiment of cuirassiers and, in 1679, for a company of cavalry from Lorraine. In 1688, the French army arrived, confiscating all the horses and destroying the bridge. During the following decade, the area witnessed more hostilities and was again occupied. Yet more looting occurred, along with the destruction of agricultural land. The population, which had increased between the two wars, was later decimated to 210 persons in 1697.

=== 18th century ===
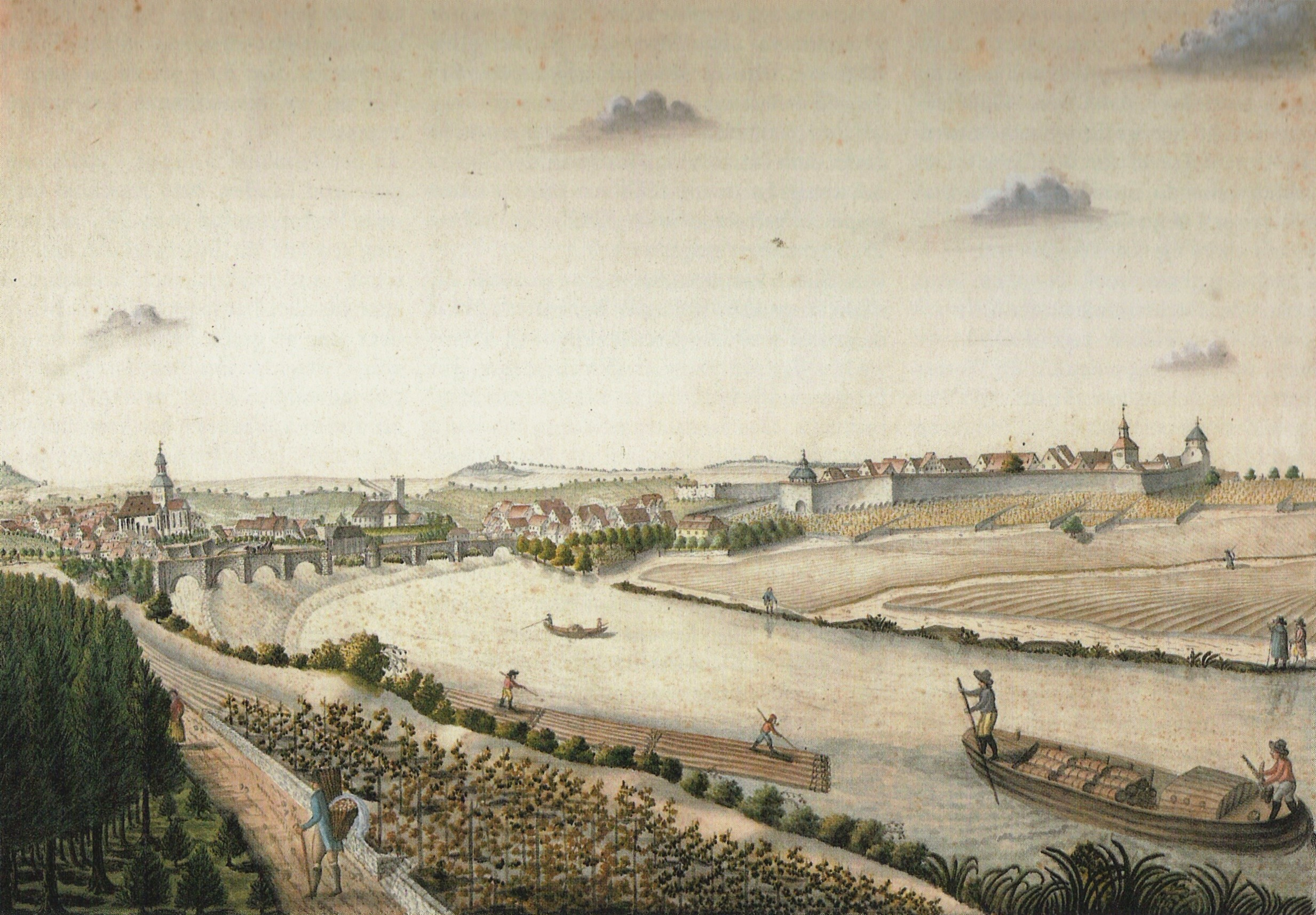
Lauffen from south-east; watercolour C 1800

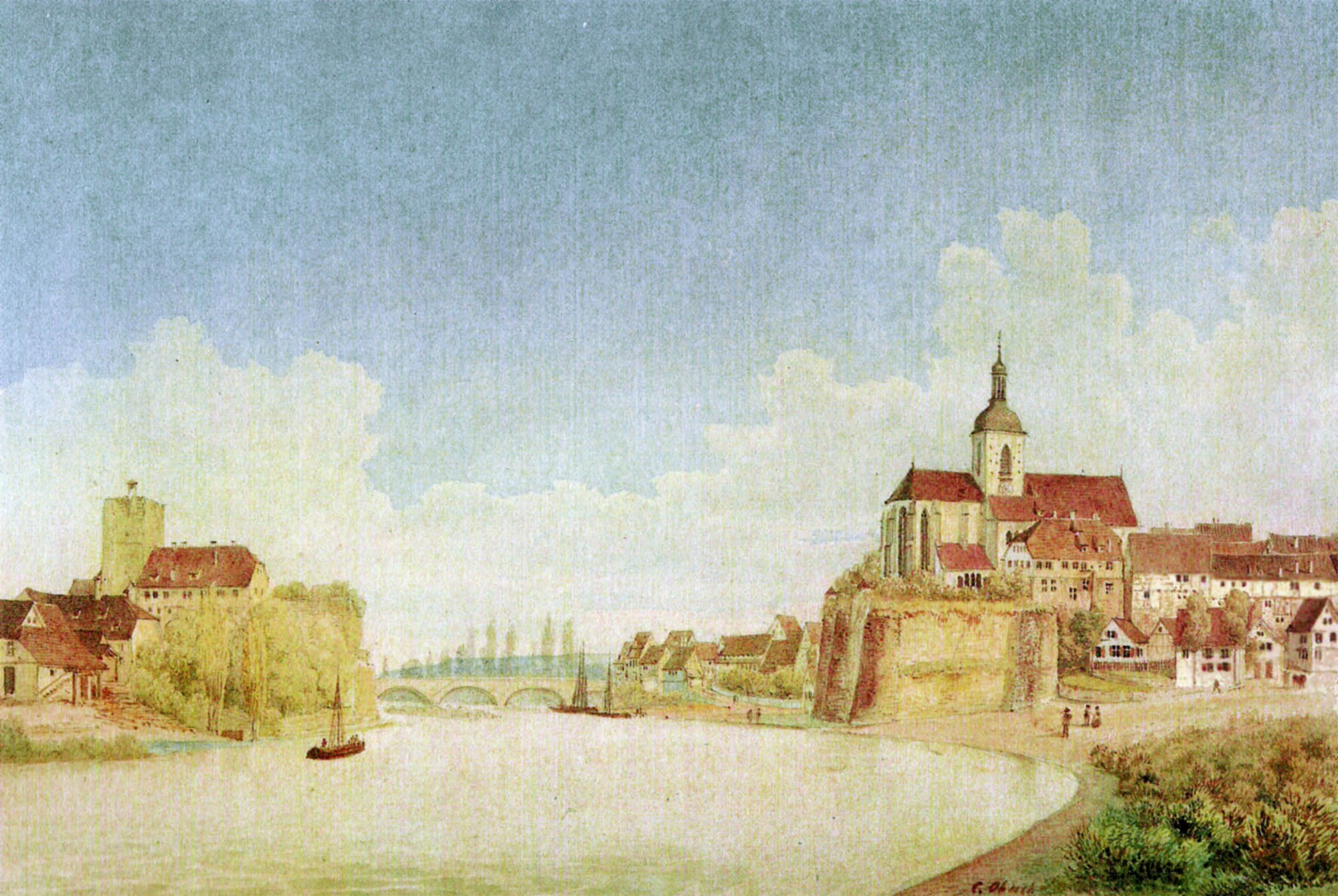
Lauffen, castle and Regiswindis Church from north-west; watercolour by Caspar Obach C 1850

The 18th century was also dominated by matters military. In 1704 the Anglo-Dutch cavalry crossed the Neckar at Lauffen, and in 1707, 2000 French horsemen sacked the town for a second time. 1709, a cuirassier regiment from Kürnbach was quartered there. However, more than 100 years after the outbreak of the Thirty Years' War, Lauffen was starting to recover from the damage which had been inflicted. In 1721, the town hall was rebuilt and in 1724 the temporarily repaired bridge dating from 1693 was converted into a covered suspension bridge. From 1728, a night watch was established in response to a spate of murders and robberies. In 1744, Lauffen was besieged by the imperial Bavarian army under Feldmarschall von Seckendorff and 1754 witnessed repeated returns of the French. There followed subsequent occupations by troops from Wimpfen and Anhalt.

In 1755, the previous protectorate structure was abolished and Lauffen became an "Oberamt" (administrative area). Thirty years later, 160 inhabitants died of typhus.

=== 19th century ===
The Oberamt Lauffen was wound up in 1808, and the town came under the jurisdiction of the Oberamt Besigheim. Two years later, the bridge over the Neckar was again renovated, the wooden elements being replaced by masonry. In 1817, the council bought the Neckar Island with the intention of using the site for a town hall. During the 19th century, emphasis was placed on agriculture. The lake of Lauffen was drained in 1820, thus producing 200 acres (0.8 km^{2}) of additional land. With the lake gone, the inhabitants lost a rich source of food but, on the other hand, the water had also been the cause of fevers.

Wine growing was improved by abandoning unprofitable varieties. The main variety became Pinot blanc. The town planted more than 2,000 fruit trees within its boundaries and countless willows along the banks of the Neckar. Agriculture continued to increase in importance.

From 2000 inhabitants in 1800, the population increased to approximately 4000 in 1850. The section of railway between Stuttgart and Heilbronn was completed in 1847, giving rise to the construction of buildings around the railway station. Following a fire on 14 October 1861, a volunteer fire brigade was formed on 19 November of the same year. In 1889, the second shaft of the railway tunnel (584 m) was completed between Kircheim am Neckar and Lauffen, thus removing a major bottleneck on the Franconia Railway from Heilbronn to Stuttgart. The year 1891 saw the world's first long-distance transmission of alternating three-phase electric current. This important technical achievement – a link between Lauffen and Frankfurt Main – is described in the section 'Economy and infrastructure' below.

=== 20th century ===
In 1914, two districts (Lauffen-Stadt and Lauffen-Dorf) were merged to create the new town of Lauffen am Neckar. The new town council marked the occasion by planting a lime tree in the terraced garden in front of the Pfalzgrafenburg castle. This tree stands opposite another lime at the Regiswindis Church on the other bank, the two trees thus symbolising unity.

Of the soldiers who served in the First World War, 189 failed to return. A war memorial was erected in their honour in front of the town hall in 1922. This was removed in 1949 to make way for a widening of the canal, and to enable the plaque bearing the names of the fallen to be set into the wall of the old cemetery alongside another dedicated to the even greater number of victims of the Second World War.

In the mid-1930s, work was started on the construction of a by-pass canal for the Neckar. This new canal had the effect of making the rocks of the Pfalzgrafenburg into an island once more. For a time, the cliff was linked to the town via a millrace which had been artificially created, and the Neckar sped in front of the cliffs and the bridge over rocks which had been placed there to produce rapids. (Pictures dating from 1640 and 1800 provide an interesting comparison.) The building of the canal was given high priority – several houses and even the first commercial three-phase power station were demolished. The original generator is now on display at the Deutsches Museum in Munich. Nearby, the Oskar von Miller Strasse (the westerly access road to the cement works) is a reminder of the power station's previous location. Electricity has since been generated at the dam further upstream. Parallel with the construction of the canal came the laying of a narrow gauge railway for the transportation of stone along the right bank of the river between the Lauffen cement works and the quarry at Neckarwestheim. The railway ceased operation in 1984, with the rails later removed to create a new footpath and cycle way. The engine is preserved on a playground near the old bridge beside the former railway track. The quarry is now the site of the Neckarwestheim Nuclear Power Plant (GKN). Between 1935 and 1938, work took place on the so-called 'Neckar-Enz Line' between Eberbach and Unterriexingen. This was a series of fortifications designed to resist a possible attack from the west. Eleven bunkers were constructed in the Lauffen sector, none of which had any impact on the end of the war.

There are two locks at Lauffen, both upstream of the castle. The first was constructed between 1938 and 1945 – the second between 1950 and 1951.

Following boundary change legislation in 1938, the administrative area known as the Oberamt Besigheim was dissolved and Lauffen became part of the Landkreis Heilbronn (district of Heilbronn).

During the Second World War the town suffered 37 air raids, this number being partly influenced by its proximity to the decoy target known as 'Brasilien', which was laid out to look like the main railway station at Stuttgart. On 13 April 1944, an allied bomber formation was returning to base having failed to bomb its primary and secondary targets (Nuremberg and Stuttgart) when it was attacked by a German fighter and forced to jettison its load over Lauffen. The town escaped serious damage and casualties from the bombs, which were dropped at random and in some cases unprimed. Most fell in fields or the river although some dropped on the Sonnenstrasse, the Brückenstrasse, the old cemetery and in the vicinity of the cement works and St Martin's Church. There were 59 fatalities including a number of forced labourers. The then mayor was criticised for not having sounded the air raid warning. Secondary targets for the bombers had been in northern Württemberg, Hesse or the Ruhr. As was so often the case, a return to base with the bomb load had not been included in the fuel calculations. The bombing of Lauffen can thus be regarded as the sacrifice of a pawn – a sacrifice in favour of a city.

On 20 June 1959, there was a serious accident at Lauffen when a public service bus operated by the Deutsche Bundesbahn crashed into an express train on the Tübingen-Würzburg (via Stuttgart) route. At the time, this accident was the worst since the Second World War, killing 45 and seriously injuring a further 27. The cause of the accident was attributed to human error on the part of the level-crossing keeper; the level-crossing has since been replaced by an underpass. A commemorative plaque was erected in memory of those who lost their lives.

== Religion ==
Following the Battle of Lauffen in 1534, the town became the first in Württemberg to embrace the Reformation. A reference to the first Protestant vicar, Hieronymus Hailbrunner, occurs in 1546 but he was no doubt already in office before this date. Since then, a majority of the town's worshippers has been of the Protestant faith. A Roman Catholic congregation did not exist until 1946. The Protestant congregation numbers some 6,000; there are approximately 3,000 Roman Catholics, some of whom are in Neckarwestheim. There is also a New Apostolic Church and congregation in the town.

== Politics ==
=== District council ===
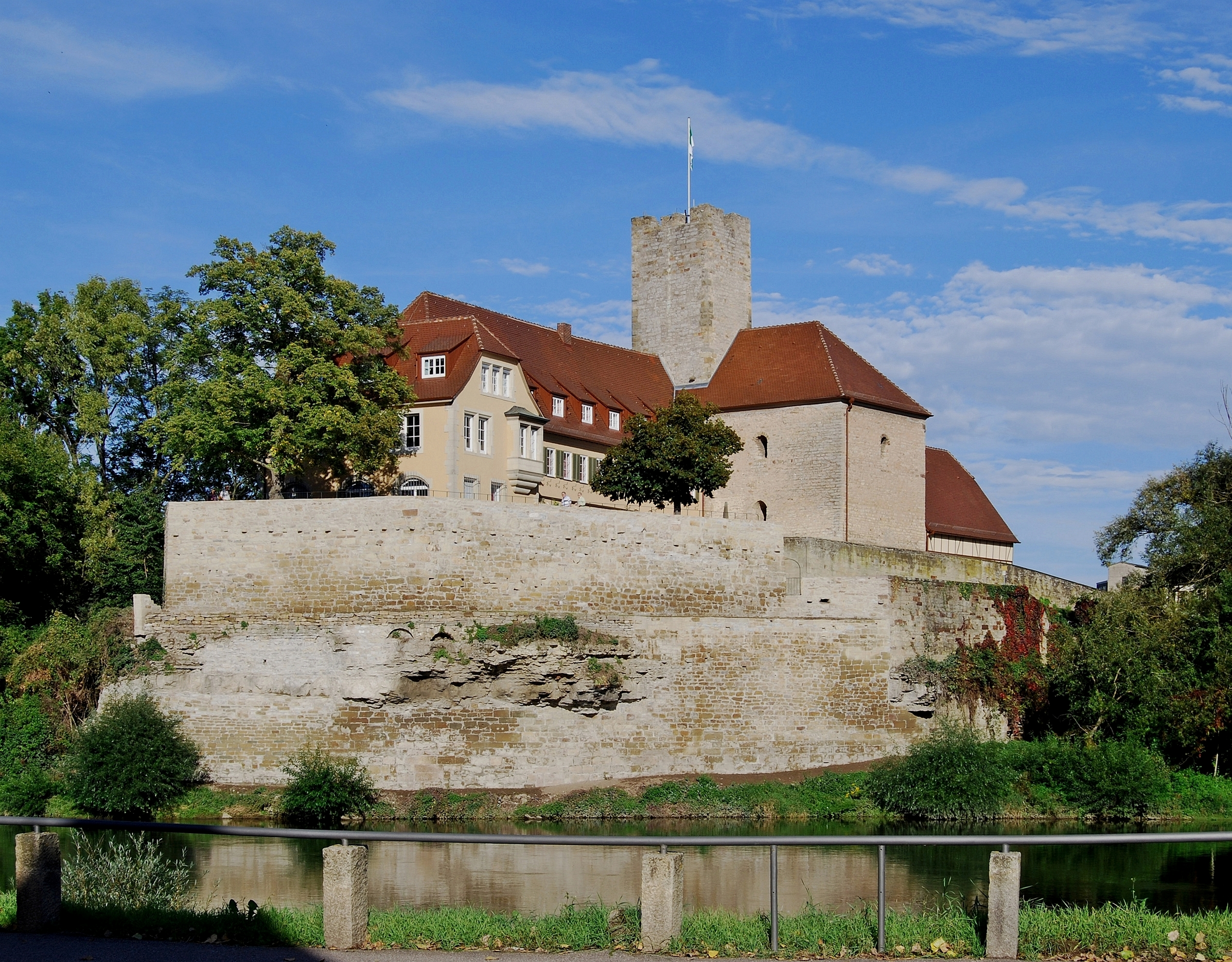
Former castle, present town hall

Following the municipal election of 7 June 2009, the district council of Lauffen has 22 seats. The election result is as follows:

CDU	8 Sitze	(34.21%)
FW Lauffen	4 Sitze	(18.67%)
FDP/DVP	4 Sitze	(17.64%)
SPD	4 Sitze	(17.21%)
GRÜNE	2 Sitze	(12.28%)

The mayor is also a member of the district council and its chairman.

=== Arms and flag ===
Blazon: Argent a messenger vested Vert in shoes Gules, holding in his dexter hand an envelope of the field sealed of the third and in his sinister hand a spear of the same headed Azure.

The town's colours are green and white.

Lauffen originally bore the coat of arms of the founders of the town, the Grafen von Lauffen (the Earls of Lauffen). This was a clawless eagle (cp. the present arms of the district of Heilbronn). From 1220 to 1346, the town was a possession of Baden, and in 1311 the arms of Baden first appeared in a Lauffen seal. The present coat of arms, one of the type which alludes to its owner, was first verified in a seal for the year 1464. Drawings of the arms in the natural colours survive from the year 1575, although the background of the shield sometimes appears tinged in gold rather than silver.

=== Twin towns – Sister cities ===
Lauffen am Neckar is twinned with:-

- the French municipality La Ferté-Bernard in the Département Sarthe (since 1974) and
- the German town Meuselwitz in Altenburger Land, Thuringia (since 1990).

== Buildings ==
- Town Hall and Museum: This former castle of the Grafen (Earls) of Lauffen was built in the 11th century. Destroyed during the Thirty Years' War, it was rebuilt after 1648 as the seat of the governor. The castle's Roman keep survives. The structure has served as the town hall from 1818 and has since been subject to frequent alterations. The town's museum in the convent yard was rebuilt in 1923 from the remains of the previous convent church. It is now the home of exhibitions devoted to the history of Lauffen and Friedrich Hölderlin.

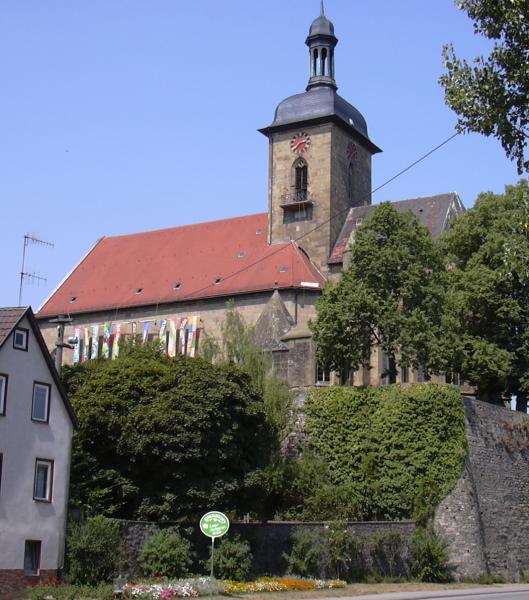
Regiswindis Church

*Regiswindis Church: The rebuilding of the church in its present form was well underway by 1567 after a fire had destroyed all but the choir three years previously. The church dates from 1227, when it was dedicated to Saint Regiswindis, but previous structures (St Martin's Church) date back to 741. Fragments of a Mount of Olives painting C 1507 by Hans Seyfer survive on the exterior of the choir.

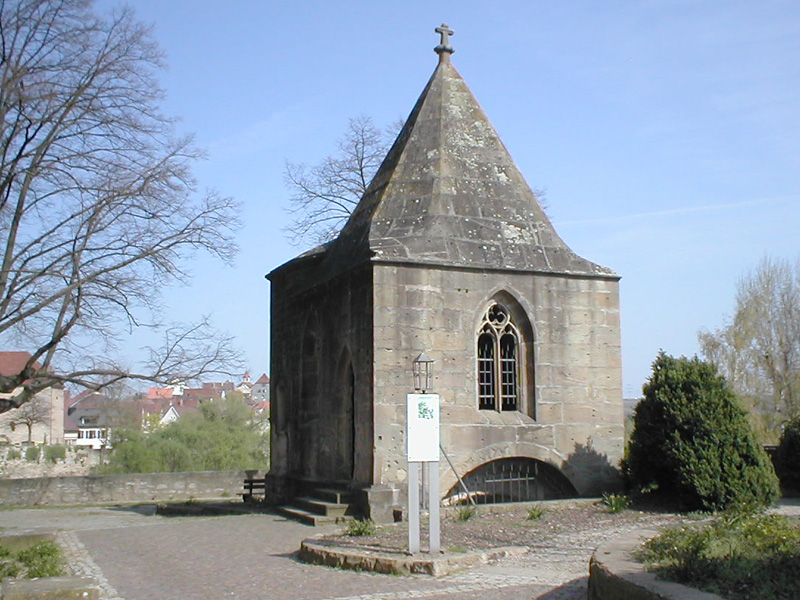
*Regiswindis Chapel. At the left of the picture can be seen one of the two lime trees on opposite sides of the River Neckar. Planted in 1914, these symbolise the unity of the town.

Regiswindis Chapel: Originally a graveyard chapel dedicated to Saint Ann, its crypt served as a charnel house. In 1901, the piles of bones were collected and buried. The stone sarcophagus containing the remains of Regiswindis were transferred to the chapel in 1882, at which point the building acquired its present name.

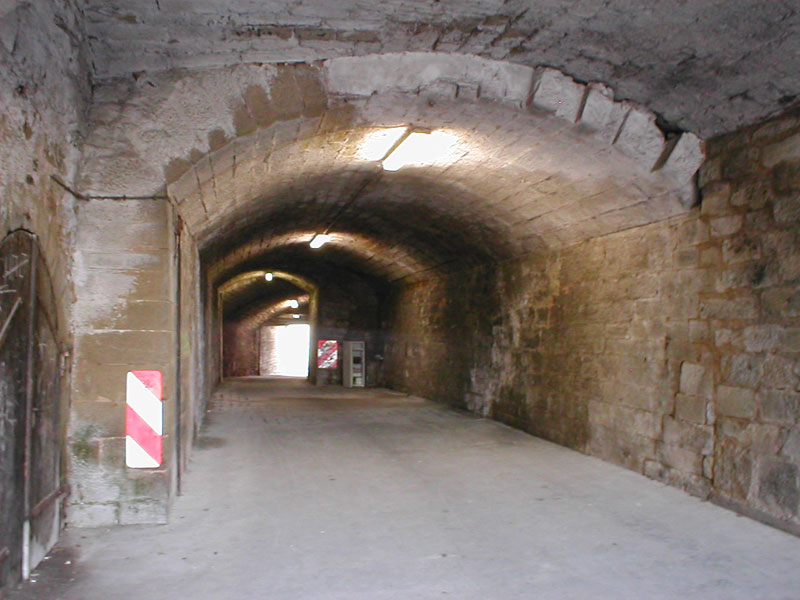
Grabengasse (moat lane)

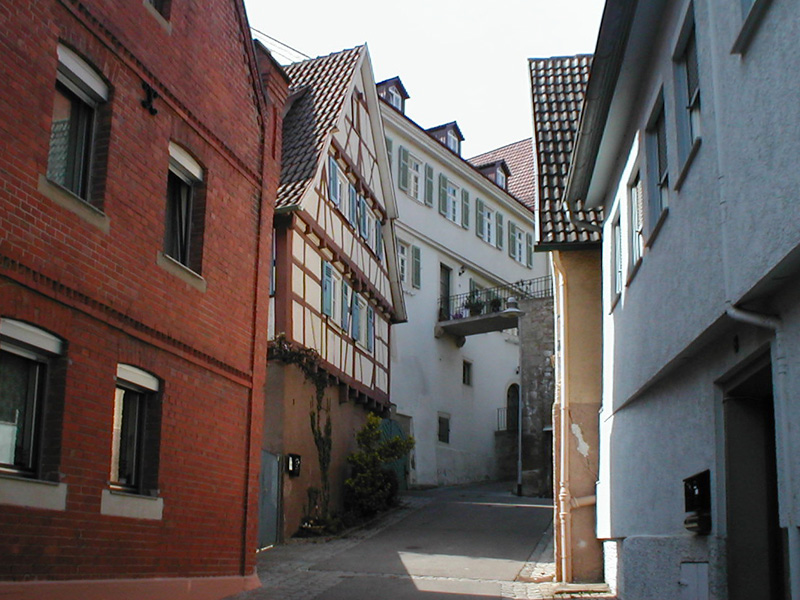
Kirchbergstraße

*There are many historic buildings in the town centre, including dwellings in the baroque style dating from the 18th century, and those associated with the Kirchberg, which include an old bake house. The curious Grabengasse (moat lane) winds its way by the Kirchberg. This lane is part of the town's original moat which has been overbuilt with timber-framed houses. At one time it was the route for river traffic, which included even motorised craft.

- The pedestrianised area known as Städtle is also worth a visit. This consists mainly of well-preserved 15th-century houses built in the traditional timber-framed style. Significant are the Erkerhaus (bay-fronted house), the Alte Kelter (old winery) the Vogtshof (governor's residence) as well as the town wall with its two gates – the 13th century Heilbronner Tor (Heilbronn Gate) and the Neues Heilbronner Tor (New Heilbronn Gate) and the Gefängnisturm (Gaol tower), both of which date from 1772.
- The Martinskirche (Martin's Church) in the Lauffen-Stadt district, erroneously named thus since the middle of the 19th century, was built in honour of St Nicholas in around 1200. Not an independent church, it was ministered by priests from Lauffen-Dorf. Following the Reformation the chapel fell into disrepair and became a store for hay and oats.
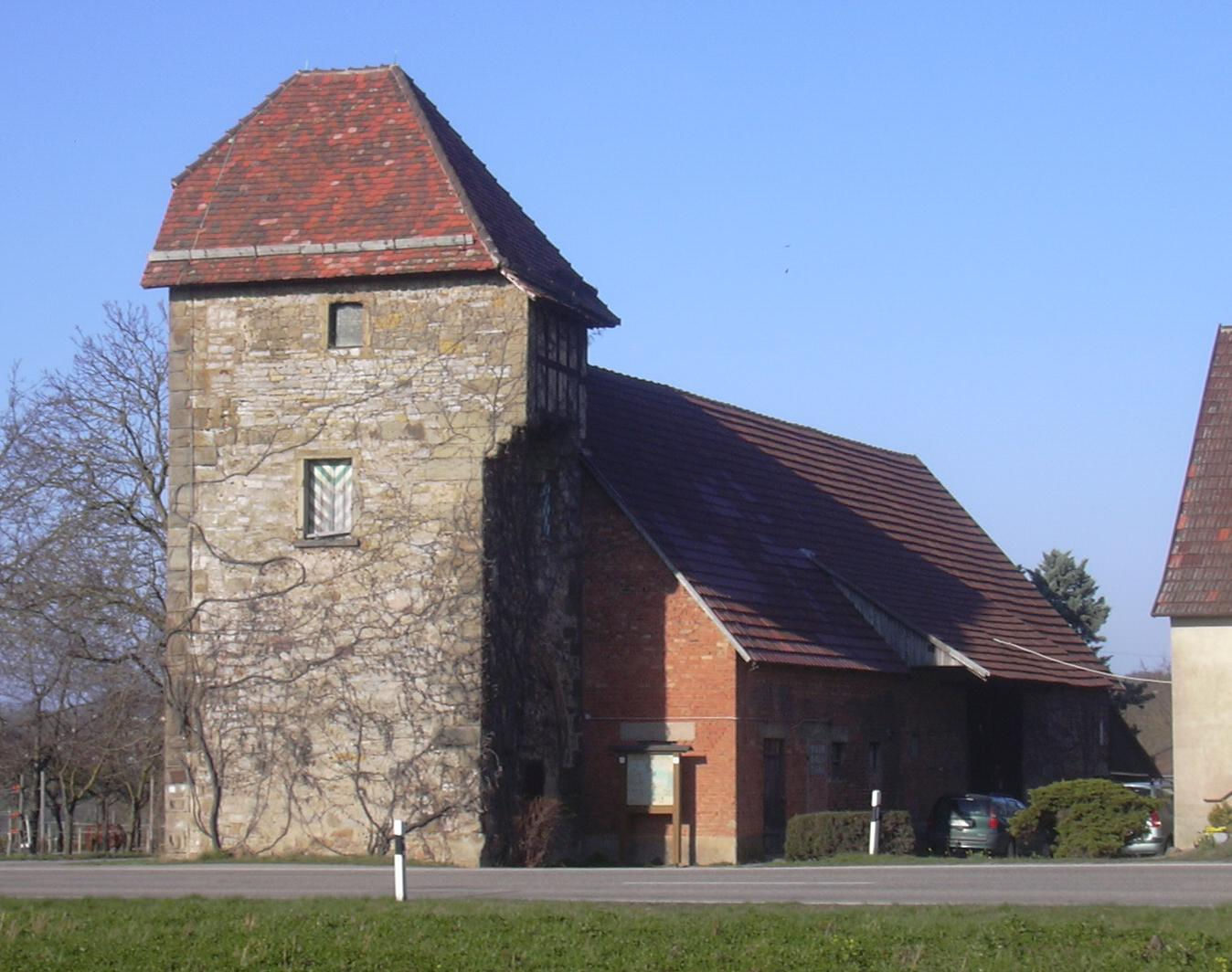
  Lauffen's Landturm
  The Martinskirche was renovated in 1883–4, badly damaged during the Second World War but renovated yet again in 1949 and 1977–78. This chapel, with its single nave, has been used for services since 1978. In 1977–78, several layers of wall paintings were discovered during renovation work.
- The Lauffener Rustica Villa is located out of town on the road to Ilsfeld. This Roman villa was excavated in 1978 and has been partially restored. Also on the Ilsfeld road can be seen the remains of the Württemberg Landgraben (defensive moat) and the Landturm (tower), which was formerly a customs post.

== Clubs and societies ==
The various clubs and societies include cultural organisations such as a music school and choirs, sports bodies like a rowing club and a swimming club, and parent-teacher associations linked to local schools. In all there are over 70 such bodies: a complete list, together with links, is published on the town's website at

== Economy and infrastructure ==
=== Electricity ===
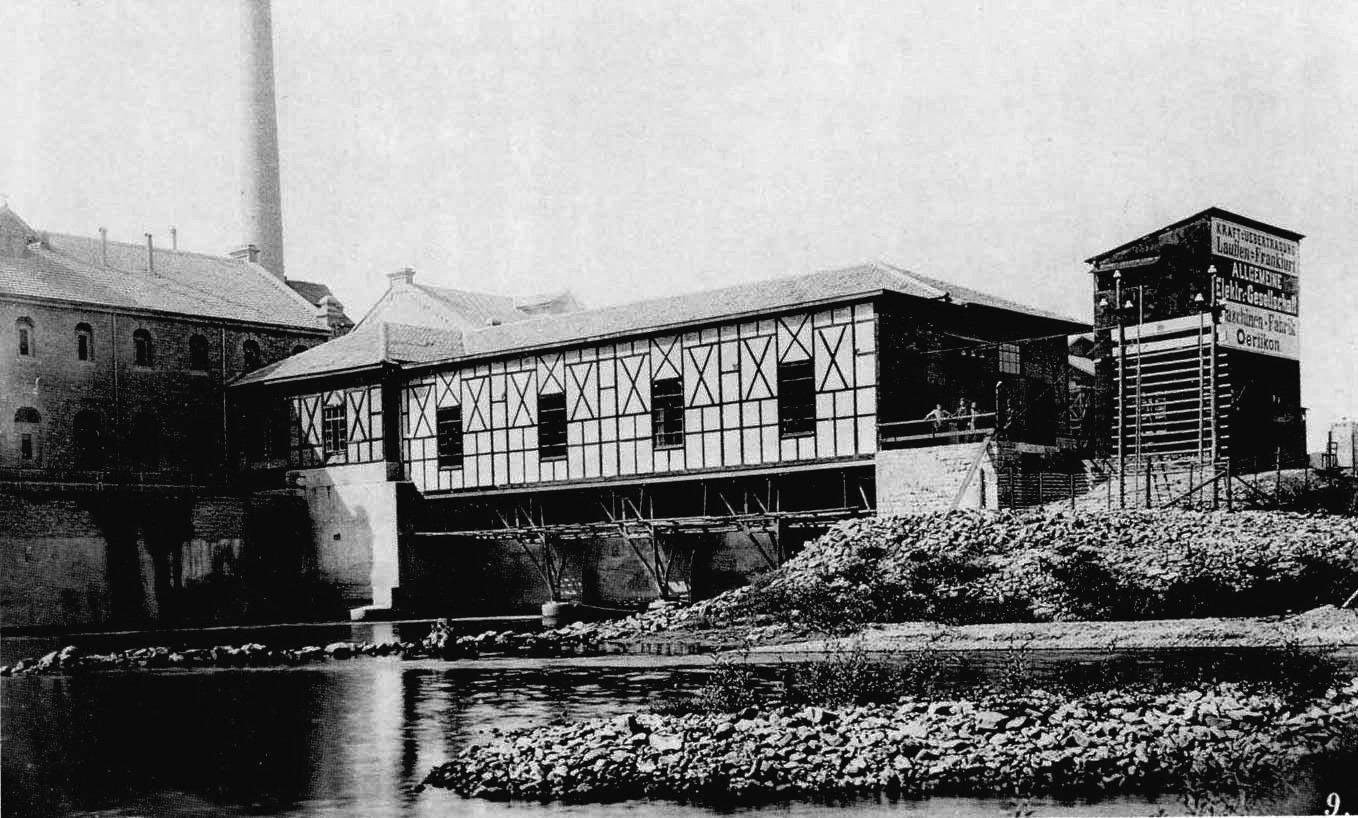
Former power station on the Mühlgraben (millrace)

Lauffen am Neckar was the birthplace of alternating current transmission. For the International Electro-Technical Exhibition - 1891 in Frankfurt am Main, Dolivo-Dobrowolsky and Oskar von Miller constructed a three-phase high-voltage transmission line which came into operation on 24 August 1891. For this, a three-phase alternator made by Maschinenfabrik Oerlikon was installed in the cement works at Lauffen, with an overhead cable to carry the current under 15 kV to Frankfurt – a distance of 175 km (109 mi). The entrance to the exhibition was lit with 1000 light bulbs and the middle section surmounted by an arch bearing the inscription "Power Transmission Lauffen – Frankfurt 175 km". At the same time, an artificial waterfall some 6 m high was powered by electric current. At the close of the exhibition, transmission of current from the Lauffen three-phase alternator was maintained to Heilbronn, which thus became the first town in the world to receive a regular supply of electricity from a remote location. To this day, the name of the local electricity utility, ZEAG (Zementwerk Lauffen – Elektrizitätswerk Heilbronn AG), is a reminder of this achievement.

=== Wine-growing ===
The Lauffen winemaking cooperative was founded in 1935 and, with an annual yield of some six million litres and sales of approximately 22 million euros, is one of the largest high-quality cooperatives in the wine region of Württemberg. The cooperative has some 600 members, the area of vines covering approximately 570 hectares. Quality wines marketed under the name "Katzenbeißer" are especially well known. In addition to those forming part of the cooperative, other growers cultivate and market their own wines independently. The vineyards at Lauffen are part of the greater Kirchenweinberg area of the Württemberg lowland winegrowing region. An annual event is the selection of Württemberg's 'Weinkönigin' (Wine Queen), whose role it is to represent the winegrowing industry at events not only in Württemberg, but also throughout Germany and elsewhere in Europe. A prerequisite for the title holder is a knowledge of wine and the wine-production process. Girls from Lauffen have twice been crowned Wine Queen: for 1984–1985, the choice was Karoline Rembold (subsequent married name, Steinle); for 1972–1974, the crown went to Ilse Eberbach (subsequent married name, Riederer).

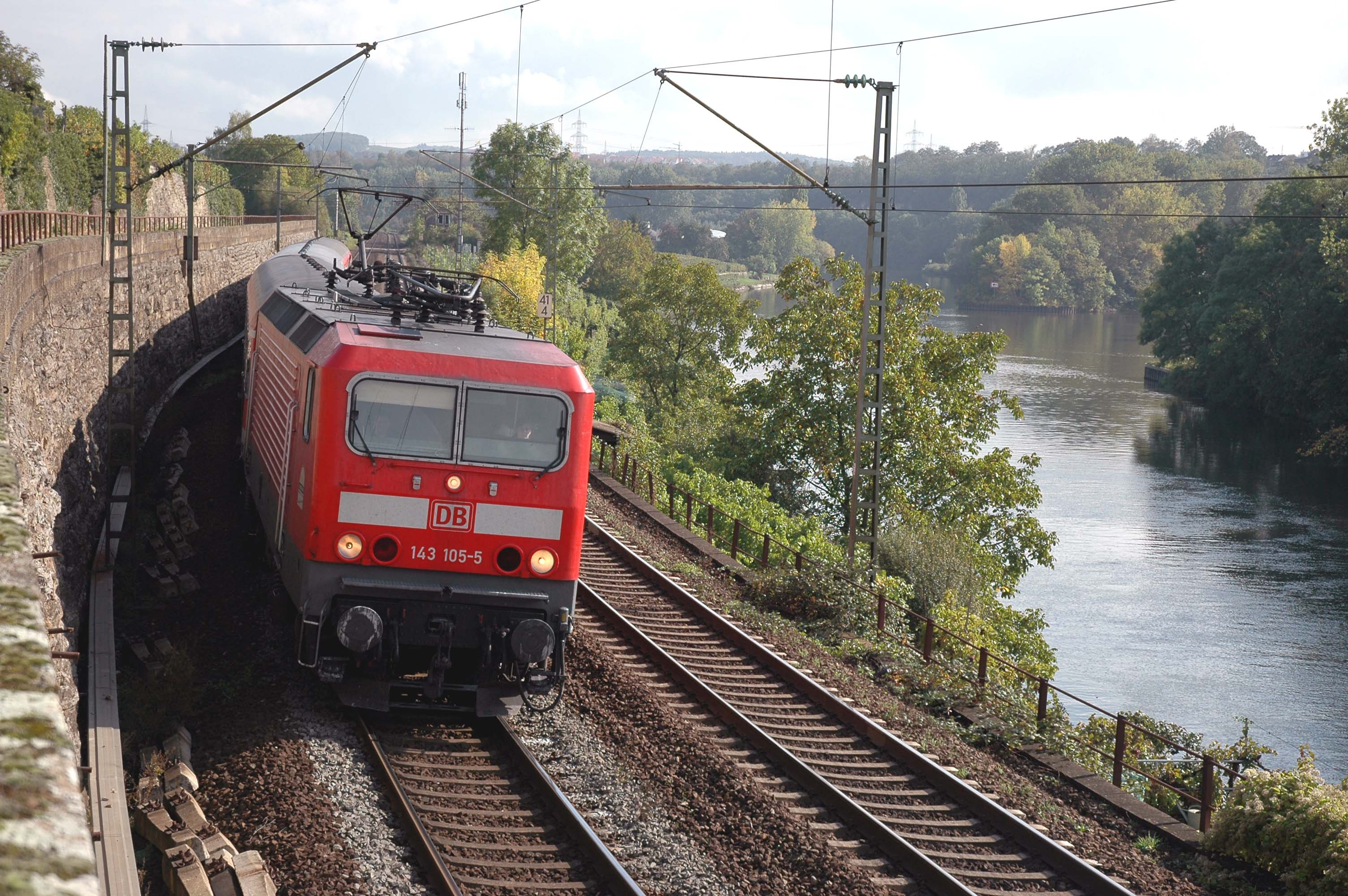
RegionalBahn from Heilbronn to Stuttgart at the Neckar near Lauffen

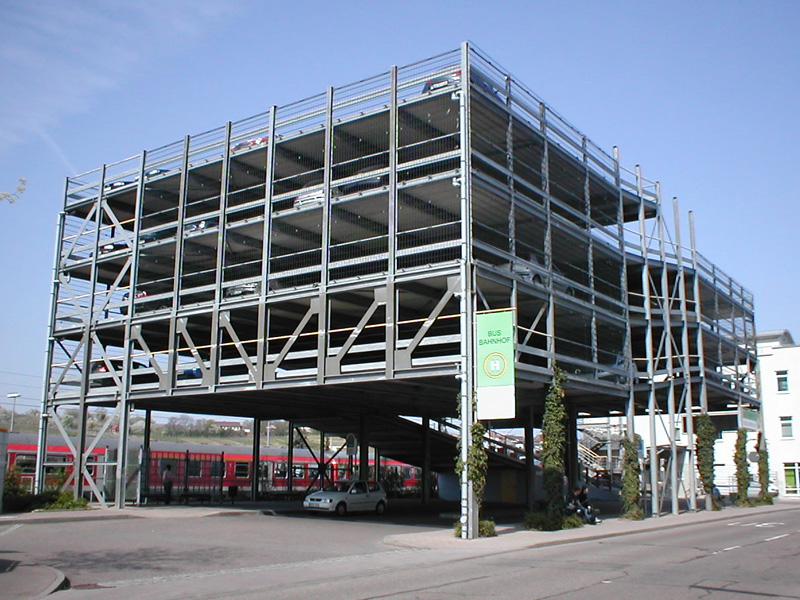
Bus station and car park for rail commuters in Lauffen

=== Communications ===
==== Rail ====
Lauffen is situated on the Franconia Railway from Stuttgart to Würzburg. There are two connections every hour via the RegionalBahn trains to Stuttgart and Heilbronn. Until 1995, Lauffen was the terminus of the Zabergäubahn to Leonbronn. Passenger services ceased operation in 1986.

==== Road ====
The link to the motorway network is via the B27. The nearest motorway junction is at the A81 near Ilsfeld.

=== Large employer ===
Schunk is one of the largest manufacturers of toolholding and automation equipment in the world. The company has a worldwide workforce of 1,440. Of these, 770 are in Lauffen and the nearby village of Hausen.

== Public Institutions ==
Lauffen has a notary public and a police station – the latter is responsible for the south-western sector of the district of Heilbronn and for the valley of the River Lein to the west of the city of Heilbronn. The town's Volunteer Fire Brigade has 90 active members. In addition to its fire-fighting duties, it also provides emergency rescue services and renders assistance in the event of flooding. The Ulrichsheide open-air swimming pool was reopened in 1995 after refurbishment.

=== Education ===
Lauffen is a school centre for the surrounding municipalities. The various schools are:

- Herzog-Ulrich-Grundschule
- Hölderlin-Grundschule
- Hölderlin-Hauptschule
- Hölderlin-Realschule
- Hölderlin-Gymnasium
- Erich-Kästner-Schule
- Kaywald-Schule

The town also has a public library.

== Notable people ==
=== Sons and daughters of the town ===
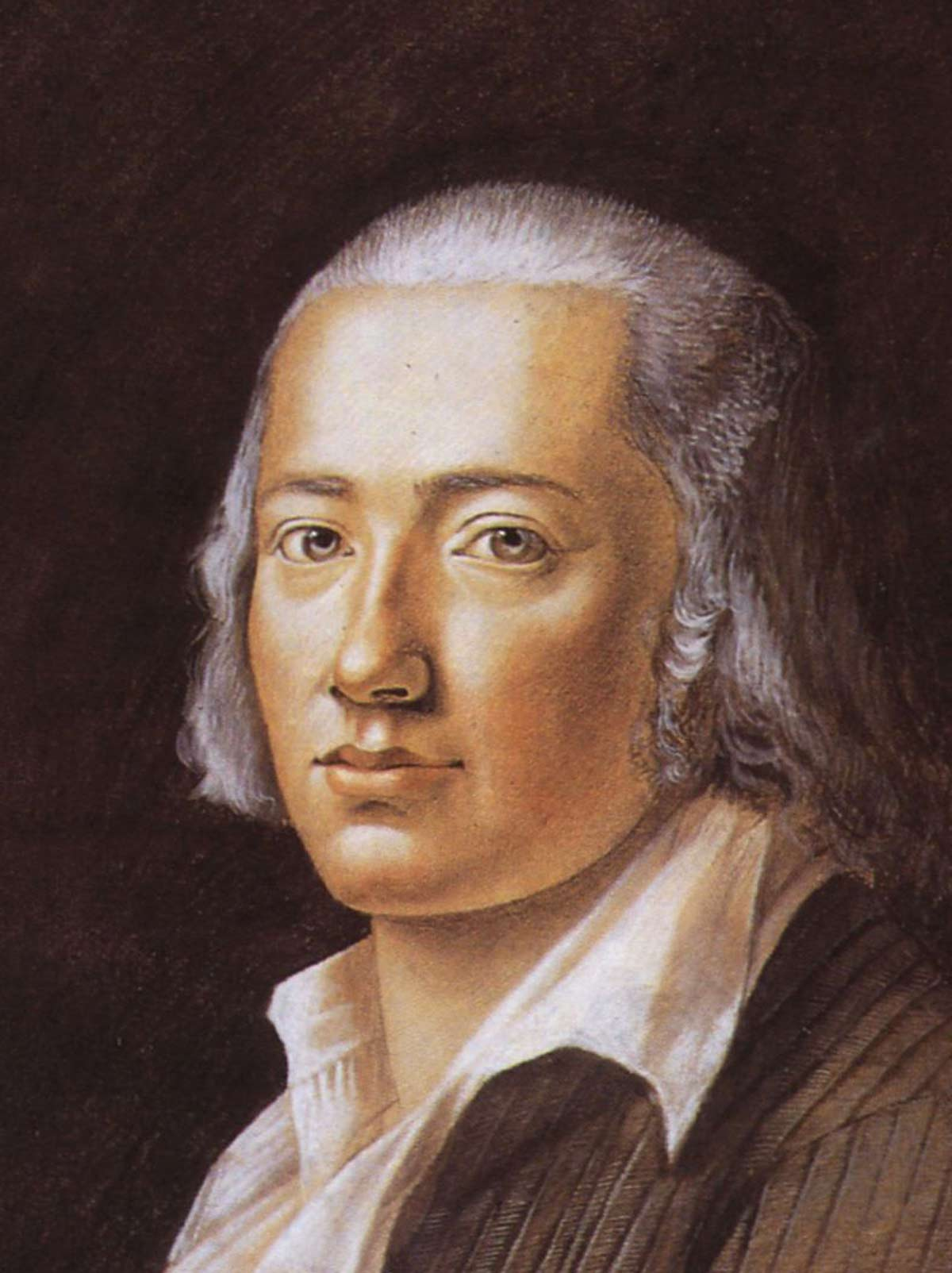
Friedrich Hölderlin, 1792

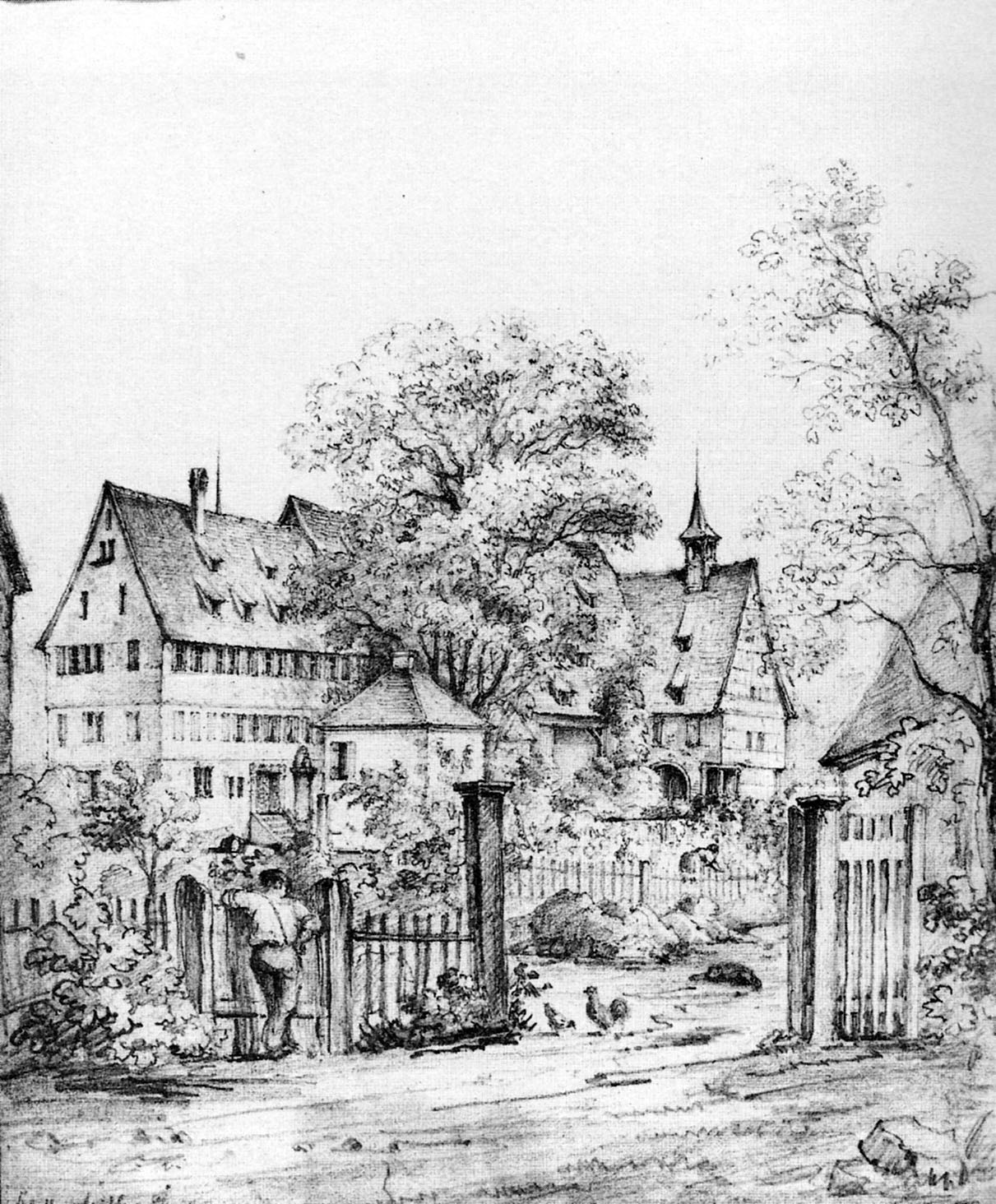
Hölderlin's house of birth, drawing 1840

- Regiswindis, (DE Wiki) (* ca.832; † ca.839 in Lauffen on the Neckar), local saint
- Rudolph Christ (1750–1833), potter, emigrated to Philadelphia aged 3
- Friedrich Hölderlin (1770–1843), a German poet and philosopher.
- August Specht (1849–1923), natural history artist and painter.
- Ulrich Schiefer (born 1952), rural and development sociologist and anthropologist.
- Ulrich Gebauer (born 1956), actor.
- Holger Walter (born 1968), German sculptor
- Klaus Graf, (DE Wiki) (born 1964), jazz saxophonist
- Udo Riglewski (born 1966), tennis player
- Uwe Wagschal (born 1966), political scientist and academic
