= Holger Walter =

German sculptor (born 1968)

Holger Walter (born September 26, 1968, in Lauffen am Neckar) is a German sculptor based in Karlsruhe and Berlin.

== Early life and education ==
Holger Walter's birthplace stood on the site of a former convent where the famous German poet Friedrich Hölderlin was born. His father (1933–1980) came from the eastern Oberlausitz Silesia and was Heimatvertriebener after World War II. Walter grew up among idyllic vineyards with a brother and a sister. His home was located quite near to the Neckarwestheim Nuclear Power Plant which was built in an old quarry at that time.

He was trained as a stonemason in a quarry and after that studied sculpture at the State Academy of Fine Arts in Karlsruhe from 1990 to 1996. Walter was awarded a DAAD -scholarship to Japan and worked at Tama Art University in Tokyo from 1997 to 1998. He gave lectures at the HafenCity University Hamburg and the Tama Art University Tokyo. He married the Japanese pianist Tomoyo Okamoto in 2001. They have three children.

== Work ==
His works are rooted in complex perceptions. These include observing topographic and geological events and experiencing the forces of nature, such as water and ice, as well as their uncontrollable power represented by earthquakes and volcanoes. His works are also influenced by issues related to Heimat and identity, digital revolution and poetry.

Having grown up in the same town as Hölderlin, his childhood experiences were similar to the poet's, sharing images and impressions. Many of his works can be considered a sort of dialogue with Hölderlin.

Holger Walter works with resistant materials which he transforms through clear-cut radical interventions. Stone sculptures preserve their natural skin and crust, so that they look like sections hewn out of a bigger framework. He employs different types of stones from various regions around the world and sometimes even other materials such as glass and steel. His creative output extends beyond sculpture and includes drawing and frottage whose essence is similar to that of his sculptures: soaring motifs break free from the ground thus bringing a poetic element into his work. A decisive attitude and a peculiar formal language are typical of all his artistic expressions.

In recent years he has created drifting sculptures (1997–2002) in Japan / Germany and works exploring different themes such as tunnel, cave, section (2003–2008), excavations, hidden spaces (2009–2010), waves, currents, rhythms, ice age stones and inner dimension (since 2011).

Approaches to Hölderlin's imagery

In 2013 he exhibited the outcomes of his artistic dialogues with Hölderlin's poems and their common birthplace in Lauffen am Neckar at the Goethe-Institut Nancy, France. Through visual means he tries to connect with Hölderlin's poetry and pay tribute to his highest artistic achievements. In this connection, senses are essential to approach the poet's thought and imagery. In 2013 he created works inspired by fragments of Hölderlin's river poems, such as the enchained current and the rage of currents.

== Solo exhibitions (selection) ==
- 2013 Goethe-Institut Nancy / France
- 2009 Seitz & Partner Gallery Berlin
- 2007 Inga Kondeyne Gallery Berlin
- 2003 Knecht Gallery Karlsruhe
- 1997 Kunstverein Wilhelmshöhe Ettlingen

== Collections ==
- Staatliche Kunsthalle Karlsruhe
- Musée du design et d'arts appliqués contemporains, MUDAC, Lausanne / Switzerland
- Seolbong Sculpture Park Icheon / South Korea

== Literature ==
- Hans Gercke: Der Berg, Heidelberger Kunstverein, Kehrer, Heidelberg, 2002, p. 528,529, ISBN 3-933257-99-9
- Axel Heil, Harald Klingelhöller: 150 Jahre Staatl. Akademie d. Bildenden Künste Karlsruhe, 2004, p. 235,335, ISBN 3-89929-045-3
- Hans Gercke, Ursula Merkel: Holger Walter Ex_Cavations, Karlsruhe 2009
- Chantal Prod'Hom: Le verre vivant, MUDAC, La Bibliothèque des Arts, Lausanne 2013, p. 24, ISBN 978-2-88453-177-1
