= Hölderlin-Gymnasium Lauffen am Neckar =

Coordinates: 49.070472°N 9.139444°E

The Hölderlin-Gymnasium is a general educational Gymnasium in Lauffen am Neckar, Baden-Württemberg, Germany. The school is named after the Romantic poet Friedrich Hölderlin, a native of Lauffen.

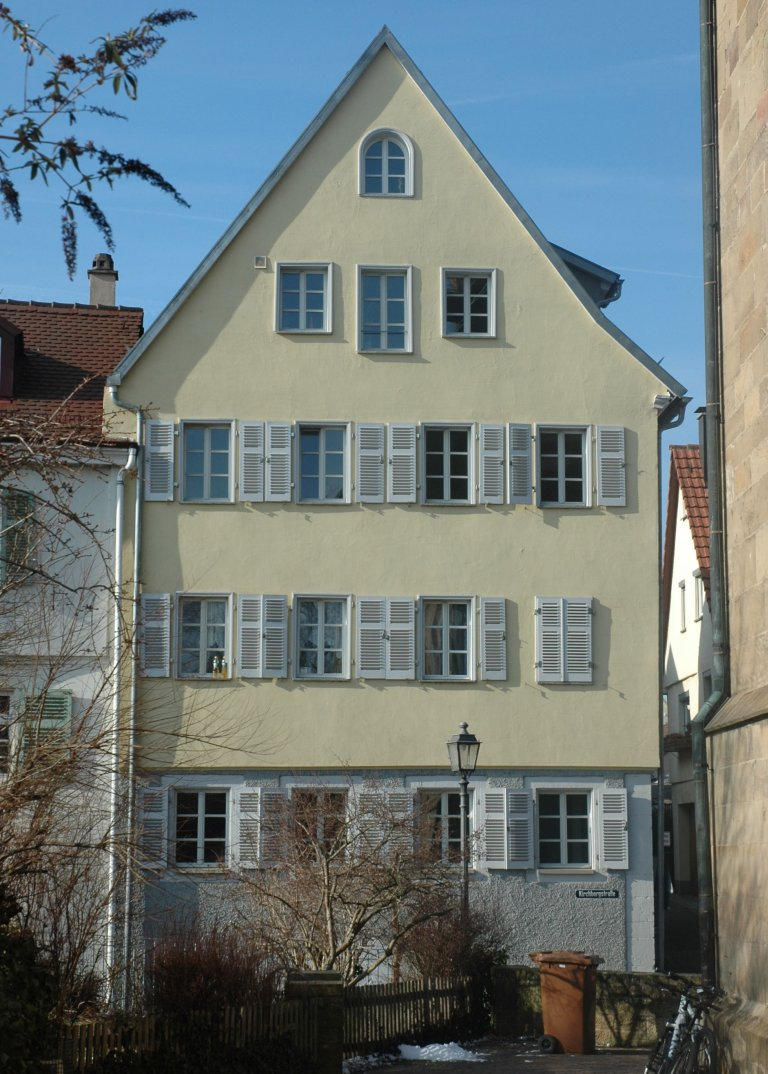
Old building of the former Lateinschule of the Hölderlin-Gymnasium

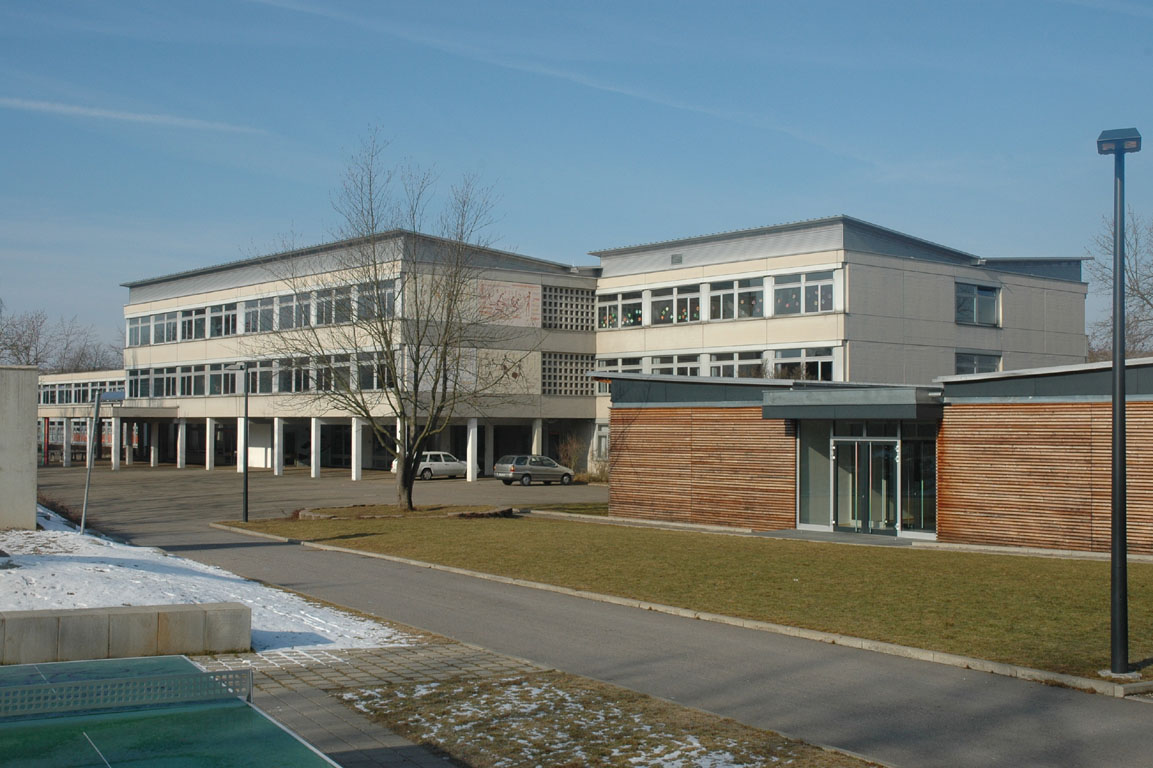
Current building of the Hölderlin-Gymnasium

== History ==
The school can be traced back to 1491, when Eberhard I, Duke of Württemberg, established a Prädikatur. Martin Larin is mentioned in 1506 as the first official schoolmaster; prior to that, the priest had held the office of teacher. When the Reformation reached Württemberg in the mid-16th century, the Prädikatur was merged with the Latin school, established by Ulrich of Württemberg, whose purpose was to educate the children of Württemberg officials and theologians. By 1520 17 students had enrolled at the universities of Heidelberg and Tübingen, some of whom later served as pastors in Lauffen.

From 1835, several Royal Decrees converted single-class Latin schools into secondary schools. In Lauffen, these decrees were implemented after the death of the preceptor Christoph Jakob Klunzinger, who had worked at the school since 1812. The aim of this transformation was "partly to promote the general civic education, partly to make pupils fit for the various civil professions". The transformation, however, met with opposition from some parents, and a group of 49 people expressed their opposition. After a minister was called in, an initial compromise was reached which envisioned the school as a Realschule that would also teach Latin. From 1838 a state grant of 200 gulden was provided to fund the implementation of this compromise proposal, but in subsequent years it was the subject of continuous quarrels. Starting in 1848, the school operated as a Latin school again.

During the First World War the school consisted of two classes; during the Second World War it was designated an Oberschule and had four classes. In 1954 the school became the Hölderlin Progymnasium in the newly built school Hölderlinschule on Hölderlinstraße. The Progymnasium, the new Volksschule, part of the Hölderlinschule, and the Herzog-Ulrich-Volksschule shared staff until the organisational separation of the Herzog-Ulrich-Volksschule in 1962. In 1967 the school was converted into a full Gymnasium, and in 1970 administered its first Abitur examinations. In 1975 the Hölderlin-Gymnasium moved into a new complex in the western part of the city.

== Sources ==
- Otfried Kies: Festschrift 500 Jahre Lateinschule und Hölderlin-Gymnasium Lauffen am Neckar. Zur Feier des 500. Geburtstags am 21. Juni 1991. 2 Auflage. Walter, Brackenheim-Hausen 1991 (mit Beiträgen von Kurt Eißele und Albert Gänßle).
- Grundbeschreibung der Lateinschule Lauffen a. N.. angelegt um 1850, mit Nachträgen bis 1919 (Staatsarchiv Ludwigsburg, Signatur E 202 Bü 190).
- Jürgen Reiner, Ulrich Böhner: Chronologie der Lauffener Schulgeschichte. In: Lauffener Heimatblätter. Heft 23, Heimatverein Gesellschaft Alt-Lauffen, Lauffen a. N. 2008.
