= Ulrich Schiefer =

German sociologist and anthropologist

Ulrich Schiefer (born September 10, 1952, in Lauffen am Neckar) is a German rural and development sociologist and anthropologist. His main interests are development policy and international development cooperation, especially their impact on sub-Saharan Africa.

== Biography ==
Ulrich Schiefer studied sociology with Christian Sigrist and Song Du-yul at the Westfälische Wilhelms-Universität in Münster, Social anthropology with Rüdiger Schott and Ulrich Köhler, Sinology with Ulrich Unger as well as Communication studies. After his Magister degree in sociology (1977) on Agricultural cooperatives in the People's Republic of China, he worked as a United Nations volunteer in urban and regional planning in Guinea-Bissau. On his return, he studied the establishment of colonial commercial and administrative structures and their transformation in the post-colonial period in Guinea-Bissau for his Doctorate (PhD) (1984). In 2000, he obtained his Habilitation (state doctorate) in Münster on "Dissipative Economy: Development Cooperation and the Collapse of African Agrarian Societies". In 2013, he obtained another habilitation in sociology at the ISCTE - University Institute of Lisbon.

== Professional career ==
From 1986, he was the research assistant at the Institute for Sociology at the University of Münster, where he led the field research of the project "Agrarian Societies and Rural Development Policies in Guinea-Bissau" which was directed by Christian Sigrist and funded by the Volkswagen Foundation. This was followed by the establishment of a national research center in Guinea-Bissau. Basic research on the changes of war-traumatised agricultural societies and post-colonial development models as well as applied research for development agencies formed the starting point for new theoretical and methodological approaches to development policy. He advised several international organisations, particularly in the fields of Regional development, planning and evaluation, organisation and network development. He carried out field research in Guinea-Bissau, Mozambique, Cape Verde and Angola and supported the introduction of the planning and evaluation methodology he developed in the successor states of the former Soviet Union as well as in Portugal. The main focus of his academic teaching activities are development and humanitarian interventions and their impact on the disintegration of African societies as well as organisational development. From 2002 to 2013 he was lecturer (Privatdozent) at the Institute for Sociology at the University of Münster and in 2014 guest professor at the University of Graz. Since 1993 he is professor at the ISCTE (-IUL) in Lisbon, focusing on African studies and organisational development. From 2011 to 2016, he was coordinator of a Master's course in African Studies and a Postgraduate Course in Organisational Development in Public Administration at the ISCTE (-IUL). Since 2016 he is director of the doctoral course in African studies.

== Research ==
=== Field research in Africa ===
As the last countries in Africa, the Portuguese colonies reached their independence after a ten-year war of independence, which was only ended by the Carnation Revolution in Portugal in 1974. Development aid together with Military aid, played an important role in the conflict between the rival Great Powers in the Cold War for their spheres of interest in Africa. The inflow of international development aid, especially to Cape Verde and Guinea-Bissau, also opened up opportunities for the social scientific research of these societies by international scientists. The violent decolonisation led to long-lasting Civil wars in Angola and Mozambique and to a Coup d'état in Guinea-Bissau in 1998, followed by a one-year Civil war. Ulrich Schiefer conducted various interdisciplinary research projects, among others, on the potential for development of war traumatised African agrarian societies and the development strategies of post-colonial states in West Africa, especially in Guinea-Bissau. The emergence of colonial trade and administrative structures and their continuity after independence provided the background for the continuity of the colonial counter-insurgency strategy in the development planning of the postcolonial state. He pointed out the failure of externally induced development strategies on African agrarian societies in numerous detailed investigations, among others, on post-harvest protection, on the development of industry and handicraft, on transport, on agrarian cooperatives, on the development cooperation of Portuguese civil society and on the impact of structural adjustment measures on the situation of African families. His fundamental criticism of development cooperation establishes a direct link between the development strategies – including their operational implementation through the project approach – and the collapse of African societies.

=== Theory of dissipative economy ===
The development strategies of the last decades have not led to the desired successes. Instead, numerous states in sub-Saharan Africa are in a continuous process of social disintegration. With his mainly sociological research on development, Schiefer wants to contribute to a theory of social collapse. He asks how far international aid is responsible for the destabilisation and collapse of post-colonial states and societies. On the basis of more than fifteen years of research, he analyses this nexus using the example of Guinea-Bissau. He reconstructs the overall socio-political developments, and examines the effects of development aid specifically on agrarian societies. Given the obvious failures of both theory and practice of development cooperation, based on the terminology and inspired by the work of Ilya Prigogines, Schiefer conceived the concept of "dissipative economy". In the seventies the chemist Ilya Prigogine studied the theory of non-equilibrium dynamics. Almost all the laws of classical physics were concerned with closed systems of equilibrium, which in practice are nearly non-existent. He studied open systems that continually exchange energy or matter with their environment, i.e. are not in thermodynamic equilibrium. In open systems spontaneous structures can form. Their existence depends decisively on the system parameters. Already small variations can destroy the order and the system goes over into a chaotic phase. Prigogine created the term dissipative structure. Since then, many scientists have confirmed that this model is applicable to any open system. In 1977 Prigogine received the Nobel Prize in Chemistry for his contribution to the theory of equilibrium irreversible dissipative structures. Schiefer's dissipative economy translates this approach to development cooperation and humanitarian aid. It thus provides an explanatory approach for the emergence and continuation of almost similar organisational landscapes in many, often very different, so-called developing countries. The development agencies, from the large international and national organisations to the small non-governmental organisations, thus appear as dissipative structures. They function only through the provision of a regular inflow of development aid. The funding of the internal players is guaranteed by an external inflow of money by the external agencies. These ensure their outflow through project funding and the like. These funds flow into a national economy mostly concentrated in the cities. There, they are then largely used in an unproductive manner. This whole sector of the economy which is dependent on a continuous external input Schiefer defines as dissipative economy.

=== Work on unsolved problems in Africa ===
Meticulous studies show the destructive and often irreversible effects of the international development policy, mainly based on technology transfer, on agrarian societies. The consequences are: decline in productivity, food crises, rapid urbanisation, political instability, forced migrations and violent conflicts which provide the background for post-colonial state failures and social disintegration in sub-Saharan Africa. This approach contributes to the theory about the collapse of societies. It describes the interactions between the development agencies and the respective national elites and their connection to the internal dynamics of African societies. Together with Marina Padrão Temudo, he introduced the concept of resilience into the debate on the disintegration and destruction of African agrarian societies. They investigated their resilience in times of crisis, in particular their ability to accommodate war refugees over extended periods of time. In this way, they showed an alternative to the establishment of refugee camps, which are often incubators of further violence and social destruction. Since 2008, he and Ana Larcher Carvalho have been conducting research on the link between development policy, migration and Food security. In 2015 he began to research about the communication in and with African agrarian societies. Since 2017 they initiated international research on the nonadaptation of technology in African societies - Natas Project.

=== Integrated planning and evaluation of projects (MAPA) ===
Schiefer developed an integrated planning and evaluation system for development and social intervention projects, "MAPA" (Method for Applied Planning and Assessment). MAPA handbooks have been published in four languages and are used in many countries. This system, based on a participatory approach, allows for the operational integration of evaluation and planning and provides an alternative to the Project cycle management criticised by Schiefer.

== Publications ==
- Integrated Evaluation of Change. A new perspective for planning and evaluation in multiple intervention environments. Periploi, Lisboa 2008, ISBN 978-989-8079-06-0.
- with others: Facilitação – Gestão de Processos Participativos. Principia, Cascais 2006, ISBN 972-8818-65-3.
- with others: MAPA – Manual de Planeamento e Avaliação de Projectos. Principia, Cascais 2006, ISBN 972-8818-58-0.
- Von allen guten Geistern verlassen? Guinea Bissau: Entwicklungspolitik und der Zusammenbruch afrikanischer Gesellschaften. IAK, Hamburg 2002, ISBN 3-928049-83-6.
- with Reinald Döbel: ПРОЕКТ МППА, Практическое руководство по Комплексному Проекту Планирования и Оценки, Авторы: Ульрих Шифер, Раиналд Дёбель, При содействии Лючинии Бал, еревод Татьяны Терещенко.2002.
- with Reinald Döbel: Projekti MAPA Udhezues praktik per planifikimin dhe vleresimin e integruar te projektit. KES/FKSHC, Prishtine 2001, ISBN 963-7316-97-3.
- with Reinald Döbel: MAPA – Project. A Practical Guide to Integrated Project Planning and Evaluation. OSI-IEP Publications, Budapest 2001, ISBN 963-7316-96-5.
- with others: A Cooperação da Sociedade Civil Portuguesa na Área da Solidariedade Social, CEA-ISCTE + Ministério de Solidariedade e Segurança Social (2 vols.). Lisboa, 179 + 218 p.
- with Olavo Borges de Oliveira und Philip J. Havik: Armazenamento tradicional na Guiné-Bissau. Produtos, sementes e celeiros utilizados pelas etnias na Guiné-Bissau: Fascículo 1, Beafada; Fascículo 2, Mandinga; Fascículo 3, Nalú; Fascículo 4, Balante; Fascículo 5, Fula de Quebo. Bissau – Lisboa – IFS, Münster 1996. [Food Security and Compound Storage in Guinea-Bissau]. ISSN 0939-284X
- Guiné-Bissau zwischen Weltwirtschaft und Subsistenz – Transatlantisch orientierte Strukturen an der oberen Guinéküste. ISSA, Bonn 1986, ISBN 3-921614-56-2
