= Uwe Wagschal =

German political scientist (born 1966)

- Born: 28 March 1966 (age 60); Lauffen am Neckar, Baden-Württemberg, Germany
- Occupation: Political scientist

Uwe Wagschal (born 28 March 1966 in Lauffen am Neckar, Baden-Württemberg) is a German political scientist.

== Education ==
Wagschal studied political science and economics at Heidelberg University. Magister Artium in political science and economics in 1992. Earned a diploma in economics in 1993, and graduated with a Ph.D. in political science from Heidelberg University (1996) based on a dissertation dealing with public debt in comparative perspective.

== Career ==
Lecturer and research associate at Heidelberg University (1994–1997); assistant professor of political science at Heidelberg University and the University of Bremen (1997–2001); visiting fellowships at the University of Amsterdam, the University of Hull (UK), and the University of Essex in Colchester (UK). Senior political scientist and senior economist for the think tank Avenir Suisse (2001–2003); lecturer at the University of Zurich (summer term 2002). From 2002 to 2003, he was professor of empirical political science and policy analysis at LMU Munich. Since the winter term 2005/06, he was professor of comparative politics at Heidelberg University. Since 2006, he was chairman of the Department of Political Science at Heidelberg University. Since 2009, he holds the chair of comparative political science at the University of Freiburg.

== Books/edited volumes (selection) ==
- Haushaltskonsolidierung (with Georg Wenzelburger), Wiesbaden: VS-Verlag, 2008.
- Steuerpolitik und Steuerreformen im internationalen Vergleich. Eine Analyse der Determinanten, Ursachen und Blockaden, Münster: Lit, 2005.
- Statistik für Politikwissenschaftler, München und Wien: Oldenbourg, 1999.
- Direkte Demokratie – Bestandsaufnahmen und Wirkungen im internationalen Vergleich (with Markus Freitag), Münster: Lit, 2007.
- Politische Ökonomie, Demokratie und wirtschaftliche Leistungsfähigkeit (with Herbert Obinger and Bernhard Kittel), VS-Verlag 2006.

== Articles/book chapters ==
- A Mortgage on the Future? Public Debt Expenditure and Its Determinants, 1980-2001, in: Castles, Frank (ed.): The Disappearing State? Cheltenham, 2007, pp. 215–244
- Länder unter Anpassungsdruck? Der Internationaler Steuerwettbewerb: Ursachen, Wirkungen und Reaktionen, in: Gesellschaft, Wirtschaft und Politik, Heft 4, 2006, pp. 499–514
- Handlungsoptionen des Nationalstaats im internationalen Steuerwettbewerb, in: Staats- und Europawissenschaften, Heft 1, 2006, pp. 142–165.
- Die Schulen der Internationalen Politischen Ökonomie, in: Gesellschaft, Wirtschaft und Politik, Heft 2, 2005, pp. 165–176 (with Jan Mergler and Michael Blauberger)
- Die modifizierte Senatslösung. Ein Vorschlag zur Beseitigung von Reformblockaden im deutschen Föderalismus, in: Zeitschrift für Parlamentsfragen, Heft 4, 2004, pp. 126–146 (with Max Grasl).
- Verfassungsbarrieren als Grenzen der Staatstätigkeit, in: Schweizer Zeitschrift für Politische Wissenschaft, Heft 2, 2002, S. 51-87.
- Der Parteienstaat in Deutschland und die parteipolitische Zusammensetzung seiner Schlüsselinstitutionen, in: Zeitschrift für Parlamentsfragen, Heft 4, 2001, pp. 861–886.
- Zwei Nachbarn - Ein Weg? Politisch-institutionelle Bedingungen der Steuerpolitik in Deutschland und Österreich, in: Österreichische Zeitschrift für Politikwissenschaft, Heft 3, 2001, pp. 291–311.
- Parteien, Wahlen und die Unabhängigkeit der Bundesbank, in: Zeitschrift für Politikwissenschaft, Heft 2, 2001, pp. 573–600.
- Families of Nations and Public Policy, in: West European Politics, Heft 1, pp. 99–114, 2001 (with Herbert Obinger).
- Direktdemokratie und Sozialpolitik, in: Politische Vierteljahresschrift, 41 Jg., Heft 3, 2000, pp. 466–497 (with Herbert Obinger).
- Monetary Institutions in Germany: Maintaining Independence in Times of Fiscal Stress, in: Ludger Helms (ed.): Institutions and Institutional Change in the Federal Republic of Germany, London: Macmillan, pp. 143– 165, 2000.
- Das Ausgabenparadoxon der athenischen Direktdemokratie, in: Der Staat, 39 Jg., Heft 2, 2000, pp. 256–274.
- Blockieren Vetospieler Steuerreformen?, in: Politische Vierteljahresschrift, 40 Jg., Heft 4, 1999, pp. 628–640.
- Parties, Party Systems and Policy Effects, in: Pennings, Paul und Lane, Jan- Erik (eds.): Comparing Party System Change, London: Routledge, 1998, pp. 62–78.
- Politische und Institutionelle Determinanten der Staatsverschuldung, in: Zeitschrift für Wirtschaftspolitik, 47 Jg., Heft 2, 1998, pp. 220–243.
- Direct Democracy and Public Policymaking, in: Journal of Public Policy, 17 Jg., Heft 2, 1997, pp. 223–245.
- Der Einfluß von Parteien und Wahlen auf die Staatsverschuldung, in: Schweizerische Zeitschrift für Politische Wissenschaft, 2 Jg., Heft 4, 1996, pp. 305–328.
