= Arnold Schiefer =

Austrian politician (born 1966)

Member of the National Council
- Incumbent
- Assumed office 24 October 2024

Personal details
- Born: 22 December 1966 (age 59)
- Party: Freedom Party

Arnold Schiefer (born 22 December 1966) is an Austrian railway manager and politician of the Freedom Party. He was elected member of the National Council in the 2024 legislative election, and served as chief financial officer of Austrian Federal Railways from 2019 to 2023.
