= Andrea Lindlohr =

German politician (born 1975)

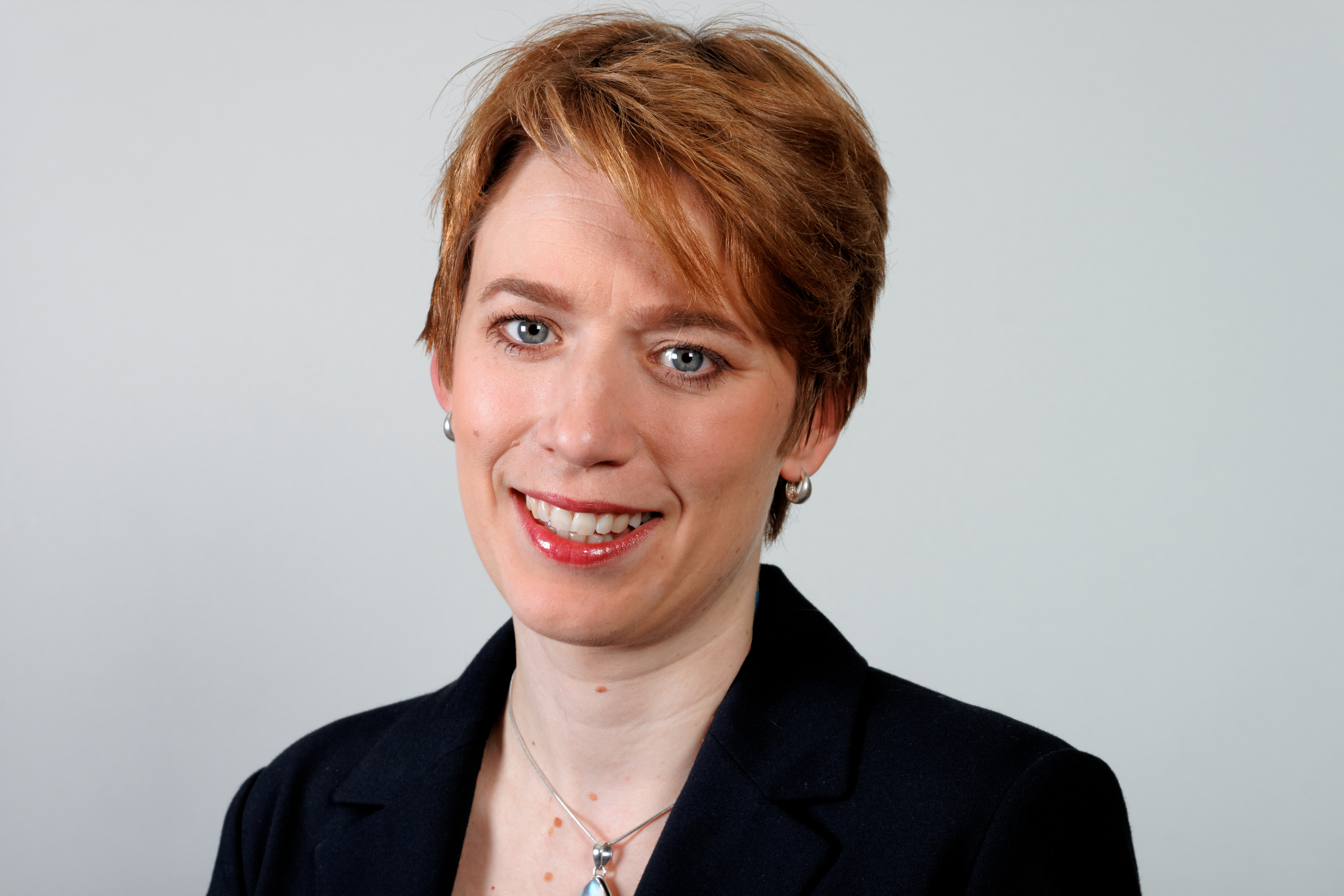
- Lindlohr in 2013

Member of the Landtag of Baden-Württemberg
- Incumbent
- Assumed office 12 April 2011
- Constituency: Esslingen (2016–present)

Personal details
- Born: 19 February 1975 (age 51) Königswinter
- Party: Alliance 90/The Greens (since 1998)

Andrea Lindlohr (born 19 February 1975 in Königswinter) is a German politician serving as a member of the Landtag of Baden-Württemberg since 2011. She has served as state secretary of regional development and housing since 2021.

In the negotiations to form a coalition government under the leadership of Cem Özdemir following the 2026 state elections in Baden-Württemberg, Lindlohr co-chaired the working group on economic affairs, alongside Winfried Mack.
