= Winfried Mack =

German politician (born 1965)

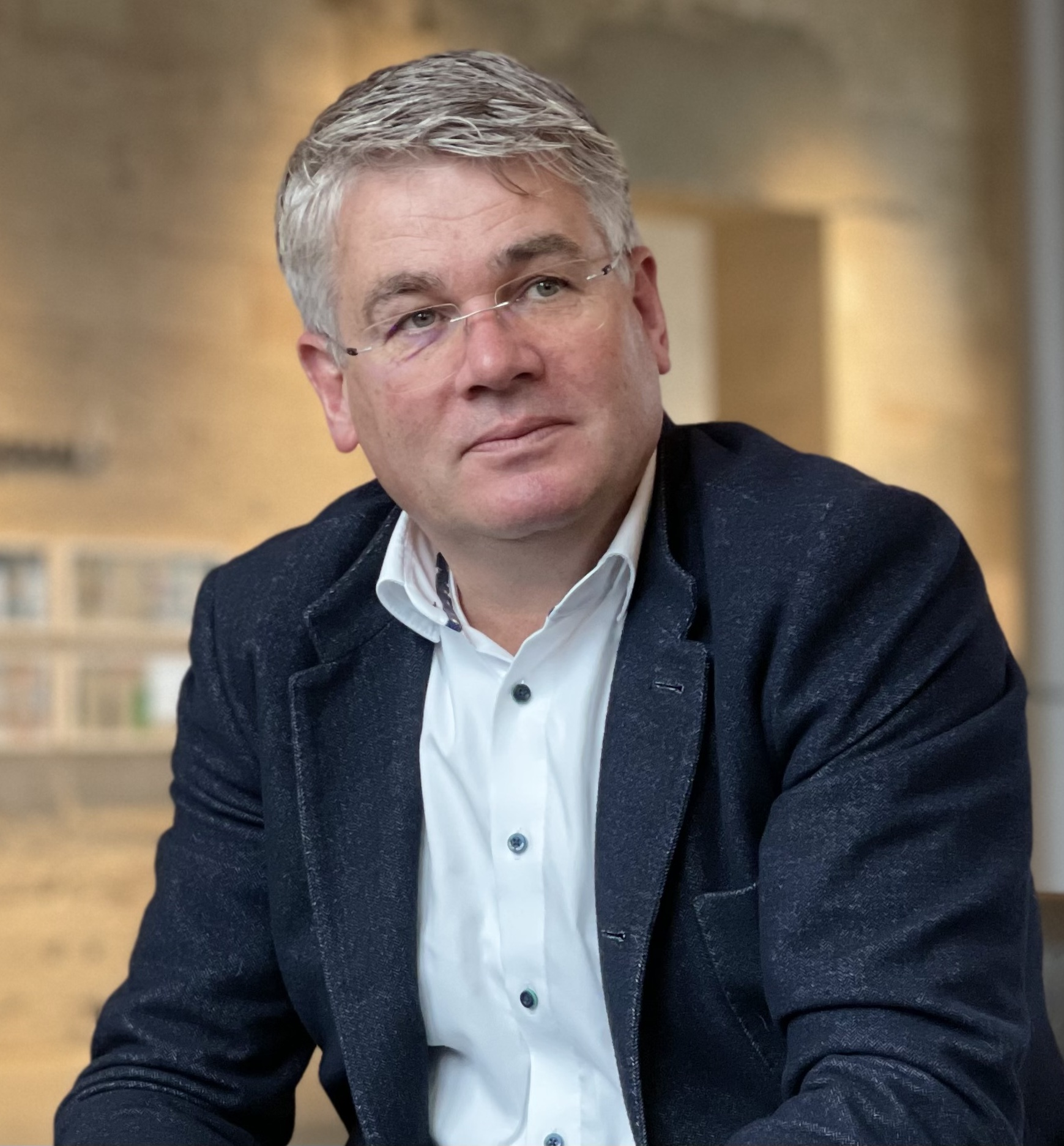
- Mack in 2021

Member of the Landtag of Baden-Württemberg
- Incumbent
- Assumed office 10 April 2001
- Constituency: Aalen

Personal details
- Born: 6 August 1965 (age 60) Ellwangen
- Party: Christian Democratic Union

Winfried Erlolf Mack (born 6 August 1965 in Ellwangen) is a German politician serving as a member of the Landtag of Baden-Württemberg since 2001. He has served as deputy group leader of the Christian Democratic Union since 2011.

In the negotiations to form a coalition government under the leadership of Cem Özdemir following the 2026 state elections in Baden-Württemberg, Mack co-chaired the working group on economic affairs, alongside Andrea Lindlohr.
