= Ulrich W. Schiefer =

German engineer

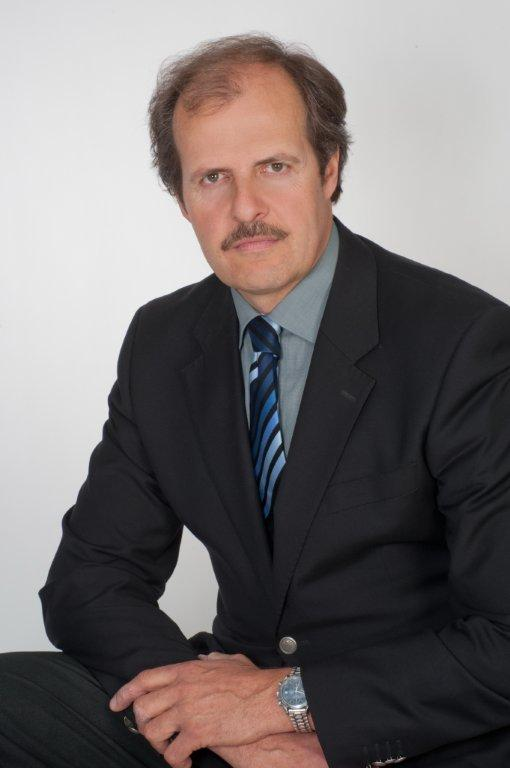
Ulrich W. Schiefer

Ulrich W. Schiefer (born 5 November 1958 in Stuttgart, Germany) is a German graduated engineer and Master of Business Administration. He is managing director of the AtTrack GmbH – Gesellschaft für Mobilität. He is an expert in setting up and managing companies, technology, innovation, product management, complete vehicle integration, composites, aerodynamics and engine development.

== Education ==
After having taken his A level at the mathematic-scientific Gymnasium in the town of Winnenden in 1978, Schiefer started his studies of aerospace engineering at the University of Stuttgart. In 1982, he performed his seminar work at the Daimler Benz AG about design and built of an engine block made of carbon composite material. In 1984, he concluded his studies as “Diplom-Ingenieur” (German university degree comparable to the Master of Engineering) with his diploma thesis project in which he compared aerodynamic simulation (CFD) to experimental results from the wind tunnel. In 1993, he did his extra occupational doctorate (Doctor of Engineering) at the FKFS (Research Institute for Automotive and Engines) at the University of Stuttgart. The experimental work dealt with the aerodynamics of the vehicle wheel. In 2000, he finished his MBA with the double degree at the Northwestern University of Chicago and the WHU at Vallendar. He wrote his thesis about the topic of motorsports marketing.

== Career ==
Schiefer began his career in 1985 at the BMW AG as an aerodynamics engineer for the Formula 1 racing cars Brabham, Arrows and Benetton. His area of responsibility was gradually extended from vehicle body and chassis to the responsibility for the complete vehicle. Thereafter he worked on the development and the optimization of combustion engines (i. a. gas exchange, combustion, friction, ...). During his occupation at BMW, Schiefer carried out various executive positions, as for instance head of the race car development and the race programs in more than 20 countries for the BMW Motorsport GmbH, Garching near Munich. Under his direction, more than 100 race touring cars were built and some 20 national championships were won. As director of the overall vehicle development and bodywork at the BMW Technik GmbH Munich he was responsible for the development of a carbon fiber body ready for serial production. Schiefer was responsible for the setup and direction of the innovation center of the BMW AG, which dealt with the development of new vehicle platforms and the identification and implementation of new technologies. In parallel he was overall project manager of the BMW racing program at the 24 Hours of Le Mans 1999.

Schiefer was member of the committees of the “Federation International de l’Automobile” (FIA): From 1993 to 1997 on behalf of BMW in the Manufacturers Commission of the FIA and from 2000 to 2002 on behalf of Aston Martin in the Homologation Commission of the FIA.

At the beginning of 2000, Schiefer switched to Ford and became director responsible of vehicle development and motor racing at Aston Martin in Gaydon, England. Next to the built-up of a new development site with a new team, a new vehicle platform and the respective kit of components was developed. Thereof three road sports cars were derived and turned to series-production readiness. Furthermore, he set up Aston Martin's factory race team.

In 2001, Schiefer founded the Porsche Engineering Group Holding, under whose umbrella all development activities of Porsche for internal and external customers were concentrated. He thereupon was both managing director of the PEG and the biggest subsidiary of PEG “Porsche Engineering Services GmbH” based in Bietigheim. Moreover, he was Chairman of the Supervisory Board of the Porsche Engineering Services based in Detroit (with a design studio in California) and was member of the advisory board of the Porsche Consulting GmbH, Zuffenhausen.

In 2004, Schiefer founded the AtTrack GmbH – Gesellschaft für Mobilität whose activities cover automotive technology and design as well as consulting of enterprises. Since 2004, he involved his industry experience over periods of years into medium-sized companies as interim managing director. With his team, he works on vehicle projects and advises companies on the development of new vehicles, drives and the according technologies. For instance, he supported the automotive brand Alpina reentering motor sport with his and his team's engineering capabilities and was instrumental for the homologation of the vehicle at the Federation International de l’Automobile (FIA).

As AtTrack was soon aware of the problematic dynamics of competition between fuel and food supply, one forwarded the development of a biofuel addition technique. The aim was to apply bioethanol as an additive. In order to be more economical with this precious natural product, one must inject it demand-orientatedly (like f. ex. with accelerating enhancement). To show the technology to the public, the AtTrack Bioendurance Team 2006 under the direction of Schiefer deployed a Subaru WRX STI with Johnny Cecotto and Diego Romanini as drivers at the 24 Hours Nürburgring. It was the first race car performing at the Nürburgring, which was fueled with bioethanol. With the so-called AtGreen Concept, Schiefer and his team showed that fuel made of renewable resources and racing performance do not contradict one another.

Since 2004 Schiefer is undertaking the development of an innovative road vehicle, the AtTrack TG 700, which is a world first in terms of vehicle topology. Being one of the lightest vehicles in his homologation class, it is leader in bearing maximum payload. The vehicle was consigned road legality in 2011. Small scale production is in preparation and the car will be available for sale in the second half of 2012.

Since early 2012, Schiefer is known to support Karlsruhe Institute of Technology's Student Race Team Ka-RaceIng with his racing expertise and carries on his personal longstanding passion to "train the auto engineers of the future".

In Praxi, the alumni association of his alma mater in economics at the Wissenschaftliche Hochschule für Unternehmensführung in Vallendar (WHU), nominated him to be board member responsible for communities and regional chapters.

In November 2011 he launched the symposium „Auto der Zukunft“ in Stuttgart, which he guides in terms of content since then. The event addresses all aspects of the whole vehicle, which is a new format compared to typically specialized automotive symposiums.

Schiefer has mandates for interim management and is member of several supervisory boards.

== Research and Teaching ==
For example:

- Entwicklungs- und Innovationsmanagement, f. ex. in cooperation with the Steinbeis Transfer Zentrum für Technologie und Innovation, Stuttgart
- Produktmanagement für Designer, f. ex. at the Hochschule der bildenden Künste, Stuttgart
- Fahrzeugaerodynamik, in cooperation with the Bundeswehrhochschule, Munich

Moreover:

- Supervision of seminar papers, diploma and doctoral theses
- Lectures
- Job information events (at grammar school)
- Member of the Code of Conduct Team, WHU Koblenz
- Mentor at the mentor program, WHU Koblenz
- Cooperation in the selection panel of the EMBA program, Kellogg/WHU

== Publications and Speeches ==
=== Books ===
- Ulrich W. Schiefer: Zur Simulationstechnik des freistehenden Fahrzeugrades im Windkanal Institut für Verbrennungsmotoren und Kraftfahrwesen der Universität Stuttgart, 1993, ISBN 3-924860-16-5.

=== Journals ===
- Jochen Übler: "Vier Supersportwagen im Vergleich, Kohle-Kraftwerke"
- Ulrich W. Schiefer: "Tendencies in the Automobile Markets", F&E with methodology competence
- Ulrich W. Schiefer: "Mobilitätsbranche unter Strom"
- Moderation Heike Mensink, Bernhard D. Valnion: "Wird Karthago fallen? Mobilität aus der Steckdose",
- Ulrich W. Schiefer: „Der Preis ist heiss ...“
- Ulrich W. Schiefer: „Lemminge oder Zugvögel? - Chancen und Risiken der Car-to-X-Communication“
- Ulrich W. Schiefer: „Die gemeinsame Sache bringt den Erfolg“

Schiefer regularly contributes to public and private forums and media.

=== Speeches ===
- 4. Internationales Automobil-Forum Graz. Meeting for automobile manufacturers and suppliers. 30.9.-2.10.2002.

Topic: "Automobil-Engineering as service"
- Suppliers' early accession to the OEM via the engineering service provider
- The customer developers of the new daughter company Porsche Engineering Group (PEG)

- "Alles eine Frage des Blickwinkels?" (It's all a matter of perspective?) Topics: Values, knowledge, change, electric mobility. Speech held during the New Year perception of the Wirtschaftsjunioren Worms on January, 10th 2011. Published in: WJ INFO - Wirtschaftsjunioren der Metropolregion Rhein-Neckar.
- 20. Juni 2012 "Aerodynamics", KIT (Karlsruhe Institute of Technology), in a series of lectures on race car technics.

== Voluntary work ==
Among other activities, Schiefer is voluntarily committed in the Work Group of Evangelic Entrepreneurs in Germany (AEU) with regards to economic ethics. The communication between church and economy is being supported among others by organising various events like the Prälaturgespräch Stuttgart. With his expertise Schiefer contributes to different voluntary organisations (f. ex. the EJW Churchnight). He also cooperates with the institution for qualification of the foundation for blind and partially blind people called Nikolausflege. Schiefer helped setting up Zeppelin Toursitik Europe and is still member in the Förderverein Zeppelin Touristik (Association Zeppelin Touristik).

== Quotes ==
- "We plan to develop synergies involving knowledge, proficiency and capacity." In: Christophorus. The Porsche Magazine. No. 292, Oct/Nov 2001, p. 32–33.
