= Schiffner =

Schiffner is a German surname. Notable people with the surname include:

- Christina Schiffner (born 1949), East German sprinter
- Ria Schiffner (born 1996), German ice dancer
- Sepp Schiffner (born 1930), Austrian Nordic skier
- Victor Félix Schiffner (1862-1944), Austrian botanist
