= June 1959 =

Month of 1959

| << | June 1959 | | | | | >> |
| Su | Mo | Tu | We | Th | Fr | Sa |
| | 1 | 2 | 3 | 4 | 5 | 6 |
| 7 | 8 | 9 | 10 | 11 | 12 | 13 |
| 14 | 15 | 16 | 17 | 18 | 19 | 20 |
| 21 | 22 | 23 | 24 | 25 | 26 | 27 |
| 28 | 29 | 30 |

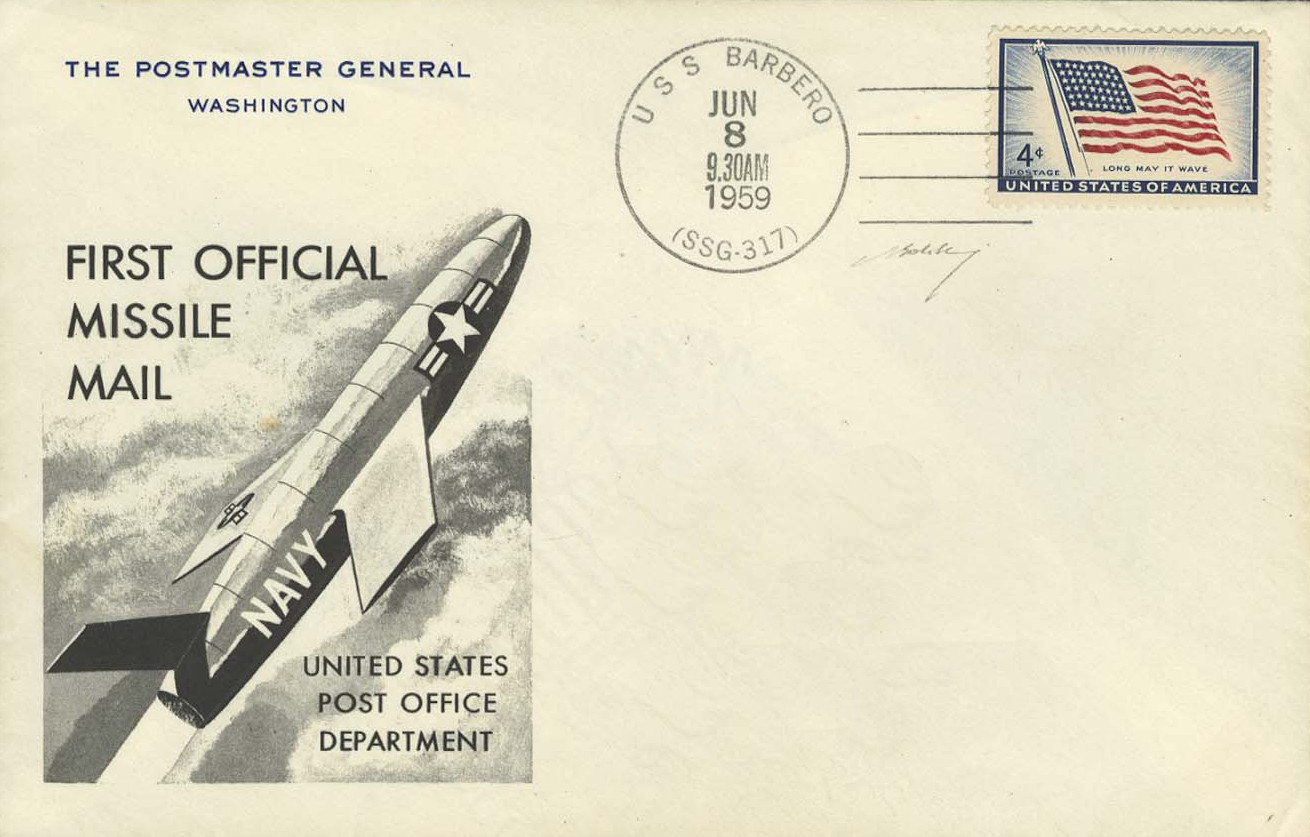
June 8, 1959: 3,000 letters sent by U.S. missile

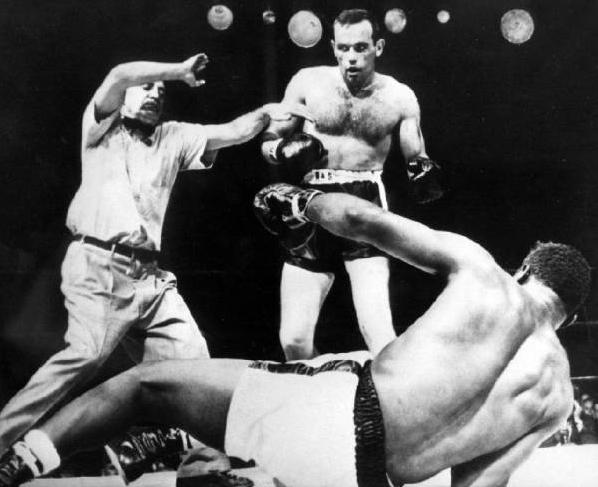
June 26, 1959: Johannson of Sweden KO's heavyweight champion Patterson

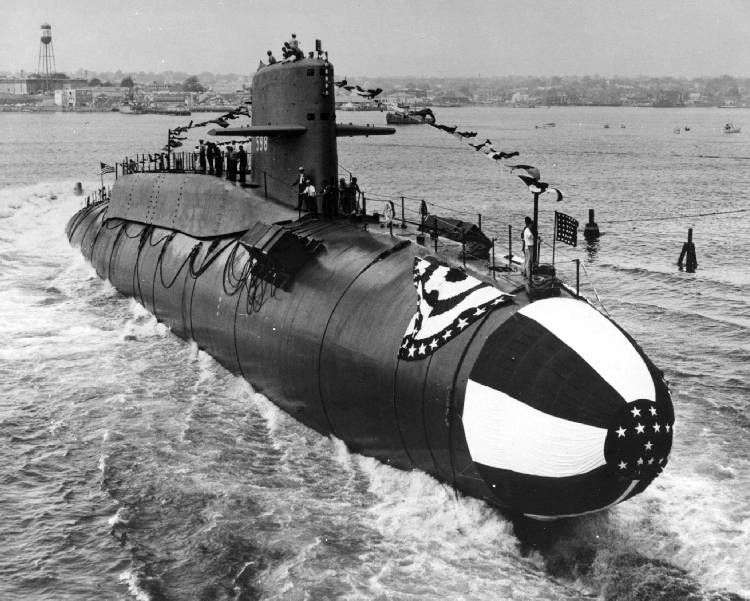
June 9, 1959: USS George Washington, first ballistic missile sub, is launched

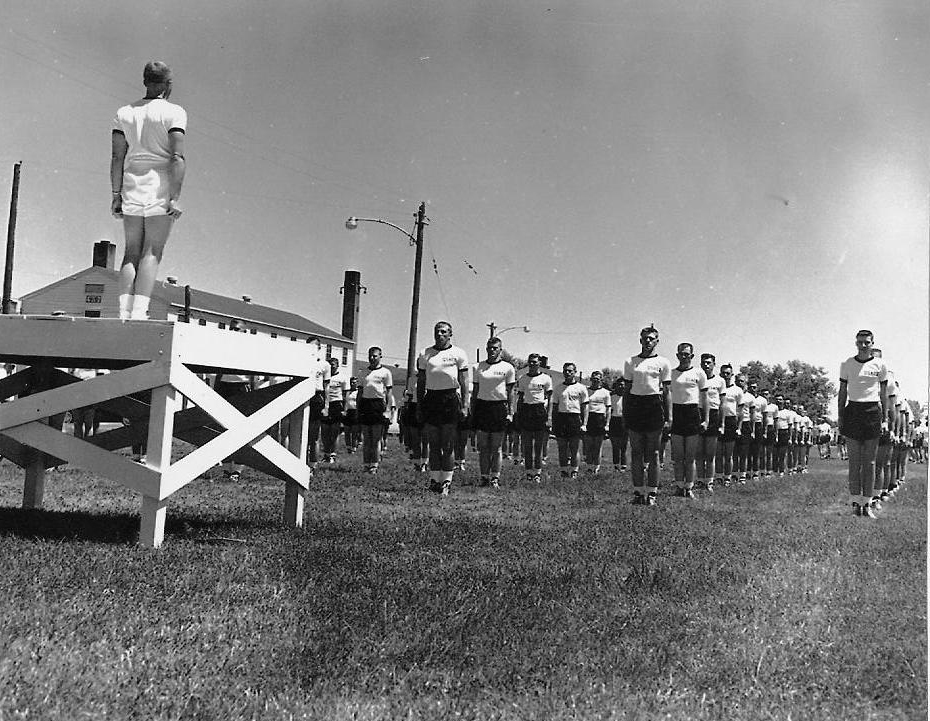
June 3, 1959: The original Air Force Academy class graduates

The following events occurred in June 1959:

== June 1, 1959 (Monday) ==
- Four days after her flight into space, Miss Able, a rhesus monkey, died of a reaction to anesthesia during surgery to remove electrodes.
- Two small groups of Nicaraguan exiles invaded from Costa Rica, landing airplanes at two locations, in an attempt to overthrow President Luis Somoza. The invasion, which Somoza believed to have been instigated by Cuba's Fidel Castro, was crushed on June 11.
- The number of people in Project Mercury was announced as 383 by NASA, with 204 at the Space Task Group, 98 at Langley Research Center, 44 at Lewis Research Center, and 21 on the Mercury tracking network.
- Died: Sax Rohmer (pen name for Arthur Henry Ward), 76, British novelist and the creator of Fu Manchu, died from complications of Asiatic flu.

== June 2, 1959 (Tuesday) ==
- Beatrice Foods purchased the independent Dannon Milk Products Company of Long Island City, New York from founders Joe Metzger and Dan Carazzo. Over the next decade, Beatrice developed America's taste for yogurt by introducing the Dannon Yogurt brand across the United States.
- Twelve people were killed and 15 injured in Schuylkill Haven, Pennsylvania, in the explosion of a propane truck. The truck had caught fire 30 minutes earlier after being rammed from behind, and many of the victims had been watching from a distance.

== June 3, 1959 (Wednesday) ==
- The army of Ecuador brutally suppressed rioting in Guayaquil, killing more than 500 people.
- The United States Air Force Academy graduated its first class, with 207 students commissioned as officers.
- The United States attempted to launch four mice into orbit aboard the satellite Discoverer III, but the mission failed when the rockets fired the vehicle downward rather than horizontally; the satellite burned up on re-entry.

== June 4, 1959 (Thursday) ==
- At a staff meeting, Space Task Group Director Robert R. Gilruth suggested studying a Mercury follow-on program using maneuverable Mercury capsules for land landings in predetermined areas.
- The 190th and final Three Stooges film short, Sappy Bull Fighters, was released to theaters nationwide.

== June 5, 1959 (Friday) ==
- Singapore was made a self-governing state within the British Empire, with Lee Kuan Yew as Prime Minister, and Sir William Goode serving as Governor-General for the first six months. Singapore achieved full independence in 1965.
- Nikolay Artamonov, commander of a Soviet Navy destroyer, defected to the United States, with his fiancée Eva, after escaping in a motorboat to Öland Island in Sweden. As Nicholas Shadrin, Artamonov, worked for the U.S. Defense Intelligence Agency until the Soviets recaptured him in 1975.
- The Army Ballistic Missile Agency submitted a proposal for a Mercury-Redstone inflight abort sensing system to monitor attitude and angular velocity, electrical power, and rocket propulsion. If the limits were exceeded, the space capsule spacecraft would separate from the rocket and descend with the aid of a parachute.

== June 6, 1959 (Saturday) ==
- The first satellite communication was made when a radio message from U.S. President Dwight D. Eisenhower was bounced off the Moon to Canadian Prime Minister John Diefenbaker, who was dedicating the new Prince Albert Radio Laboratory (PARL).
- Born: Marwan Barghouti, Jordanian-born Palestinian leader instrumental in launching the 1988 intifada; in Kobar on the West Bank

== June 7, 1959 (Sunday) ==
- The United Nations Convention on the Recognition and Enforcement of Foreign Arbitral Awards, also known as the New York Convention, entered into force, under terms adopted by the U.N. on June 10, 1958. The agreement encourages international arbitration of disputes, in that all nations that have accepted the 1959 agreement recognize the results of the arbitration as legally binding. The USSR ratified the treaty in 1960, the US in 1970 and Britain in 1975.
- A.C. Milan won the championship of Italy's top professional soccer football league, finishing in first place on the last day of competition for Serie A with 20 wins, 12 draws and 2 losses (20-12-2) for 52 points, ahead of two other teams with 20 wins, ACF Fiorentina (20-9-5) for 49 points and Inter Milan (20-7-8) for 47 points. Antonio Angelillo was the top scorer with 33 goals
- Charly Gaul of Luxembourg won the Giro d’Italia bicycle race.
- Born: Mike Pence, Vice President of the United States from 2017 to 2021; in Columbus, Indiana

== June 8, 1959 (Monday) ==
- An experiment with "missile mail" proved successful, if not practical. At 10:10 am, the USS Barbero launched a Regulus I rocket, containing 3,000 letters, from a point 100 miles (160 km) offshore from Norfolk, Virginia. The "wheeled missile" was guided to the naval air station at Mayport, Florida, a parachute deployed, and it landed 22 minutes after firing. Postmaster General Arthur E. Summerfield predicted that deliveries of mail by missile would become a regular practice.
- The North American X-15 rocket-powered aircraft made its first flight.
- In Marigliano a protest by the farmers of the province of Naples degenerated into a riot: the city Hall was devastated; a tax and mail office and the carabineers' station were set on fire.
- The Big Joe spacecraft for the Project Mercury reentry test was delivered to Cape Canaveral.
- The Space Task Group (STG) announced the creation of survival items for crewed missions that McDonnell would package in containers, including a PK-2 raft, a distress signal, a dye marker, signal mirrors and whistles, a first aid kits, shark repellent, survival rations, matches, and a radio transceiver, and asked the U.S. Navy assistance to help procurement the items. STG and the School of Aviation Medicine met the same day to discuss details for bio-packs for NASA's Little Joe flight program. The packs, furnished by the school, would gather life support data to be applied to Project Mercury's crewed flights.
- In a Project Horizon report, Wernher von Braun, then with the Army Ballistic Missile Agency, advanced a theory that he had conceived years earlier for using a booster's spent stage as a space station's basic structure. This would later evolve into the "wet stage" concept for the Skylab Program.
- Died: Pietro Canonica, 90, Italian sculptor and senator for life

== June 9, 1959 (Tuesday) ==
- American spy planes intercepted telemetry from a Soviet missile in flight for the first time. Flying near the Iran-USSR border, a U-2 aircraft and an RB-57 Canberra picked up 80 seconds of transmissions from the ICBM to the Tyuratam ground station.
- The West African Customs Union, forerunner of the West African Economic Community, was established by treaty between Dahomey (now Benin), the Ivory Coast (Côte d'Ivoire), Mali, Mauritania, Niger, Senegal and Upper Volta (now Burkina Faso), with headquarters in Ouagadougou, Upper Volta.
- The first ballistic missile submarine, USS George Washington, was launched at 12:40 pm from Groton, Connecticut. On June 28, 1960, the sub was fitted with two Polaris nuclear missiles.
- In Italy, the broadcast of a TV movie, I figli di Medea (The Sons of Medea), caused a mass hysteria, similar to the 1938 panic caused by Orson Welles’s The War of the Worlds. Vladimiro Cajoli's script was in the form of a fictitious news program that started with a bulletin that a sick child of an actress was being held hostage by his father, portrayed by actor Enrico Maria Salerno. The mother, "Medea", was portrayed by well-known actress Alida Valli, whose plea to viewers was so realistic that thousands of people thought that the celebrity was the victim of a crime. One of the viewers came with a gun, into the RAI broadcast studios, preparing to shoot actor Salerno. To make matters worse, the fictional news program gave out a phone number that belonged to a major hospital, whose switchboard was jammed by callers offering tips for finding the "missing child".
- Born: Miles O'Brien, CNN aviation reporter; in Detroit
- Died: Adolf Otto Reinhold Windaus, 82, winner of the 1928 Nobel Prize in Chemistry

== June 10, 1959 (Wednesday) ==
- A month after withdrawing a six-month ultimatum for the Western powers to withdraw from Berlin, Soviet Premier Nikita Khrushchev issued a new deadline when talks broke down in Geneva. Khrushchev demanded that the U.S., Britain, and France withdraw their armies from West Berlin by June 10, 1960. The ultimatum was withdrawn on September 27 when Khrushchev met with President Eisenhower at Camp David.
- Harold Geneen became President of International Telephone & Telegraph (ITT). Over a 28 years, Geneen built the company into a gigantic conglomerate, increasing revenues from $765 million in 1959 to $22 billion by his retirement on January 1, 1978.
- Rocky Colavito of the Cleveland Indians hit four home runs in four consecutive appearances at bat for an 11–8 win over the Baltimore Orioles.
- Born:
  - Carlo Ancelotti, Italian footballer and trainer; in Reggiolo
  - Eliot Spitzer, Governor of New York for 14 months (2007 to 2008) before resigning in the wake of a scandal; in the Bronx

== June 11, 1959 (Thursday) ==
- Turkey's President Celâl Bayar became the first leader of the Islamic nation to be received as a guest by a Roman Catholic Church, as Pope John XXIII welcomed Bayar to the Vatican. The two men had met during World War II when the future pontiff, Bishop Angelo Roncalli, had been the Vatican's apostolic delegate to Istanbul.
- The first large hovercraft, the Saunders-Roe Nautical One SR-N1, made its maiden voyage on the English Channel."On This Day: 11 June: 1959: Hovercraft marks new era in transport", BBC.co.uk
- Lady Chatterley's Lover, by D.H. Lawrence, was barred from distribution in the United States by order of the Postmaster General. Grove Press had announced, in April, publication of the "unexpurgated edition" of Lawrence's novel, and the Postmaster barred it under section 1461 of Title 18 of the United States Code as "obscene and un-mailable".
- Born: Hugh Laurie, British actor and comedian; in Oxford, Oxfordshire

== June 12, 1959 (Friday) ==
- Construction began on HMS Dreadnought (S101), the first British nuclear submarine. Prince Philip laid down the first steel at the Vickers-Armstrongs shipyard at Barrow-in-Furness. The sub was launched in 1960 and served until 1980.
- Singer Billie Holiday was arrested for heroin possession while in her room at New York's Metropolitan Hospital, where she had been since collapsing on May 31. Because she could not be moved, NYPD detectives fingerprinted her and took mug shots while she lay in bed, to face charges upon release. She would die, without regaining consciousness, on July 17.
- Born:
  - Beniamino Vignola, Italian football player; in Verona
  - John Linnell, American musician; in New York City

== June 13, 1959 (Saturday) ==
- Police in Angamaly, a city in India's Kerala state, fired into a crowd that was protesting against the elected Communist government of E. M. S. Namboodiripad, killing seven people. The incident led to the replacement of the state government, on July 31, by President's rule, under Article 356 of the Indian Constitution.
- Born:
  - Boyko Borisov, 3 time Prime Minister of Bulgaria; in Bankya
  - Maurice Dantec, science-fiction writer; in Grenoble (d. 2016)

== June 14, 1959 (Sunday) ==
- Dominican exiles, aided by Fidel Castro, invaded the Dominican Republic on three fronts, with the objective of overthrowing dictator Rafael Leónidas Trujillo. At Estero Hondo and at Maimon, the rebels rowed in from ships stationed offshore, while a smaller group landed a C-46 transport at Constanza. Alerted to the invasion by its own spies, the Dominican armed forces stopped the invasion by sea. In Constanza, where inaccurate bombing ended up killing more civilians than guerillas, most of the rebels were captured or killed by Dominican peasants in return for a cash bounty.
- During the Youth Day celebrations across the Soviet Union, an overcrowded bridge collapsed in the capital of the Kazakh SSR in Akmola (now Astana), and dropping people into the Ishim River. While the official report of the government said that six people died, subsequent interviews of eyewitnesses, made after the collapse of the Soviet Union, concluded while that around 140 people were killed, most by drowning in the river.
- At Disneyland in Anaheim, California, two new rides were opened in the Tomorrowland section. The Disneyland Monorail, the world's first regularly operating passenger-carrying monorail train (Alweg system), was dedicated by U.S. Vice President Richard Nixon. When Walt Disney took the Nixon family along for a test ride before the ceremony, the Secret Service detail was inadvertently left behind and the Vice President accidentally "kidnapped". On the same day, the Matterhorn Bobsleds, the world's first tubular steel roller coaster, was inaugurated.
- As beach goers in La Jolla, California, watched, 33-year-old Robert Pamperin was attacked and devoured by a 20-foot (6.1 m) great white shark, while skindiving 50 yards (46 m) from shore. No trace of Pamperin was found, and it was speculated that the shark had swallowed him whole.

== June 15, 1959 (Monday) ==
- A U.S. Navy P4M Mercator patrol plane was attacked by a pair of MiG-15 fighters over the Sea of Japan, 80 miles (130 km) east of Wonsan, North Korea. Tailgunner Donald E. Corder was severely wounded, and the plane landed at a U.S. base in Hiroshima, Japan.

== June 16, 1959 (Tuesday) ==
- The essay "Hai Rui Scolds the Emperor" appeared in the Chinese Communist paper People's Daily (Renmin Ribao), written by historian and Beijing vice-mayor Wu Han. Ostensibly about the criticism (in 1566) of a Ming dynasty Emperor, the article, and other Hai Rui essays that followed, was viewed as a veiled criticism of Chinese leader Mao Zedong and considered a factor in the backlash from the 1966 Cultural Revolution.
- François Tombalbaye became Prime Minister of Chad, which was scheduled to become independent of French Equatorial Africa. On August 10, 1960, Tombalbaye would become the new Republic of Chad's first President, serving until his death in a 1975 coup.
- In a White House meeting, President Eisenhower expressed his reservations about the placement of American medium range nuclear missiles in Turkey, noting that "if Mexico or Cuba had been penetrated by the Communists, and then began getting arms and missiles from them ... it would be imperative for us to take positive action, even offensive military action." The presence of the Jupiter missiles in Turkey was later believed to be one of the factors in the placement of Soviet missiles in Cuba, which precipitated the Cuban Missile Crisis of 1962.
- Died: Actor George Reeves, who played the title role on the television program The Adventures of Superman, was found dead, in his Beverly Hills home, from a single gunshot to his head. Because the gun was wiped clean of fingerprints, and there were no powder burns on his hand, the conclusion that he had killed himself has been disputed.

== June 17, 1959 (Wednesday) ==
- A jury in London awarded Liberace $22,400 in his libel suit against the London Daily Mirror. The Mirror's columnist, William Connor, had described the flamboyant pianist as homosexual.
- Éamon de Valera, the longtime Taoiseach (Prime Minister) of Ireland, was elected to the largely ceremonial post of President of Ireland, defeating challenger Sean MacEoin by a margin of 538,000 to 418,000.
- The government of Chile created the Laguna San Rafael National Park, with an area of 17,420 km^{2}.
- Born: Adrie van der Poel, Dutch cyclist; in Bergen op Zoom, Netherlands
- Died: Joseph Barbara, 53, owner of the estate in Apalachin, New York, where the Apalachin Meeting of Mafia bosses had taken place, died of a heart attack.

== June 18, 1959 (Thursday) ==
- Queen Elizabeth II arrived in Newfoundland to begin a 45-day tour of Canada. In the longest stay ever by a Canadian monarch, she traveled 15,000 miles and was seen by more than a million people.
- The U.S. Supreme Court ruled that an Arkansas law that had closed public schools at the beginning of the 1958–59 academic year was unconstitutional. Following the 1957 integration of Central High School in Little Rock, the Arkansas Legislature had closed the schools.
- A centrifuge program was conducted at Johnsville, Pennsylvania, to investigate the role of a pilot in the launch of a multi-stage vehicle. Test subjects were required to perform boost-control tasks, while being subjected to the proper boost-control accelerations. The highest g-force experienced was 15, and none of the test subjects felt they reached the limit of their control capability. One of the test subjects, Neil Armstrong, was later selected as a NASA astronaut for the Gemini program in September 1962.
- William Shea and Branch Rickey announced plans for a third major baseball league that was tentatively named the Continental League, to be made up of eight cities not represented in either the American or National Leagues.
- Died: Ethel Barrymore, 79, American stage and screen actress

== June 19, 1959 (Friday) ==
- U.S. Defense Secretary Neil H. McElroy approved the DOD's air defense master plan, providing for procurement of KC-135 tankers, and B-52G, B-58, and B-70 bombers, and increased deployment of Atlas, Tian and Minuteman missiles.
- The Mercury Capsule Coordination Office was organized within the Space Task Group, heade by J. A. Chamberlin. A Capsule Review Board, chaired by Paul E. Purser, would regularly review action taken by the Office. .

== June 20, 1959 (Saturday) ==
- The Soviet Union reversed plans to provide China with a prototype atomic bomb, and secretly informed the Beijing government that it would not supply technical data for constructing more nuclear weapons, unilaterally cancelling an accord reached on October 15, 1957. Nikita Khrushchev noted later in his memoirs that the working bomb and its blueprints had been packed and ready for shipment, but that the Soviets then decided against sharing their secrets. The Chinese would initiate Project 596 and detonate their first bomb in 1964.
- The collision of an express train with a bus killed 45 bus passengers at the town of Lauffen am Neckar in West Germany's Baden-Württemberg state. The bus had been running late in its transport of people from the Leonbronn station who were trying to reach the Lauffen train station for a connection to Würzburg. The keeper who had put the safety barrier across the road lifted it and waved the bus through, without checking first with the German Railways to make sure nothing was coming. The E 867 express train from Stuttgart— ironically, the train to Würzburg which the passengers were planning to board— raced into the station just as it was coming into the Lauffen station.

== June 21, 1959 (Sunday) ==
- Winnipeg, Manitoba, became the first city in North America to adopt the 999 number for emergency services. The first 9-1-1 service in the U.S would be not be inaugurated until February 16, 1968, set up in Haleyville, Alabama.
- Minnesota's Lake of the Woods, which bills itself as the "Walleye Capital of the World", erected its 40-foot-long (12 m) statue of "Willie Walleye".
- Hank Aaron, who hit 755 home runs in his major league baseball career, his only game with more than two home runs. He hit three homers, for six RBIs, in the Milwaukee Braves' win over the Giants in San Francisco.
- Born: Kathy Mattea, American country singer; in South Charleston, West Virginia

== June 22, 1959 (Monday) ==
- The first multinational treaty on nuclear security came into force. The OECD Convention on the Establishment of a Security Control in the Field of Nuclear Energy had been signed by the nations of Western Europe, along with the United States and Canada, on December 20, 1957.
- H. Kurt Strass of STG's Flight Systems Division (FSD) recommended the establishment a committee to consider designs for a space laboratory for two astronauts. The proposed "two-man Mercury" mission would evolve into Project Gemini.
- Born: Ed Viesturs, American mountaineer, in Rockford, Illinois
- Died: Bruce Harlan, 33, U.S. gold medalist in diving at the 1948 Olympics, died one day after falling 27 feet (8.2 m) while dismantling scaffolding at the close of a diving exhibition in Norwalk, Connecticut.

== June 23, 1959 (Tuesday) ==
- In Africa, the Central African Republic, Chad, Congo (Brazzaville) and Gabon signed a treaty in Brazzaville to create the Union Douaniere Equatorial (UDE) to establish a customs union.
- Seán Lemass took office as Taoiseach of Ireland following elections to replace Éamon de Valera, and began a course of pursuing peaceful cooperation, rather than unification, with Northern Ireland.
- Technical evaluation of proposals for tracking Mercury missions began at Langley Research Center, with an invitation to Western Electric, Radio Corporation of America (RCA), Pan American Airways, Brown and Root, Chrysler Corporation, and Philco Corporation to submit designs.
- Died: French author Boris Vian, 39, died suddenly while watching a film adaptation of his novel I Spit on Your Graves.

== June 24, 1959 (Wednesday) ==
- Klaus Fuchs, who had given America's atomic bomb and hydrogen bomb secrets to the Soviet Union, was quietly released from a British prison after serving nine years of a 14-year sentence for espionage. He traveled as "Mr. Strauss" on a LOT Airlines flight from London to East Berlin, where he lived until his death in 1988.
- Negotiations for contracts for eight Redstone rockets for Project Mercury were completed with a final cost of $20.1 million, higher than the original estimate of $15.5 million.
- Porgy and Bess, the widescreen Technicolor film of the classic Gershwin opera, was released to mixed reviews and poor ticket sales. Its two leads, Sidney Poitier and Dorothy Dandridge, as well as Diahann Carroll, had their singing voices dubbed by others, while Sammy Davis, Jr., Pearl Bailey, and Brock Peters did their own singing. The work was changed from being a full-fledged opera to an operetta simply by removing about a third of the music and having the words to many of the operatic portions spoken instead of sung. A more critically acclaimed, more faithful, and more complete version of Porgy and Bess was telecast by PBS in 1993.

== June 25, 1959 (Thursday) ==
- Taking advantage of a clause in the new U.S. copyright law, cartoonist Max Fleischer exercised an exclusive right to renew the soon-to-expire copyright on Betty Boop. Max's son Richard would later recount that attorney Stanley Handman had happened to read, in The Wall Street Journal, "the article that would change our lives forever", with merchandising rights to the popular 1940s cartoon.
- Spree killer Charles Starkweather, who had murdered 11 people in 1958, was executed in the electric chair at the Nebraska State Penitentiary.
- Laurence K. Loftin, Jr., of Langley Research Center, began a two-day presentation on a projected crewed space station to the Research Steering Committee on Manned Space Flight. Committee Chairman Harry J. Goett concluded that space stations and orbiting laboratories should be considered as an integral part of coordinated planning for a lunar landing. George M. Low of NASA Headquarters warned that in each successive step in NASA's missions, care should be taken to consider the principal objective of landing on the Moon because the number of steps that could be funded and attempted was extremely limited. Low's thinking and the Steering Committee's recommendations would influence NASA into shifting the focus of the human spaceflight program away from ideas of large space stations and laboratories, and toward lunar flight and the Apollo program.)

== June 26, 1959 (Friday) ==
- All 68 people aboard TWA Flight 891 were killed when the Lockheed Starliner exploded in midair and then crashed near the Italian town of Marnate, 15 minutes after taking off from Milan toward Paris. An investigation concluded that the plane had been struck by lightning, which ignited vapors in a fuel tank.
- Queen Elizabeth II, Canadian Prime Minister John Diefenbaker and U.S. President Dwight D. Eisenhower officially opened the Saint Lawrence Seaway.
- Japan's Emperor Hirohito became the first Japanese monarch to attend a baseball game. Nagashima Shigeo, the most popular player at that time, led the Yomiuri Giants to a win over the Hanshin Tigers with a dramatic ninth-inning home run.
- Ingemar Johansson of Sweden became the world heavyweight boxing champion when he knocked out champ Floyd Patterson in a bout at Yankee Stadium. The two would meet for a rematch on June 20, 1960, with Patterson reclaiming his crown in the fifth round.
- Born: Mark McKinney, Canadian-born comedian known for The Kids in the Hall and Saturday Night Live; in Ottawa

== June 27, 1959 (Saturday) ==
- Voters in Hawaii went to the polls on the question of whether to become the 50th state of the United States of America. The result was 132,938 in favor, and 7,854 not. Only one of the 240 precincts went against statehood, with voters on the island of Niihau 70 to 18 against.

== June 28, 1959 (Sunday) ==
- The Ethiopian Orthodox Church was created as a separate entity from Egypt's Coptic Christian church. Egypt's Pope Cyril VI appointed Bishop Abuna Basilios as the patriarch of the church, with authority to consecrate his bishops within the Ethiopian church.
- At Meldrim, Georgia, 17 people were burned to death while swimming in the Ogeechee River. The beach area was beneath a 30-foot (9.1 m) railroad trestle, and as the train moved over the bridge, two tanker cars exploded, sending a blanket of flames onto a crowd of 175 people below.

== June 29, 1959 (Monday) ==
- Pope John XXIII issued his first encyclical, Ad Petri Cathedram, prior to the opening of the Second Vatican Council. The papal letter emphasized that a renewal of the Roman Catholic Church would precede a reunion with other Christian denominations.

== June 30, 1959 (Tuesday) ==
- On the island of Okinawa, 21 students were killed and more than 100 were injured when an American F-100 plane crashed into Miamori Elementary School at Ishikawa, Japan. The pilot had ejected after the plane malfunctioned and struck the school.
- One of the oddest incidents in MLB history happened when two baseballs were in play at the same time during the Cardinals-Cubs game. Umpire Vic Delmore had handed a new baseball to Cubs' pitcher Bob Anderson while Cubs' third baseman Alvin Dark had retrieved a ball that was still in play. As the Cards' Stan Musial reached second base, both Anderson and Dark threw a baseball his way. Musial ran for third when he saw Anderson's throw sail past him, and was tagged out by Ernie Banks, who had caught the ball thrown by Dark. After ten minutes, the umpires ruled that Musial was out. The Cardinals won anyway, 4–1, so no protest was lodged.
- Born: Vincent D'Onofrio, American actor, in Brooklyn
