= Zaber =

River in Germany

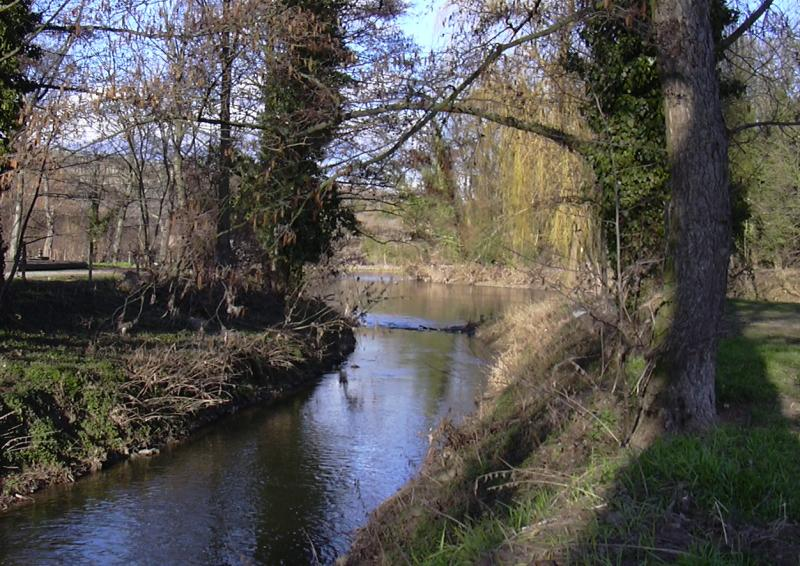
- Zaber at its confluence with the Neckar at Lauffen am Neckar

- Mouth of the Zaber

Location
- Country: Germany
- State: Baden-Württemberg

Physical characteristics
- Source
  - location: Near Zaberfeld
  - elevation: 316 m (1,037 ft)
- Mouth
  - location: Neckar at Lauffen am Neckar
  - coordinates: 49.0785°N 9.1550°E
- Length: 22.5 km (14.0 mi)

Basin features
- Progression: Neckar→ Rhine→ North Sea

The Zaber (German: [ˈtsaːbɐ]) is a minor tributary of the River Neckar in Baden-Württemberg, Germany. It is some 22 km in length and joins the Neckar from the west at Lauffen am Neckar. It has given its name to the Zabergäu, the area between the Heuchelberg and Stromberg hills.

== Name ==
The first mention is from the year 793 as Zabernahgouwe (Zabernachgau). Traditionally it is assumed that the name is derived from the Latin word Taberna ("restaurant", "street station"). It is assumed that the Roman settlement in today's Meimsheim bore this name (similar to the Alsatian place Zabern) and that with time the place name was transferred to the surroundings or to the river. This theory is supported by the fact that there was a traffic junction in Roman Meimsheim and that the place was possibly of administrative importance for the region.

The region known as the Zabergäu, the area between the Heuchelberg and Stromberg hills, takes its name from the Zaber.

== Geography ==
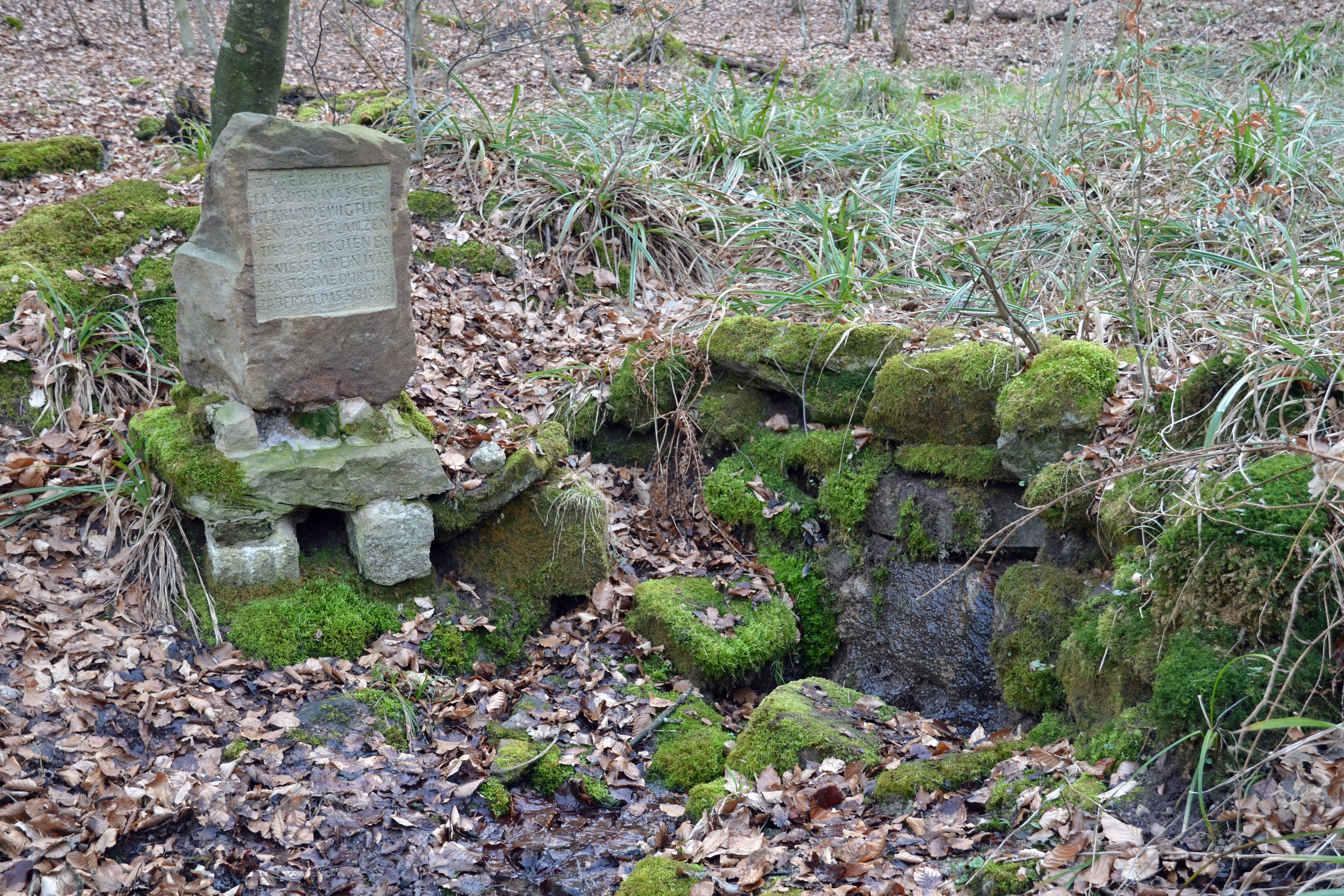
Ursprung der Zaber bei Zaberfeld

=== Sources ===
The Zaber rises in the district of Heilbronn about two kilometres south-southwest of Zaberfeld on the northern slope of the forested Stromberg (landscape). It flows initially into a reservoir known as the Ehmetsklinge. It subsequently flows in an easterly direction through Zaberfeld, Pfaffenhofen, Güglingen and Brackenheim before reaching the Neckar at Lauffen. The river is shallow and therefore not navigable.

Tributaries of the Zaber
| Name | side of confluence | Length [km] (Note: Nach LUBW-FG10 (Datensatzeinträge).) | Basin size in km² | remaining Length in m | Location of confluence | elevation | Annotations |
|---|---|---|---|---|---|---|---|
| Zaber | – | 22,4 | 113,8 | – | Lauffen am Neckar | 161 | |
| Lochwiesenbächle | left | 1,1 | | 20.614 | in reservoir Ehmetsklinge (zus. 13,2 ha Nach LUBW-SG10.) | 232 | |
| Ehmetsklingenbächle | left | 2,6 | 2,3 | 20.359 | in reservoir Ehmetsklinge | 232 | länger als Zaber |
| Riesenbach | left | 3,2 | 4,9 | 19.692 | Au W Zaberfeld | 220 | |
| Dämmlesgraben | rechts | 1,8 | | 19.259 | Zaberfeld, Herrenwiesenweg | 218 | im Dorf verdolt |
| Muttersbach | left | 1,6 | 2,6 | 19.245 | Zaberfeld, Herrenwiesenweg | 218 | |
| Katzenbach | rechts | 2,0 | 3,4 | 18.091 | Sportgelände E Zaberfeld | 212 | |
| Michelbach | left | 4,3 | 6,3 | 17.609 | between Reisenmühle u. Weiler an der Zaber | 203 | flows first through a reservoir |
| (Bach aus der Steinenklinge) | rechts | 1,3 | | 16.671 | Weiler an der Zaber, Bogersmühle | 202 | |
| Benzbach | left | 1,4 | | 15.522 | In front of road bridge in Pfaffenhofen | 201 | ab Dorfrand verdolt |
| Rodbach | rechts | 2,2 | 2,2 | 15.311 | Sportstätten in Pfaffenhofen | 200 | ab Dorfrand verdolt |
| (Zufluss aus der Leopoldsklinge) | rechts | 1,5 | | 14.577 | Umspannwerk vor Güglingen | 196 | |
| Flügelaubach | rechts | 3,5 | 3,5 | 12.526 | Güglingen, ggü. Sophienhof | 194 | |
| Riedfurtbach | left | 3,8 | 3,4 | 11.476 | Mühle S Güglingen-Frauenzimmern | 191 | |
| (Sägmühlkanal) | rechts | 1,3 | | 11.444 | Mühle S Güglingen-Frauenzimmern | 190 | mit längerem Ast Balzhöfer Bach 2,635 km |
| Fürtlesbach | rechts | 3,5 | 3,2 | 10.587 | opposite the industrial estate Güglingen-Frauenzimmern | 188 | |
| Wurmbach | left | 4,0 | 7,3 | 9.928 | wastewater treatment plant next to the border with Brackenheim | 185 | |
| Forstbach | left | 7,2 | 11,0 | 7.239 | NSG Zaberauen von Meimsheim und Botenheim vor Brackenheim-Meimsheim | 181 | |
| Herrenwiesenbach | rechts | 7,4 | 11,1 | 6.738 | uh. Zabergäubahn-bridge net to Brackenheim-Meimsheim | 180 | |
| Truselbach | rechts | 3,6 | | 5.282 | Brackenheim, Obere Schellenmühle | | |
| Neipperger Bächle | left | 8,9 | 14,1 | 3.828 | wastewater treatment plant before the Lauffener Neckarschlinge | 170 | |
