= Zabergäu Railway =

Railway line in Germany

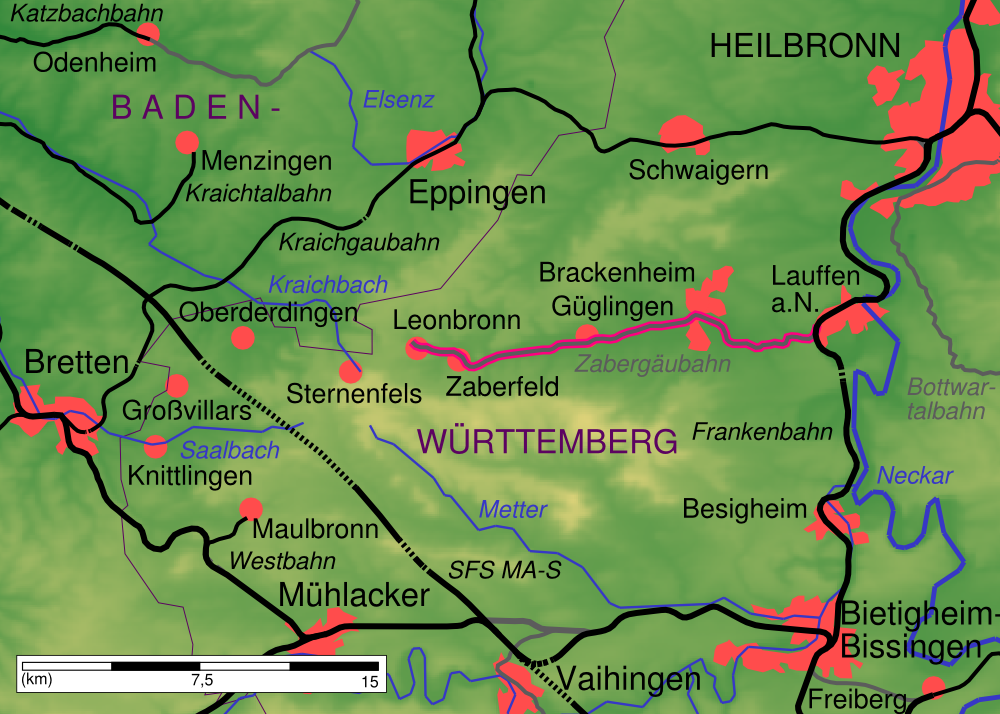

Overview
- Native name: Zabergäubahn
- Line number: 4901
- Locale: Baden-Württemberg, Germany

Service
- Route number: 781 (to 1986)

Technical
- Line length: 20.3 km (12.6 mi)
- Track gauge: 1,435 mm (4 ft 8 1/2 in) standard gauge (after 1964/65)
- Old gauge: 750 mm (2 ft 5 1/2 in) (until 1964/65)
- Minimum radius: 150 m (492 ft)
- Operating speed: narrow gauge: 25 km/h (15.5 mph); standard gauge: 60 km/h (37.3 mph)
- Maximum incline: 1.7%

The Zabergäu Railway (Zabergäubahn) was a spur line from the Franconia Railway. It ran for 20.3 km from Lauffen am Neckar to Leonbronn through an area known as the Zabergäu. Originally built with narrow gauge, it was converted to standard gauge in the 1960s.

== History ==
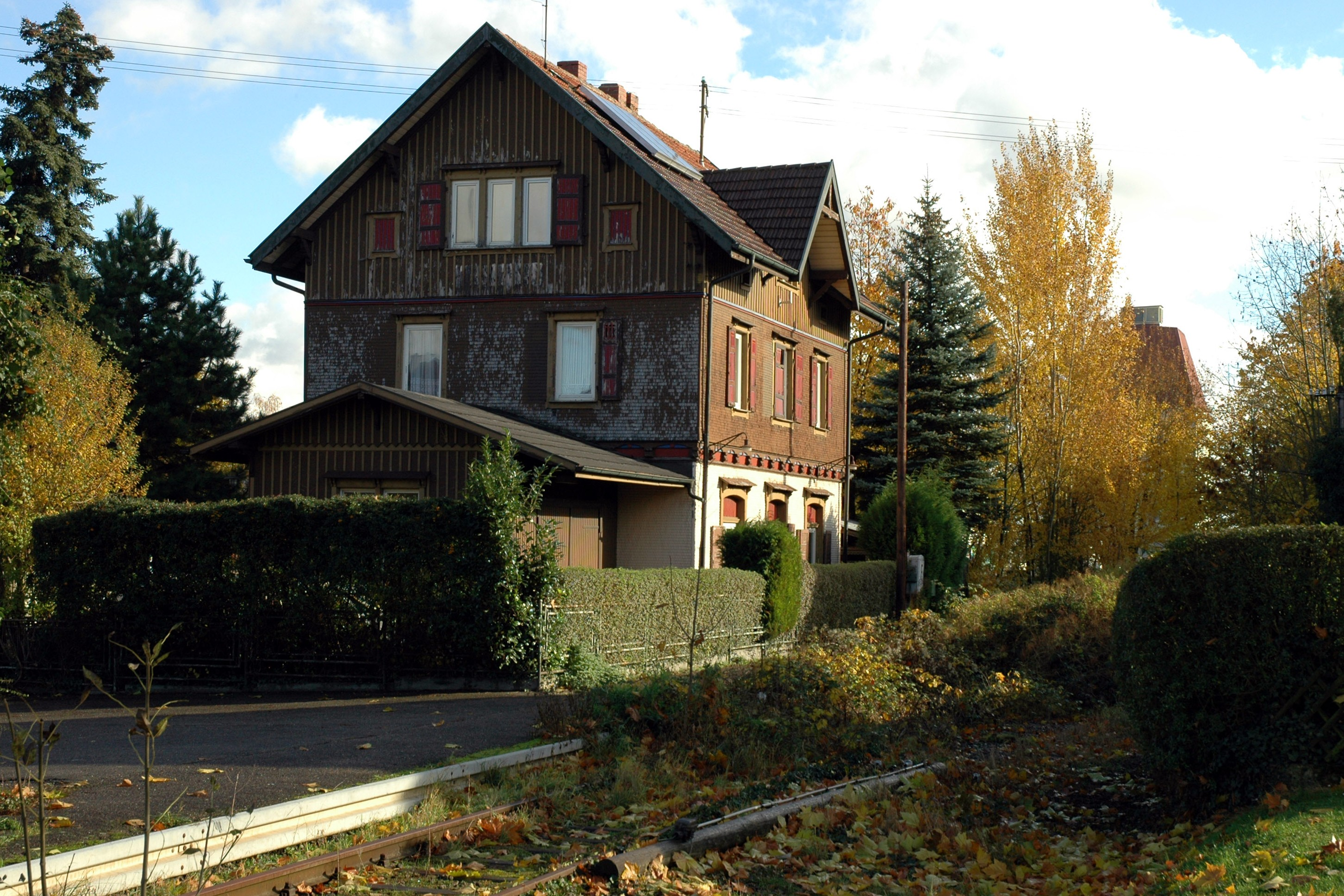
Station building at Brackenheim (November 2006)

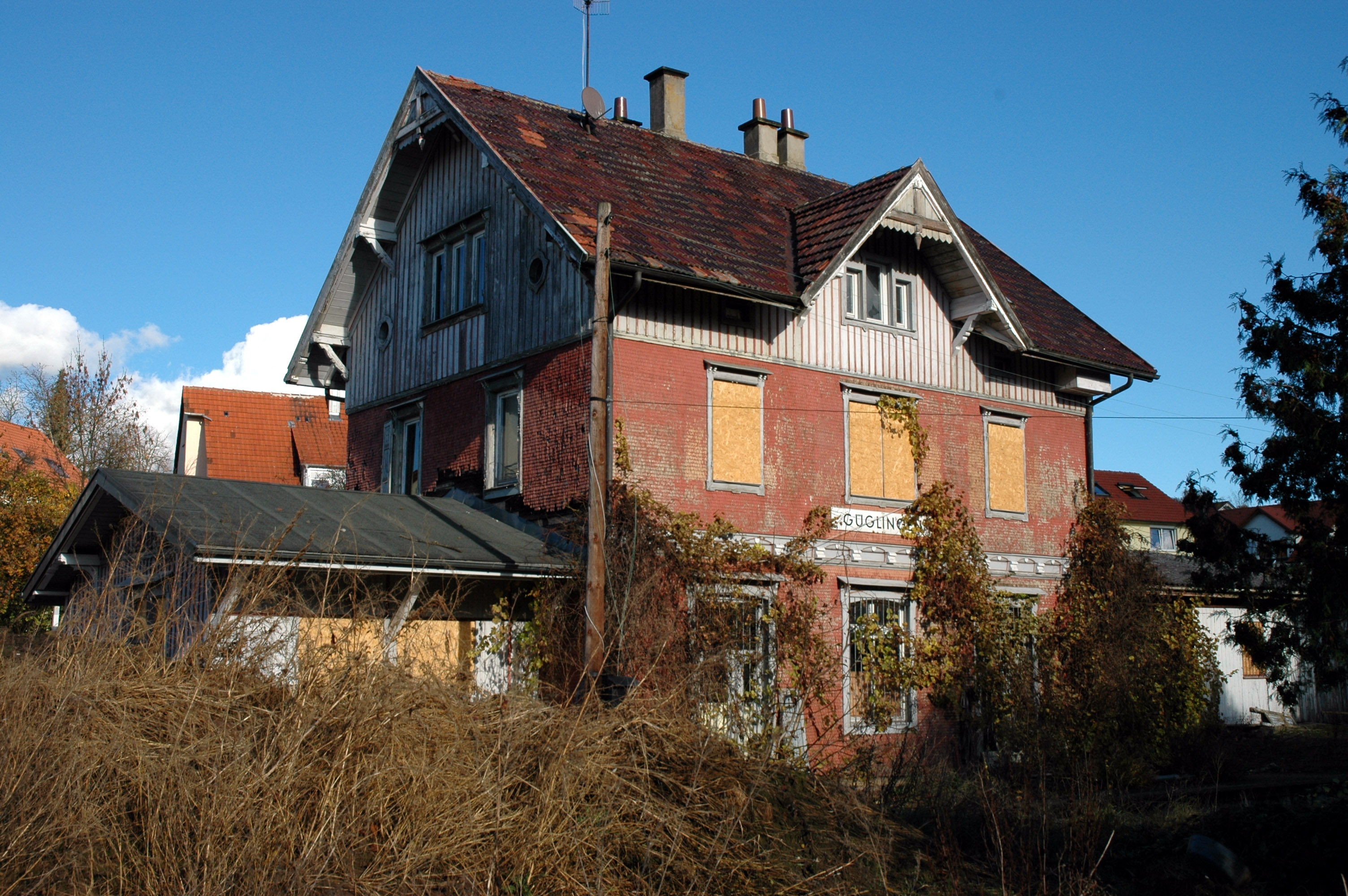
Station building at Güglingen (November 2006)

On 28 August 1896, the Royal Württemberg State Railways opened a narrow-gauge line (width 750 mm (2 ft 5 1/2 in)) from Lauffen am Neckar to Güglingen. In April 1901, work began on an extension to Leonbronn which was opened on 18 October of the same year.

However, the small village of Leonbronn was not intended to remain as a terminus. The five villages of Sternenfels, Kürnbach, Oberderdingen, Großvillars and Knittlingen, which lie further to the west, also wanted a rail link which would have joined the Zabergäu to the town of Bretten. The latter was conveniently situated at the junction of the Württemberg Western Railway, running from Stuttgart to Bruchsal, and the Kraichgau Railway, which linked Karlsruhe and Heilbronn.

However, the Royal Württemberg State Railways concluded that a westerly extension would not prove profitable. Instead, even before the outbreak of World War I, the Baden State Railways had started work on a standard-gauge branch line from Bretten to Kürnbach. However, the Deutsche Reichsbahn, the post-war successor to the Baden State Railways, had other priorities and the work was accordingly discontinued. Yet a legacy of these original plans survives to this day as the station at Knittlingen. This was never used as originally intended, but still bears the station name.

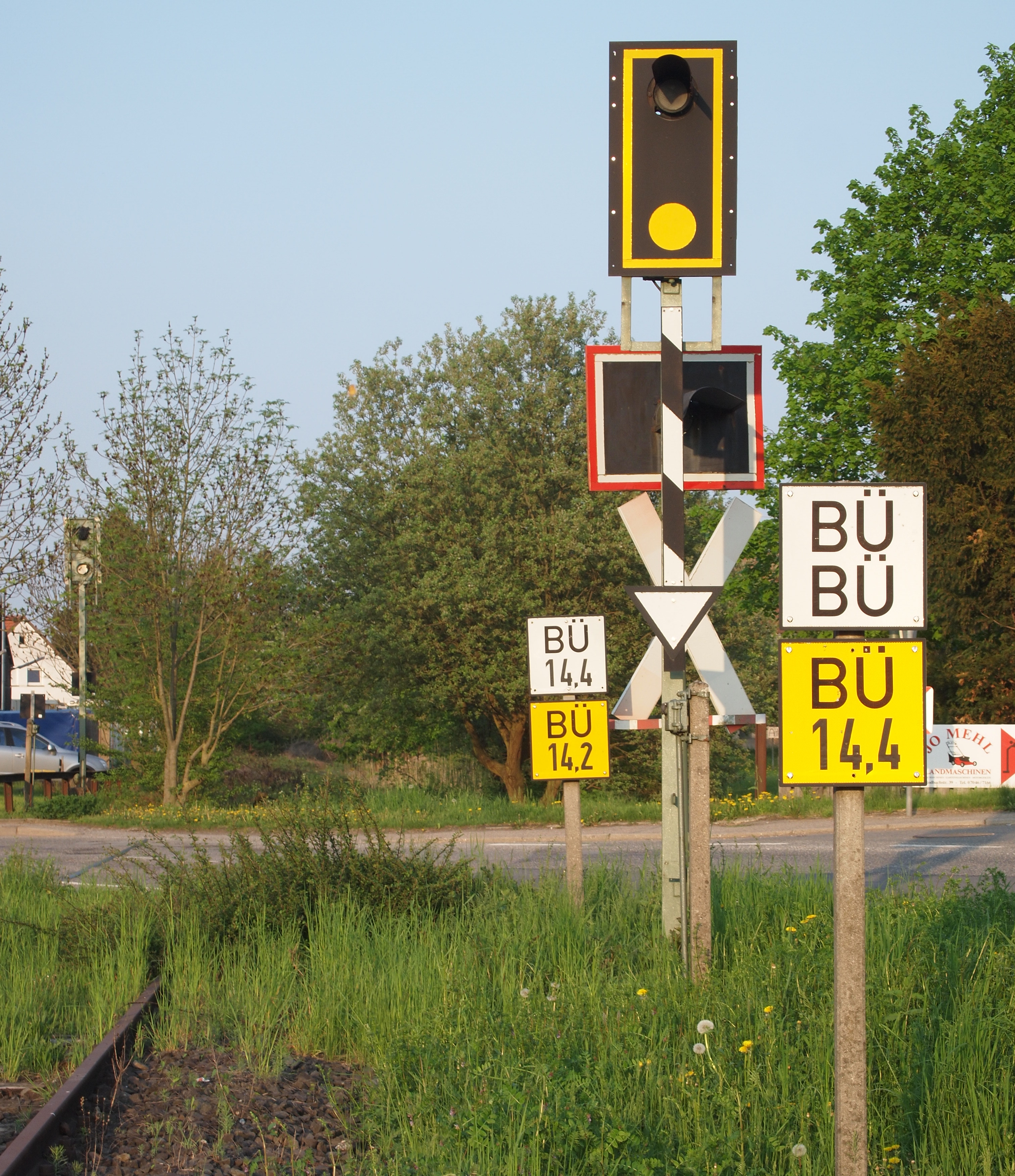
Level crossing in Pfaffenhofen, 2013

The narrow-gauge Zabergäu Railway did not meet modern requirements after World War II and, as early as 1954, the Deutsche Bundesbahn (German Federal Railway) introduced a parallel bus service with corresponding reductions to the passenger train timetable. On 20 June 1959, there was a serious accident when a railway bus was hit by a train operated by the Franconia Railway on the level crossing at Lauffen am Neckar. The bus, which was full of passengers, was dragged for 400 m along the track and 45 people lost their lives. In the wake of the Lauffen bus crash, the villages and local businesses along the route set up the 'Zabergäu Action Group'. The latter succeeded in having the railway timetable re-established, the track re-laid with standard gauge and the line modernised. The conversion work was carried out in phases between 3 May 1964 and 25 July 1965. These improvements included the removal of many level crossings and resulted in the maximum speed of 25 km/h being increased to 60 km/h. This achieved a reduction in the journey time between the two terminuses from 69 to 35 minutes.

The passenger service was discontinued on 25 July 1986 but goods trains, which carried mainly agricultural freight, continued to run until 25 September 1994. Today there is no longer any track from the station at Lauffen and the route is officially closed.

== Future plans ==
According to plans drawn up in 2005, a service between Lauffen am Neckar and Zaberfeld along the old Zabergäu route was to be re-established by 2011 as part of the Heilbronn Stadtbahn network. However, a press report in July 2006 again questioned the financial feasibility of the project. Instead the new 'Northern Branch' between Heilbronn and Neckarsulm would be given priority. The Zabergäu route, which would be known as the 'Southern Branch', would probably not be considered until the 'Northern Branch' had been completed. Most of the level crossings had meanwhile been asphalted over and would need to be restored. It has now been made quite clear that for reasons of cost there are no immediate plans to continue the tramway along the old railway route.
