= Lauffen bus crash =

1959 transport incident in Germany

Coordinates: 49°04′08″N 9°07′58″E

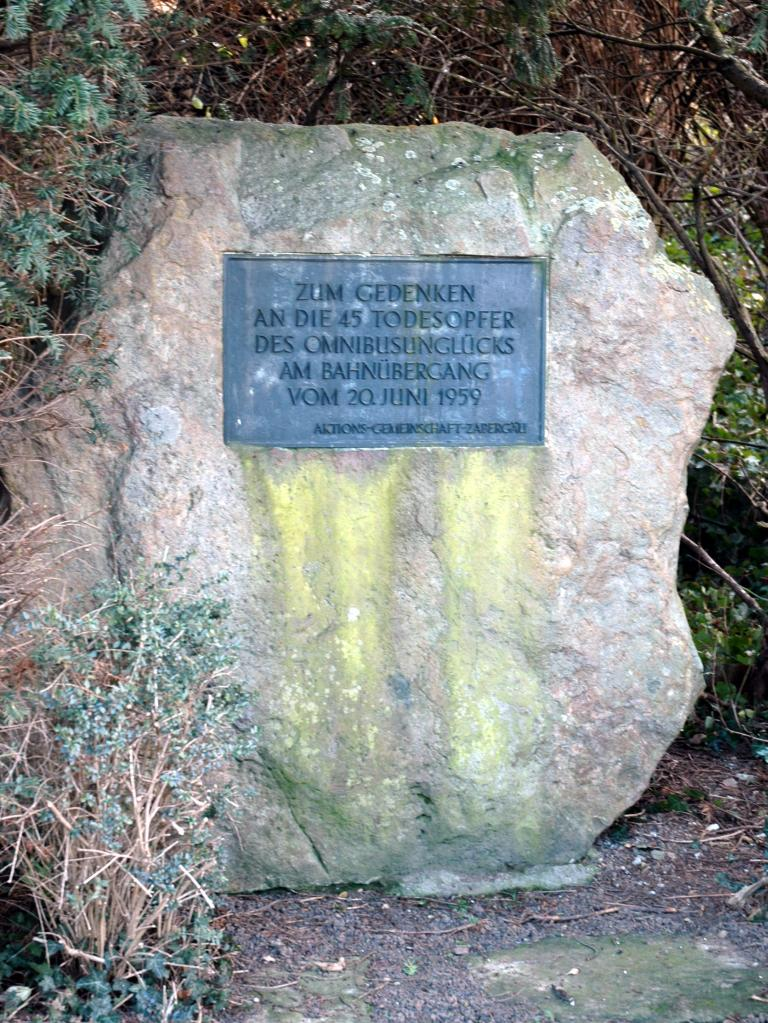
Memorial to the victims of the disaster

The Lauffen bus crash of 20 June 1959 resulted in the deaths of 45 people. At the time it was the worst accident involving a bus since the end of the Second World War.

A bus chartered by German Railways on a regular service collided with an express train on the Tübingen to Würzburg (via Stuttgart) route at level crossing number 47 at Lauffen am Neckar. In all, 45 people were killed and 27 others were seriously injured.

The bus was operating a rail replacement service for the Zabergäu Railway along the stretch from Leonbronn to Lauffen. A timetable reduction had been introduced along this narrow gauge line in 1954. According to the accounts of former railway workers, the bus was running late, but the passengers were anxious to catch the connection from Lauffen to Würzburg. The level crossing keeper re-opened the barrier to allow the bus to cross but failed to first check with the train controller.

The accident increased public pressure on the state of Baden-Württemberg and German railways to make the service along the Zabergäu Railway more attractive to passengers, and was one of the decisive factors in bringing about a re-gauging of this route from narrow to conventional gauge between 1964 and 1965.

Horst Siebecke's Schallplatte des Jahres 1959 (LP of 1959) recalls the accident as being one of the most important events of the year. A memorial was later erected at the place where the accident occurred and a commemorative ceremony was held there on the 50th anniversary.
