= Nurmukhambet Kozhakhmetov =

- Нұрмұхамбет Қожахметов
- Born: 1935; Karashilik, Kokshetau region
- Died: May 6, 1960 (aged 25); Akmola, Kazakh SSR
- Cause of death: Murdered by Almagashev
- Years active: 1952–1960
- Organization: Ministry of Internal Affairs of the USSR
- Known for: Only rescuer during the Akmola tragedy
- Partner: Sofia Kozhakhmetova
- Awards: (1961)

Nurmukhambet Kozhakhmetov (Note: Writing from Kazakh variant – Nūrmūkhambet Qojakhmetov) (kaz. Нұрмұхамбет Қожахметов; 1935, USSR – 6 may 1960, Akmola) was a junior sergeant of the militia and a recipient of the Order of the Red Star. Only policeman who saved lives during the Akmola tragedy in 1959.

== Biography ==
Father — Toktamishev Kozhakhmet, mother — Khairulina Nafisa, wife — Safia. During the Akmola tragedy of 14 June 1959, when a bridge collapsed, he saved the lives of dozens of people.

== Death ==
Nurmukhambet left home and was on his way to the Kazakhselmash plant. However, he never reached his destination that day. As he was riding a bus, he heard a man shouting ahead of him:

“People are fighting near the shop! Help!”

Nurmukhambet suddenly jumped off the bus and ran toward the shop. When he arrived, he saw one man beating another. The victim’s pale face was covered in blood. Nurmukhambet immediately recognized the attacker—it was a well-known criminal to the militia named Mukishkev. Shouts were heard: “Don’t come closer! I’ll kill you!”

Nurmukhambet engaged Mukishkev in a fight. Mukishkev was drunk and armed, while Nurmukhambet had nothing. Nevertheless, Nurmukhambet showed great courage and managed to seize Mukishkev. Then another voice came from the crowd: “Hey, let the guy go!” Nurmukhambet realized it was one of Mukishkev’s friends. He recognized him as Almagashev, who had raped and murdered a girl in Karaganda.

Suddenly, a woman screamed: “The militia have arrived!” Nurmukhambet’s colleagues, Konakbayev and Kutzhanov, arrived. Together they put Mukishkev and Almagashev into a vehicle. While Kozhakhmetov and Konakbayev were trying to calm the rioting Mukishkev, Almagashev pulled out a knife and inflicted six severe wounds on Nurmukhambet. Gathering his last strength, Nurmukhambet shot Almagashev dead. He himself also died at the scene.

— Kuznetsov Y.

== Awards ==
Order of the Red Star — 21 January 1961

Decree No. 45

On awarding N. Kozhakhmetov the Order of the Red Star:

For the courage shown in maintaining public order and for exemplary performance of his official duty, I hereby award Junior Sergeant of the Militia Nurmukhambet Kozhakhmetov with the Order of the Red Star.

— Chairman of the Presidium of the Supreme Soviet of the USSR, L. Brezhnev; Secretary of the Presidium of the Supreme Soviet of the USSR, I. Georgadze

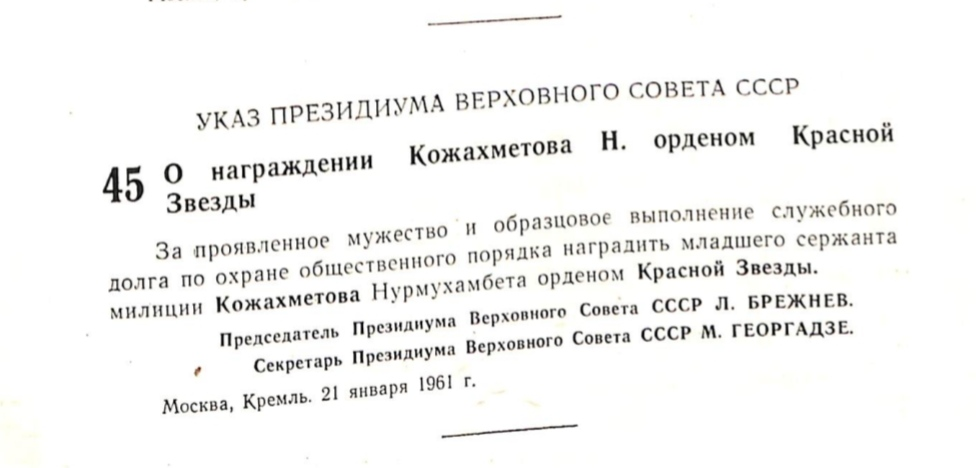

== Commemoration ==
One of the streets of the city of Astana bears the name Nurmukhambet Kozhakhmetov Street.

== Memory ==
=== Bibliography ===
- 1967 — «Blue coatwear»
- 1972 — «Forever in the memory of people»
- 2026 — «Nurmukhambet Kozhakhmetov: Feat in Akmolinsk»
