= Akmola tragedy =

1959 disaster in the Kazakh SSR, Soviet Union

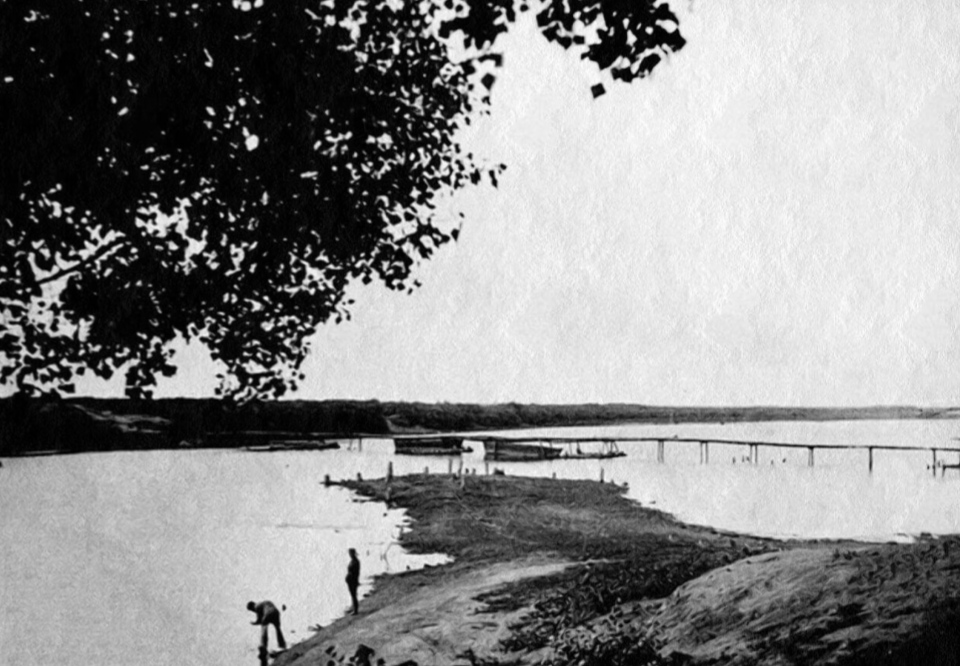
The bridge on the Ishim in Akmola, 1930

The Akmola tragedy (Kazakh: Ақмола апаты, romanized: Aqmola apaty, Russian: Акмолинская трагедия, romanized: Akmolinskaya tragediya) was a major disaster that occurred in the city of Akmola on 14 June 1959.

== Chronology of events ==
On 13 June 1959, young people from across the entire region arrived in Akmola to take part in commemmorating Soviet Youth Day. A regional youth festival was being held. On the second day of the festival — 14 June, at 13:46 local time (UTC+5), the bridge over the Ishim river in Akmola was unable to withstand the load and collapsed. The only police officer present that day together with his spouse, Nurmukhambet Kozhakhmetov, began rescuing people who were drowning. Because the incident occurred during festive events, people did not immediately realize how the bridge in front of them had collapsed.

Since reaching the left bank of Akmola was practically impossible, ambulances and emergency services arrived only from the right bank.

"... The regional youth festival was taking place. Nurmukhambet and Sofia were in the festival camp and walking in the park. While returning home, a tragic event occurred on the bridge over the Yesil River: due to the large crowd, part of the bridge collapsed. Amid the chaos and noise, it was impossible to understand what was happening. People were falling into the water. Sofia also fell. Her bright, light-colored dress flashed into view for a moment ..."

— A. Shaul, Y. Kuznetsov, Blue overcoat, page 22

== Classification ==
The Soviet government decided that such a disaster occurring during major celebrations was inappropriate for public coverage. All information about the tragedy was classified.

== Victims ==
Due to the classification of records by the Soviet authorities, the exact number of victims remains was reduced, and only 6 people were recorded as dead. According to estimates made with the help of eyewitnesses, the death toll was approximately 140 people.

== Aftermath ==
- In 1960, the head of the Kazakh SSR, Nikolai Belyaev, was dismissed from office;
- In 1961, Nurmukhambet Kozhakhmetov was awarded the Order of the Red Star;
- In 1963, a new concrete bridge was built in place of the old one.
