= Zaberfeld =

- Municipality
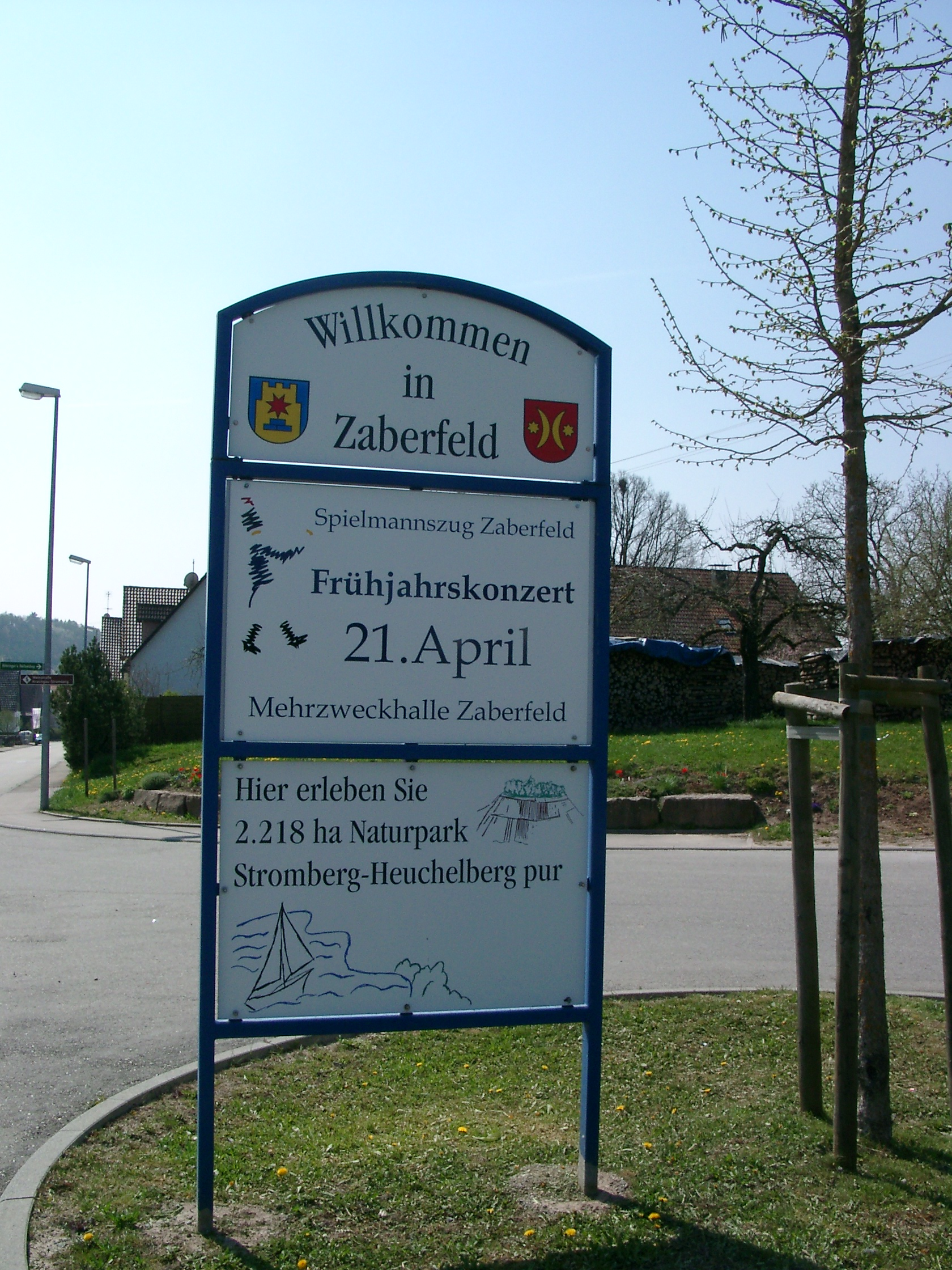

- Coat of arms

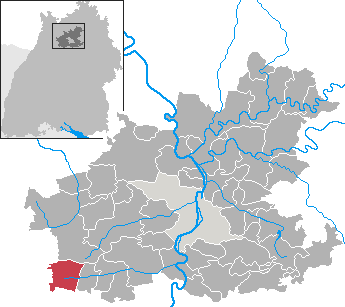
- Location of Zaberfeld within Heilbronn district
- Interactive map of Zaberfeld
- Location within Germany Location within Baden-Württemberg
- Coordinates: 49°3′N 8°56′E
- Country: Germany
- State: Baden-Württemberg
- Admin. region: Stuttgart
- District: Heilbronn
- Municipal assoc.: Oberes Zabergäu
- Subdivisions: 4

Government
  - Mayor (2020–28): Diana Danner

Area
  - Total: 22.18 km^{2} (8.56 sq mi)
- Elevation: 228 m (748 ft)

Population (2025-12-31)
  - Total: 4,157
  - Density: 187.4/km^{2} (485.4/sq mi)
- Time zone: UTC+01:00 (CET)
  - Summer (DST): UTC+02:00 (CEST)
- Postal codes: 74374
- Dialling codes: 07046
- Vehicle registration: HN
- Website: www.zaberfeld.de

Zaberfeld (German: [ˈtsaːbɐfɛlt]) is a town in the district of Heilbronn in Baden-Württemberg in Germany.

== Geography ==
Zaberfeld lies in the Zabergäu, in the southwestern corner of the Heilbronn district, at the head of the Zaber river.

=== Neighboring communities ===
Zaberfeld's neighbouring towns and communities are (clockwise, beginning in the north): Eppingen, Pfaffenhofen (both in the Heilbronn district), Sachsenheim (Ludwigsburg district), Sternenfels (Enzkreis), Kürnbach and Sulzfeld (both in the Karlsruhe district).

=== Base communities ===
The district of Zaberfeld is formed from Zaberfeld, Leonbronn, Michelbach and Ochsenburg.

== History ==
Zaberfeld was probably founded in 1000 AD. In 1321, it was ruled by the Herren von Magenheim of Baden. In 1355, Zaberfeld came under the rule of Württemberg and in 1749 became part of Württemberg. From 1390 to 1749 it was ruled by the Herren von Sternenfels as part of Württemberg under a feudal governing system. From 1807 to 1810 it was part of the Oberamt Güglingen. In 1810 it became part of Oberamt Brackenheim, until the breakup of Landkreis Heilbronn in 1938.

Michelbach was first recorded in 1276. In 1356 it came under the control of Württemberg which continued until 1749. In 1970 it was amalgamated with Zaberfeld.

Ochsenburg, was first recorded in 1231. It started as a small settlement and became a town in 1807. After the breakup of the settlement in the 1900s the town name Ochsenberg was briefly adopted. The change of name was desired by the town but was later cancelled.

Leonbronn was known as Lincbrunnen 1289. In 1971 it was merged with Ochsenburg into the new community of Burgbronn, which became part of Zaberfeld in 1975.

=== Dates of the formation of the villages into the present town ===
- On 1 July 1970, Zaberfeld and Michelbach am Heuchelberg joined to form the new town of Zaberfeld.
- On 1 January 1971, Leonbronn and Ochsenburg joined to form the new town of Burgbronn.
- On 1 January 1975, Zaberfeld and Burgbronn joined to form the new town of Zaberfeld.

=== Religion ===
Each of the former independent villages has their own Protestant church and parish. Pastoral care for Catholics is provided by a church dedicated to the Holy Trinity.

== Politics ==
=== Local Government ===
The local government of Zaberfeld consists of 12 seats on the local council whose chairman is the mayor. The last elections took place on 25 May 2014.

- Freie Wählervereinigung: 6 seats
- Unabhängige Wählervereinigung: 6 seats
Current coat of arms of Zaberfelds

Coat of arms before 1970

Coat of arms from 1970 to 1974

=== Structures ===
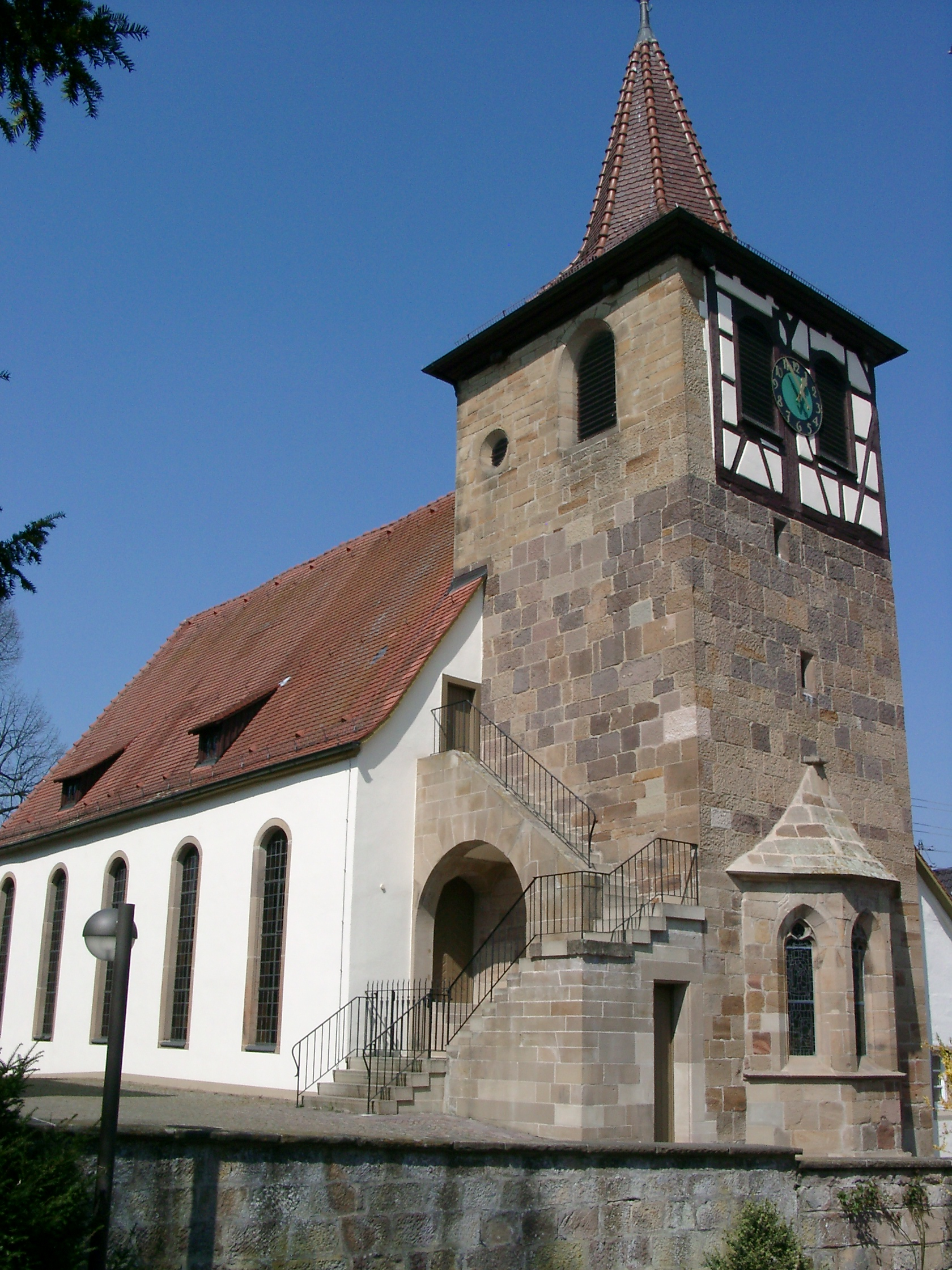
Parish Church of Zaberfeld

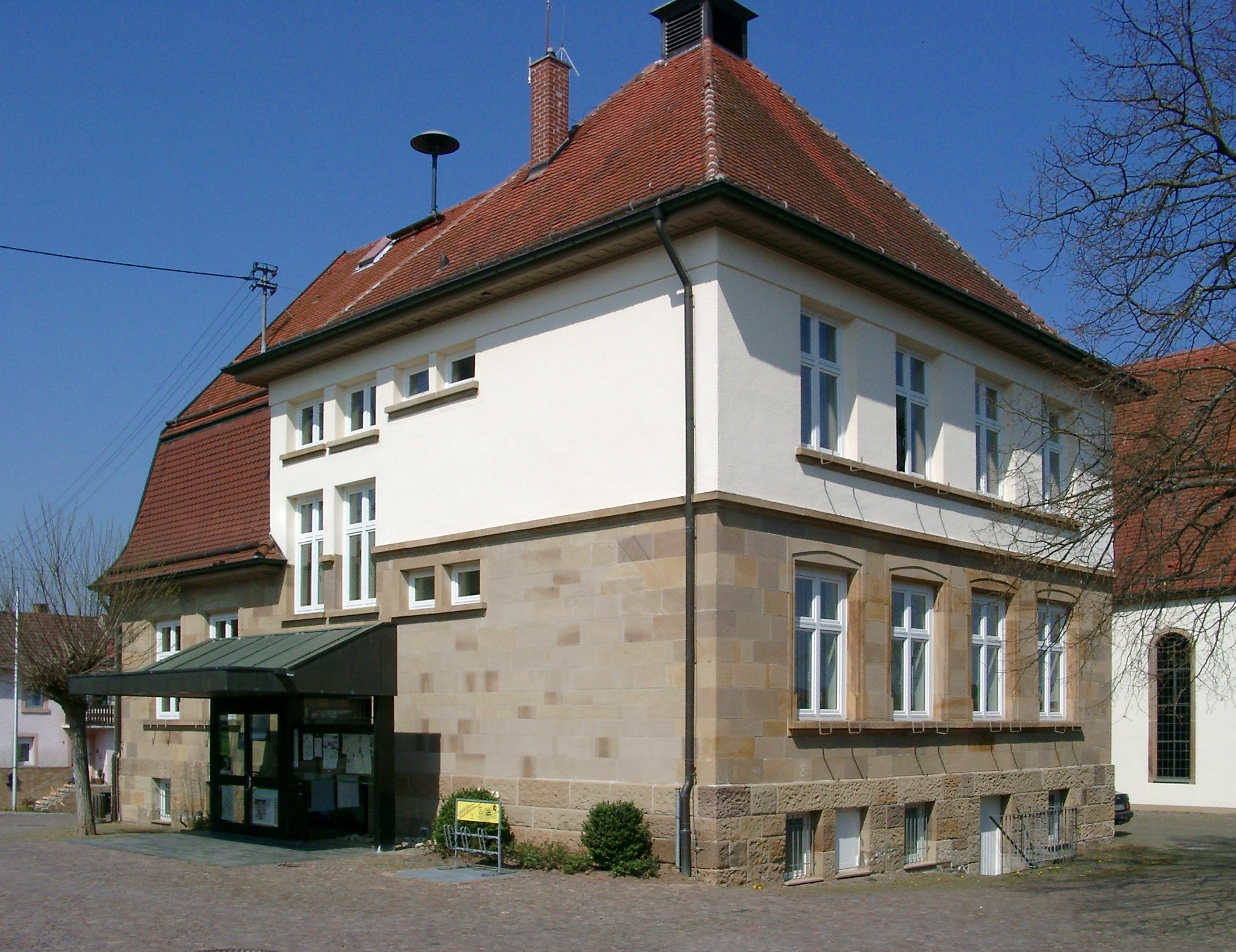
Zaberfeld Town Hall

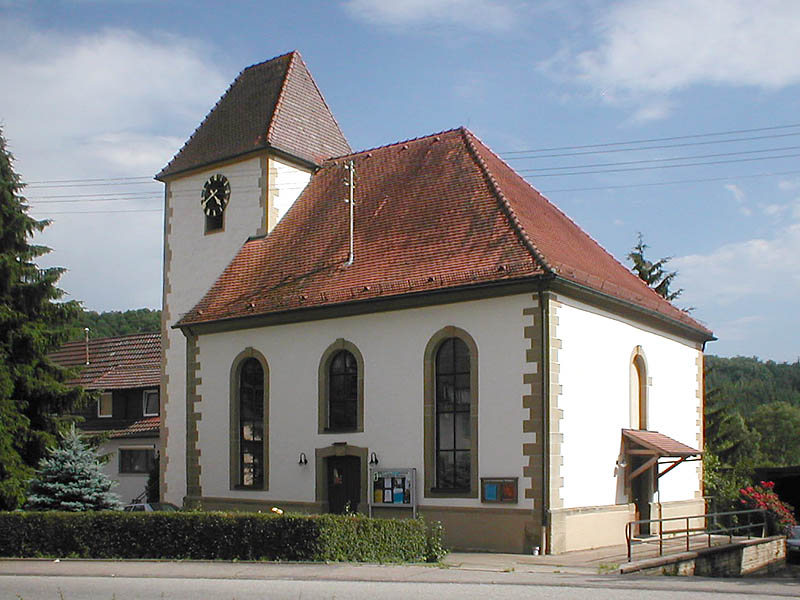
Church in Michelbach

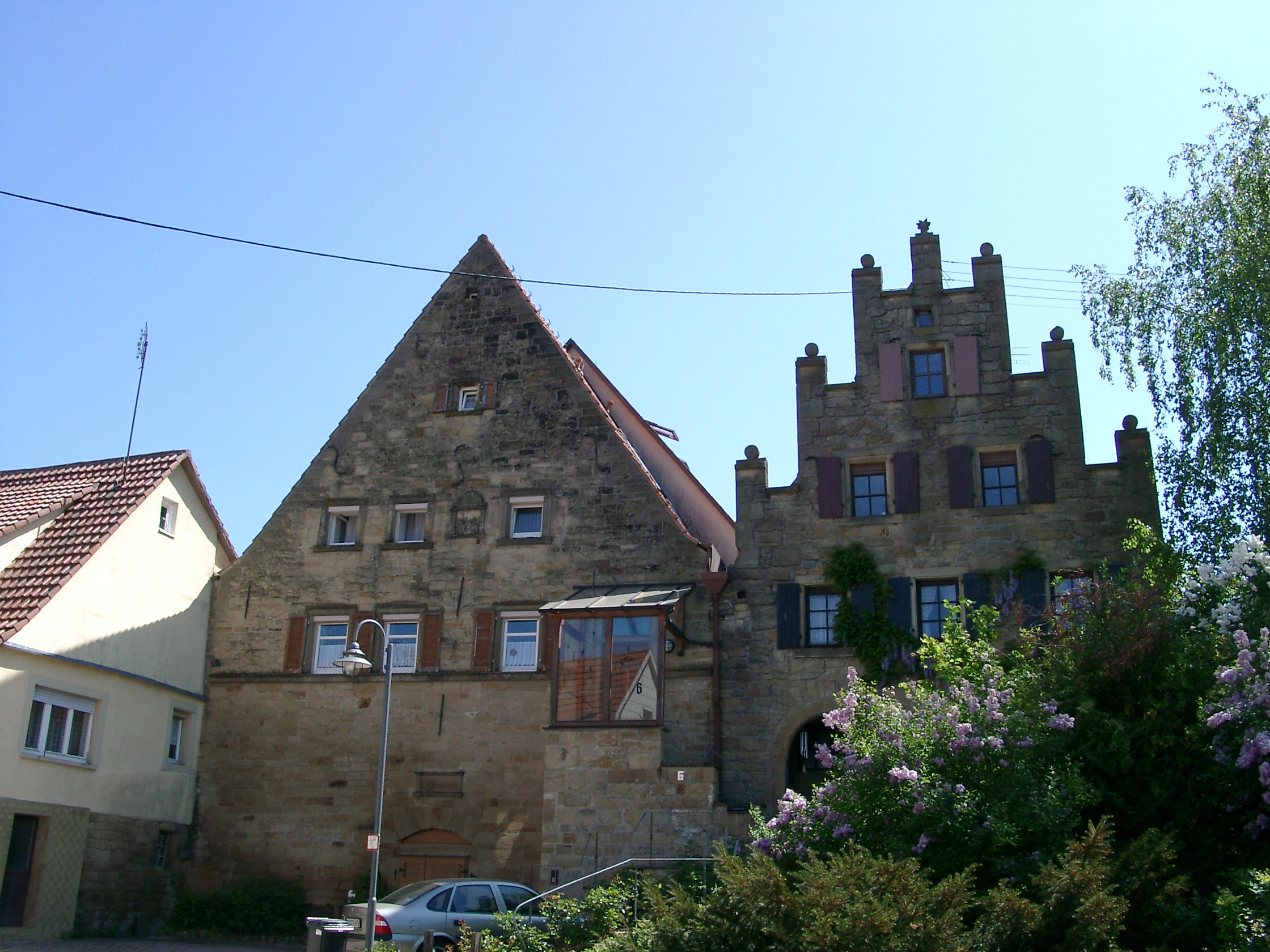
Historic Building in Ochsenburg
