= Leonbronn =

Village in Baden-Württemberg, Germany

Coordinates: 49°04′N 8°54′E

Leonbronn is a village in the district of Heilbronn in Baden-Württemberg, Germany. From 1971 to 1974, Leonbronn together with Ochsenburg formed the local authority of Burgbronn. The various districts of the latter were incorporated into the town of Zaberfeld on 1 January 1975.

Stromberg-Heuchelberg Nature Park still uses the Leonbronn name in the address.

The Zabergäu Railway was a spur line from the Franconia Railway. It ran for 20.3 km from Lauffen am Neckar to Leonbronn. It opened in 1896. The passenger service was discontinued on 25 July 1986 but goods trains, which carried mainly agricultural freight, continued to run until 25 September 1994. The route is officially closed.
