= Portuguese in France =

Ethnic group in France

Total population
- Total population of Portuguese born and ancestry 2,577,000 – 3,000,000 (2019); Residents of France born in Portugal; 644,206 Portuguese-born (2013 Census)

Regions with significant populations
- Ajaccio, Aquitaine, Brittany, Bordeaux, Cebazat (Clermont-Ferrand), Centre-Val de Loire, Corsica, Dax, Île-de-France, Languedoc-Roussillon, Lille, Limousin, Lower Normandy, Lyon, Marseille, Midi-Pyrénées, Montpellier, Nice, Northeastern France, Orléans, Paris, Pau, Pays de la Loire, Poitou-Charentes, Provence-Alpes-Côte d'Azur, Roubaix, Rouen, Strasbourg, Toulouse, Tours.

Languages
- French, Portuguese

Religion
- Roman Catholicism

Related ethnic groups
- Italian, Spaniards

Portuguese in France, also referred to as Luso-French, refers to people from Portugal who immigrated to or reside in France or French citizens of Portuguese descent. A common nickname among Portuguese people for their diaspora in France is aveques, from the French: avec, lit. 'with', though the term may be used in the reverse, that is, for Francophones living in Portugal, or for French people in general.

Portuguese immigration in France took place mainly during the 1960s and 1970s, to escape dictatorship and conscription, and to enable immigrants to find better living conditions. Portuguese migrants were sometimes referred as gens des baraques ("people from the barracks"). Most began working in construction.

== History ==
=== 15th–17th century ===
==== Portuguese Jews in France: the great immigration (1497–1600s ca.) ====
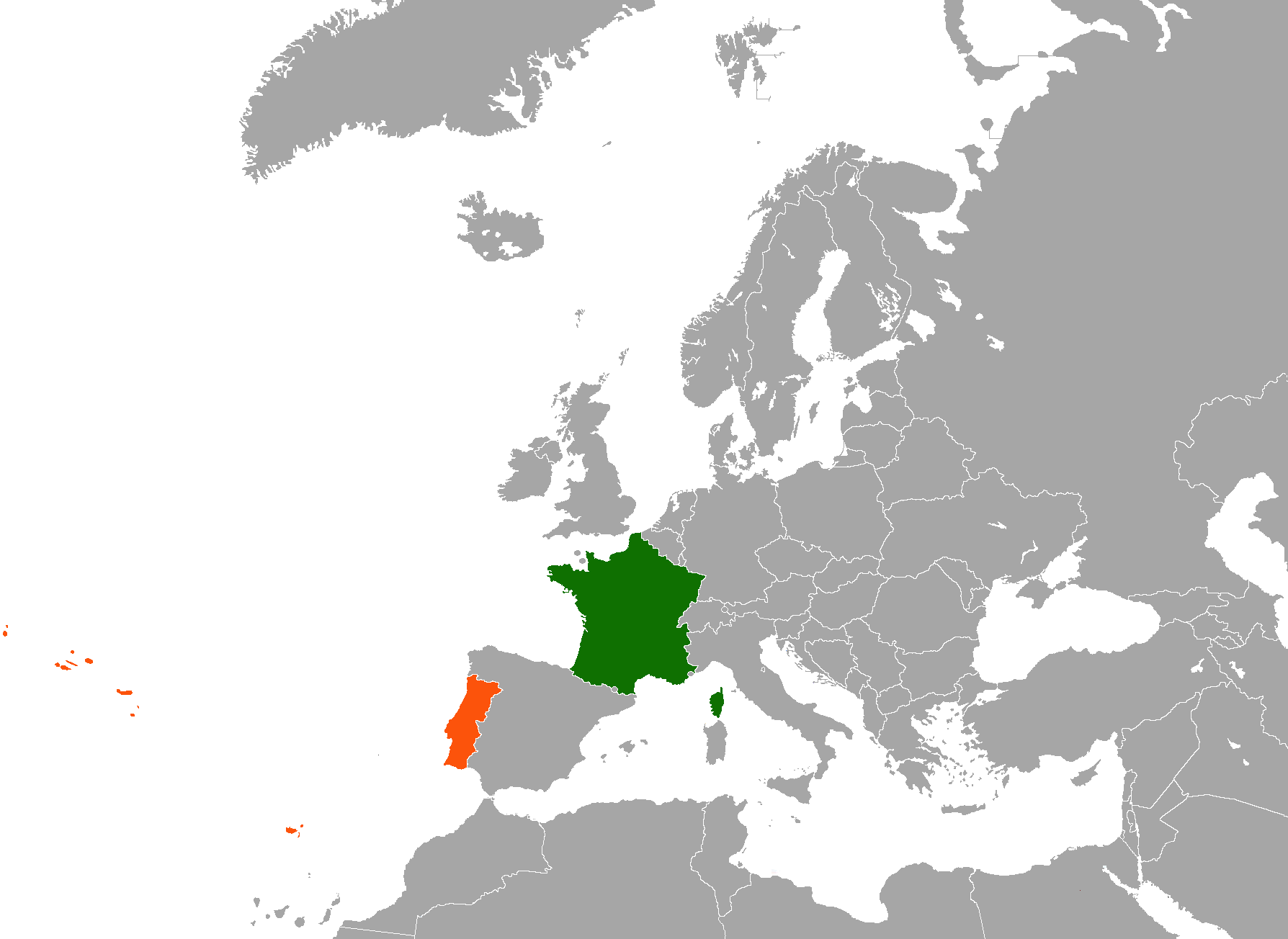
Map showing the countries' locations within Europe

Even though contacts between the two countries were established in the Antiquity and the first king of Portugal was of French descent, for many centuries migration routes remained rather unexplored.

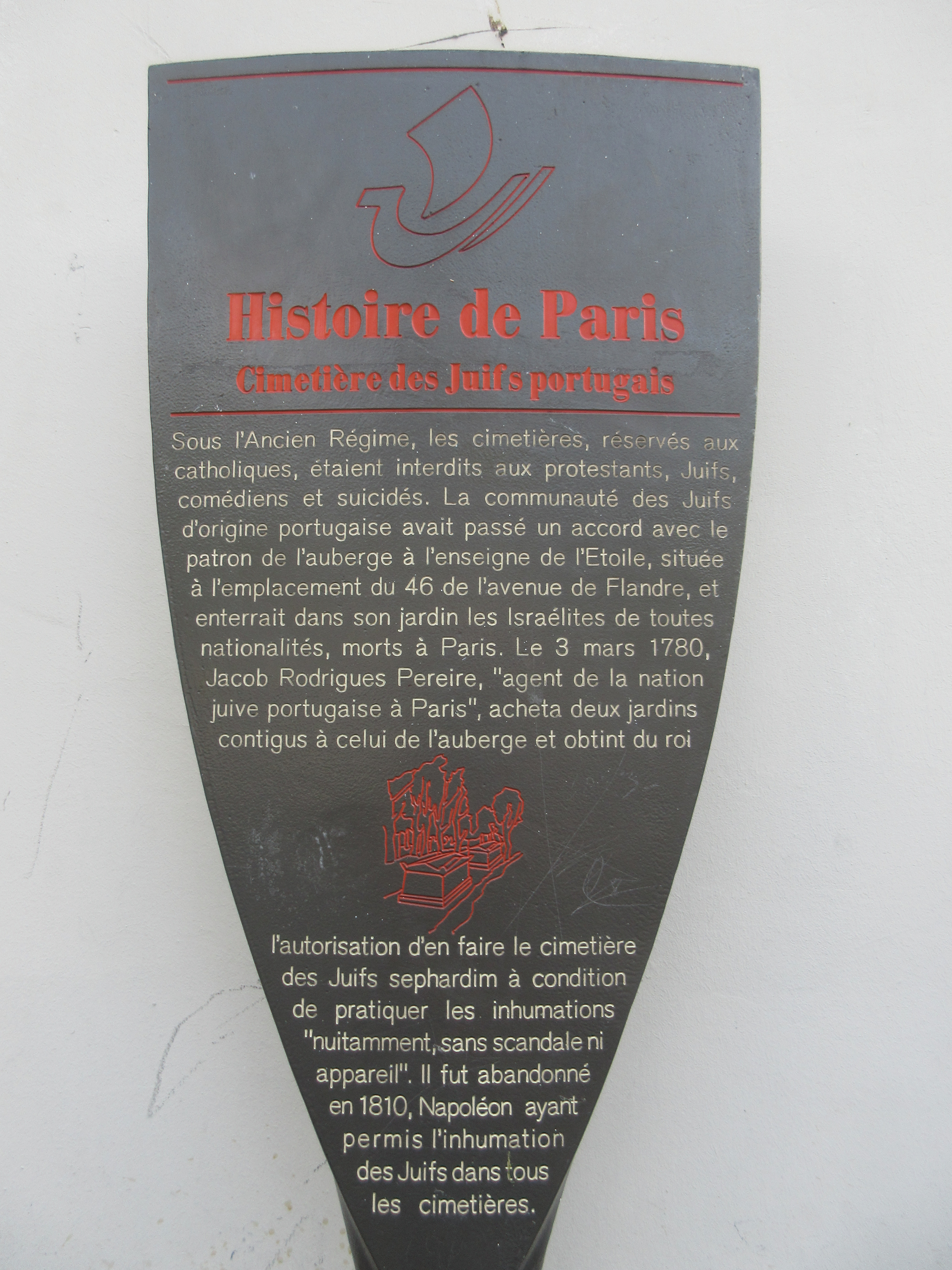
Portuguese-Jewish cemetery plaque in Paris

It is only in the 16th century that one of the first relevant influxes of Portuguese people coming to France was recorded. This immigration was partly a result of the expulsion decree issued in 1496 by the Portuguese monarchy, which targeted Jews and Moors living in Portugal. This decree forced many Jews to either convert to Christianity (leading to the emergence of Cristão-novos and of Crypto-Judaism practices) or leave the country, leading to a diaspora of Portuguese Jews throughout Europe, including France.

Starting from 1550 they were recognized rights previously reserved to French citizens only, thus encouraging further immigration. It is believed that up to 10,000 Portuguese-Jews might have migrated to France from 1497; this phenomenon remained noticeable up until the 1600s, when the Netherlands became a favourite choice.

As of consequence many Portuguese-Jews settled in the western provinces of France, most notably in Nouvelle-Aquitaine establishing communities in cities such as Biarritz, Bayonne, Bordeaux, La Rochelle and Nantes. In the latter alone, in 1590 100 people of Portuguese-Jewish descent naturalized.

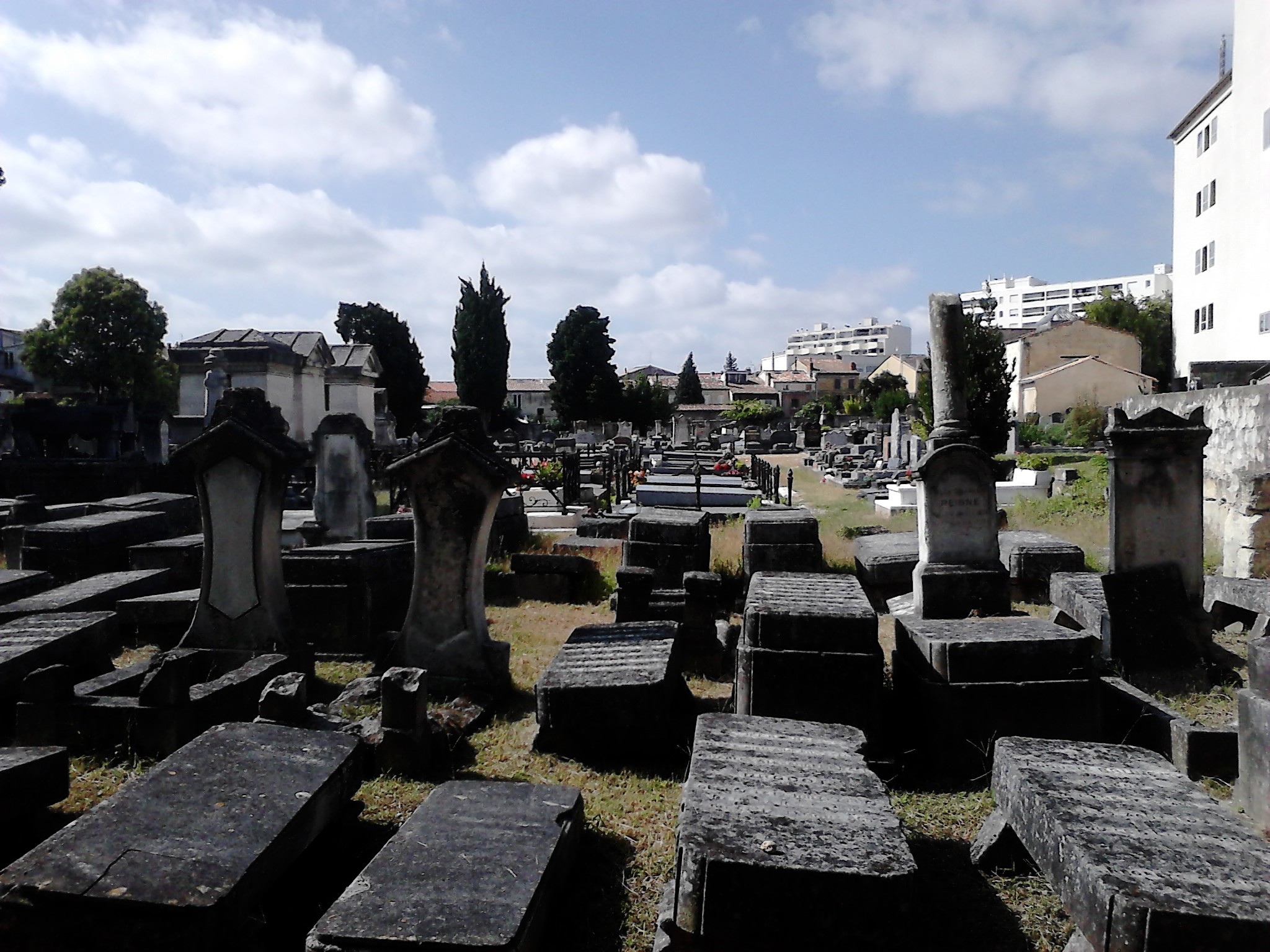
Portuguese-Jewish cemetery

Due to their origin, upon arrival in France they were often referred to as nouveaux chrétiens (new Christians) forming the Nation Portugaise (Portuguese nation). On the surface, they strictly adhered to all the practices of the Catholic religion, but at home many remained true to Judaism.

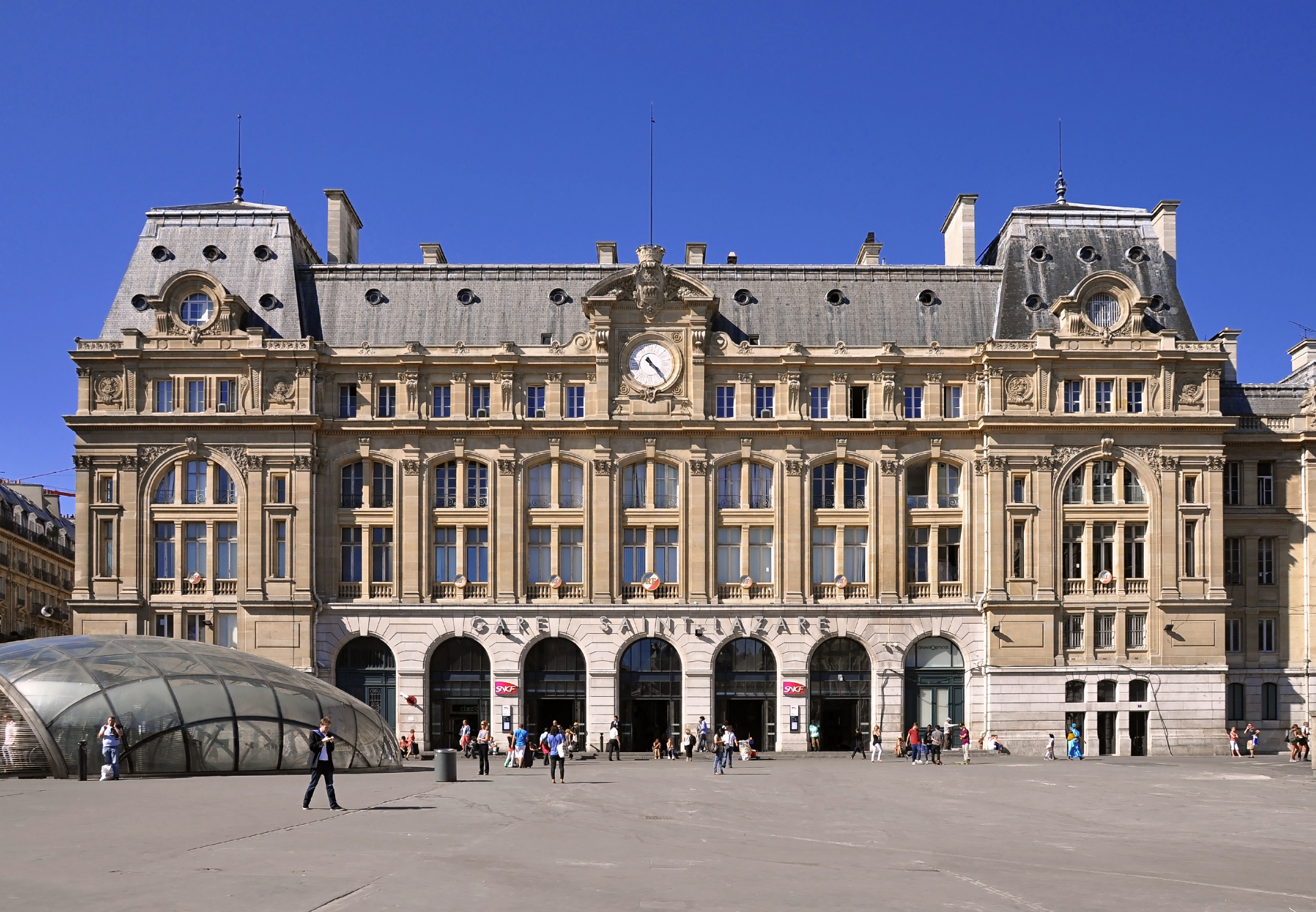
Gare Saint-Lazare in Paris, built by the Pereire brothers, of Portuguese-Jewish descent

At the beginning of the 17th century, some relaxed their observation of the Christian religion, and in the middle of the century, they stopped completely, returning openly to Judaism. They are then referred to as Juifs portugais (Portuguese Jews).

When the Jews, who had settled as new Christians in Bayonne or Bordeaux, fleeing the Spanish or Portuguese Inquisition, openly returned to Judaism, they began to celebrate services according to their original rite, which will be called mistakenly as a Rite portugais or Portuguese rite, when it has its source in Spain and many texts or prayers are said in Spanish. Unlike the Jews of Spanish origin who took refuge in Turkey, Greece and the Sephardic part of Bulgaria, who adopted Ladino (a sacred language, a mixture of Hebrew and Spanish) for their prayers, the Jews of Bayonne and Bordeaux never used it. Haïm Vidal Séphiha, professor emeritus and first holder of the chair of Judeo-Spanish at the Sorbonne, explains this difference by the proximity of Spain and the many commercial relations that the community maintained with this country.

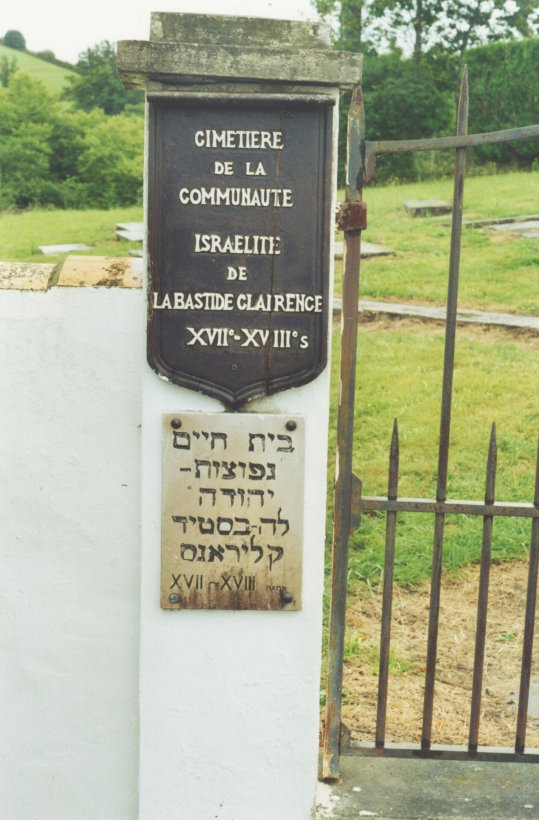
Portuguese-Jewish cemetery near Bordeaux

The Portuguese-Jewish community was very active in international trade, mainly with countries where other Jewish communities of Spanish or Portuguese origin were established.

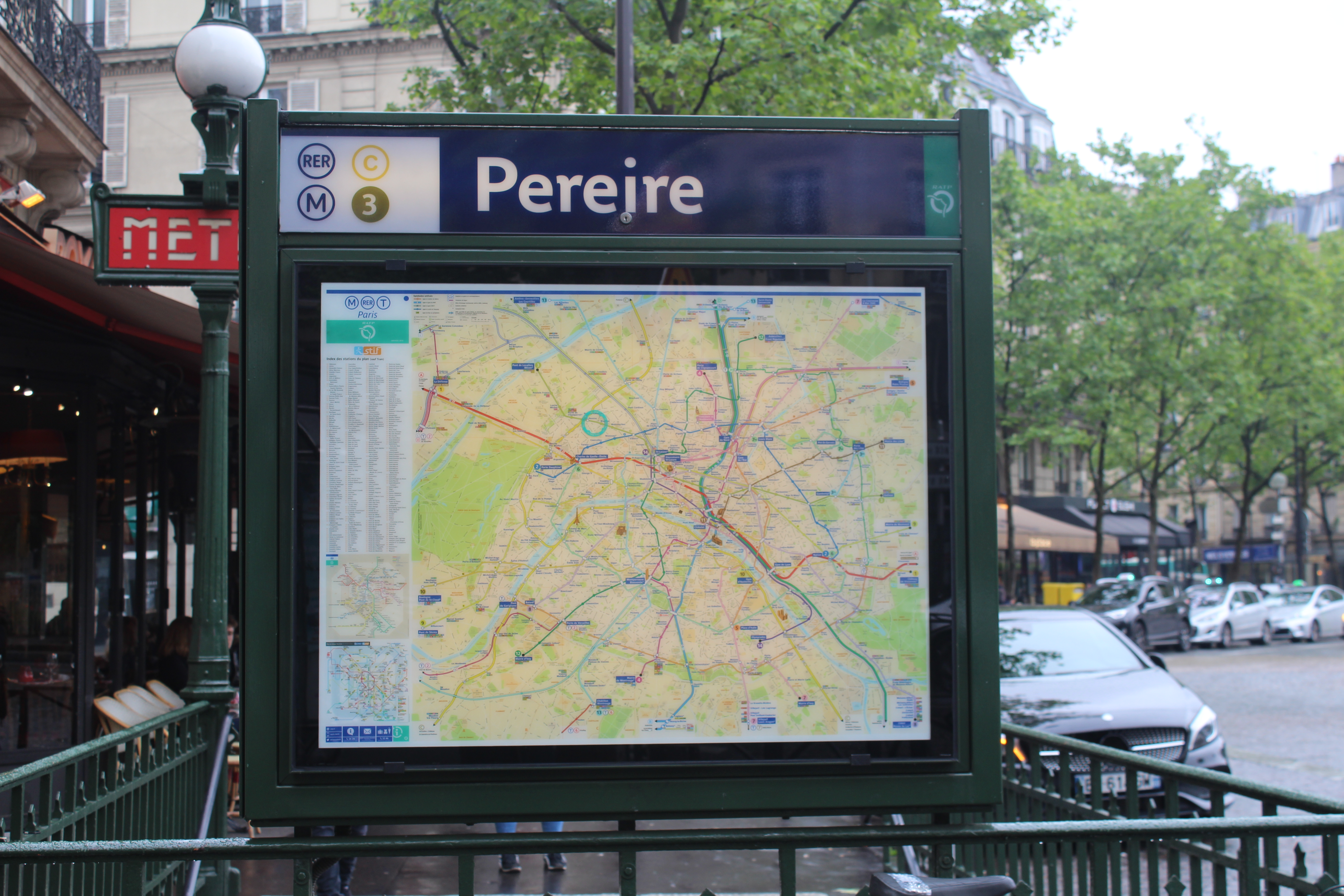
Pereire metro station in Paris, dedicated to notable members of the Pereire Family

Among others, trade is flourishing with the Caribbean, the Netherlands Antilles, Amsterdam and London. In particular, the Bayonne Jews introduced chocolate to France and made Bayonne the capitale du chocolat (chocolate capital) which it has remained. Among notable Portuguese-Jews or people of Portuguese-Jewish descent having lived or moved to France, it is noteworthy to remember personalities such as Abraham Espinoza, grandfather of the world-famous philosopher, Abraham Furtado, Henri Castro, Elias Legarde, Solomon de Medina and Marc Bédarride. In addition, the first Jew recorded to having set foot in Canada, Esther Brandeau as well as Jacob Rodrigues Pereira, one of the inventors of deaf-mutes sign language, both had Portuguese-Jewish roots.

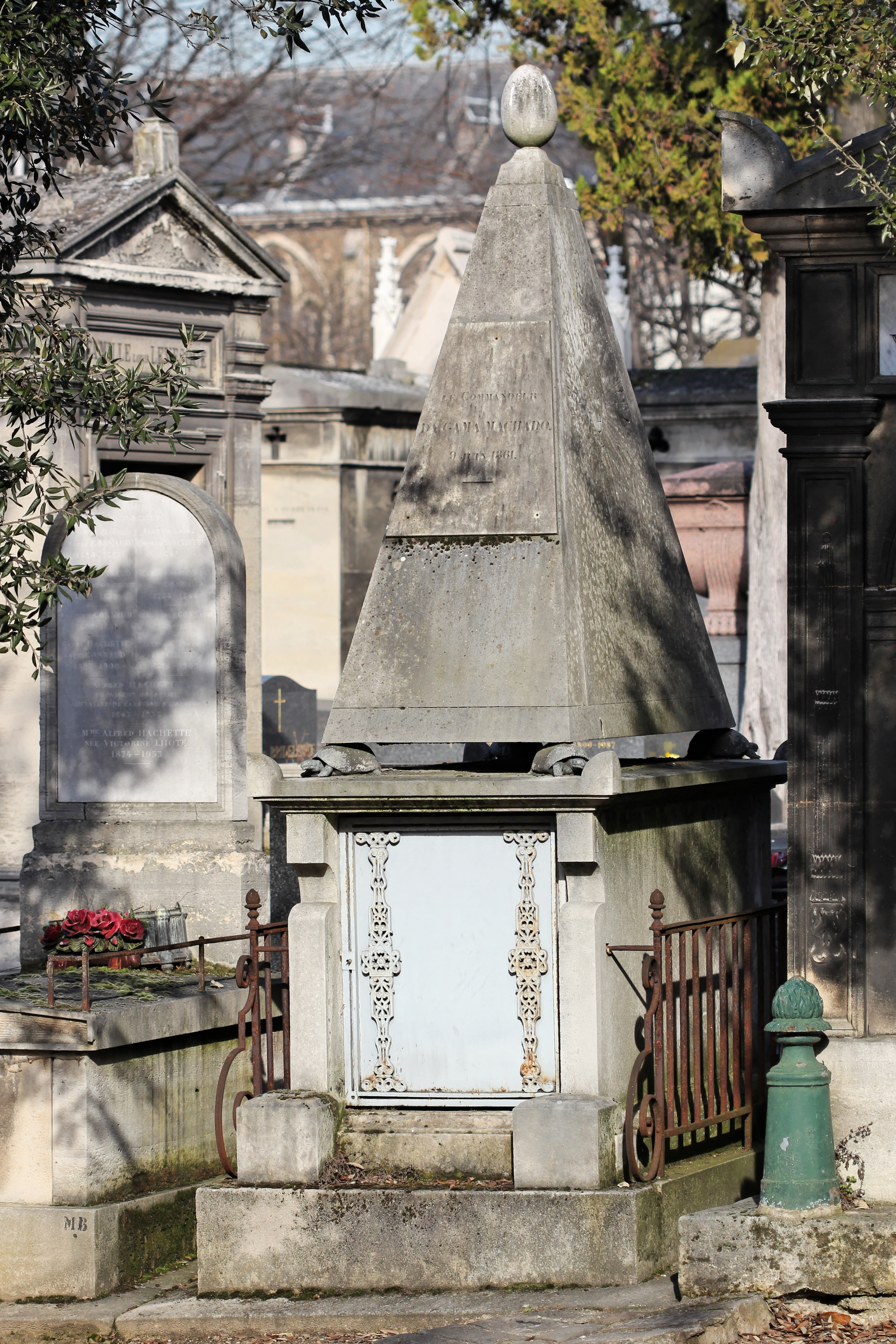
Grave of naturalist Jose-Joachim da Gama Machado (1775–1861), Pere-Lachaise Cemetery

Among other contributions Portuguese-Jews have made to France, one ought to mention the Pereire brothers (Émile Pereire and Isaac Pereire) were among the most influential entrepreneurs in the 19th century, Benjamin Olinde Rodrigues (famous for Rodrigues' rotation formula), Eugène Péreire (founder of Banque Transatlantique), Noémie de Rothschild (founder of Société Française des Hôtels de Montagne), Catulle Mèndes, Eugénie Foa, Jacob Émile Édouard Péreira Brandon, Pierre Mendès France, Daniel Iffla and Jules Carvallo (among the founders of the Alliance Israélite Universelle).

Notable Portuguese Jewish families in France include the Rodrigues-Henriques Family, the Pereire Family and the Gradis Family. In particular, the Gradis family founded in the 17th century the Maison Gradis, which became the Société française pour le commerce avec l'Outre-mer (SFCO), through which it played an important role in trade with the French possessions in America. At the end of the 18th century, they had such control over the connections between France and the Caribbean that Louis XVI offered to ennoble them, an offer they rejected because it would have required them to take an oath on the New Testament. In 1936, the Gradis were among the 200 wealthiest families in France.

=== 19th century ===
In the 19th century people from Portugal started emigrating again towards France. At the beginning the community was small and in the 1876 Census, the first mentioning the Portuguese, there were 1,237 members of the community. The growth of the community was slow, in a way that after the 1896 Census, numbering just 1,280 people, their numbers were discontinued from official French statistics.

=== 20th century ===
==== Portuguese expeditionary forces in France during the WWI ====
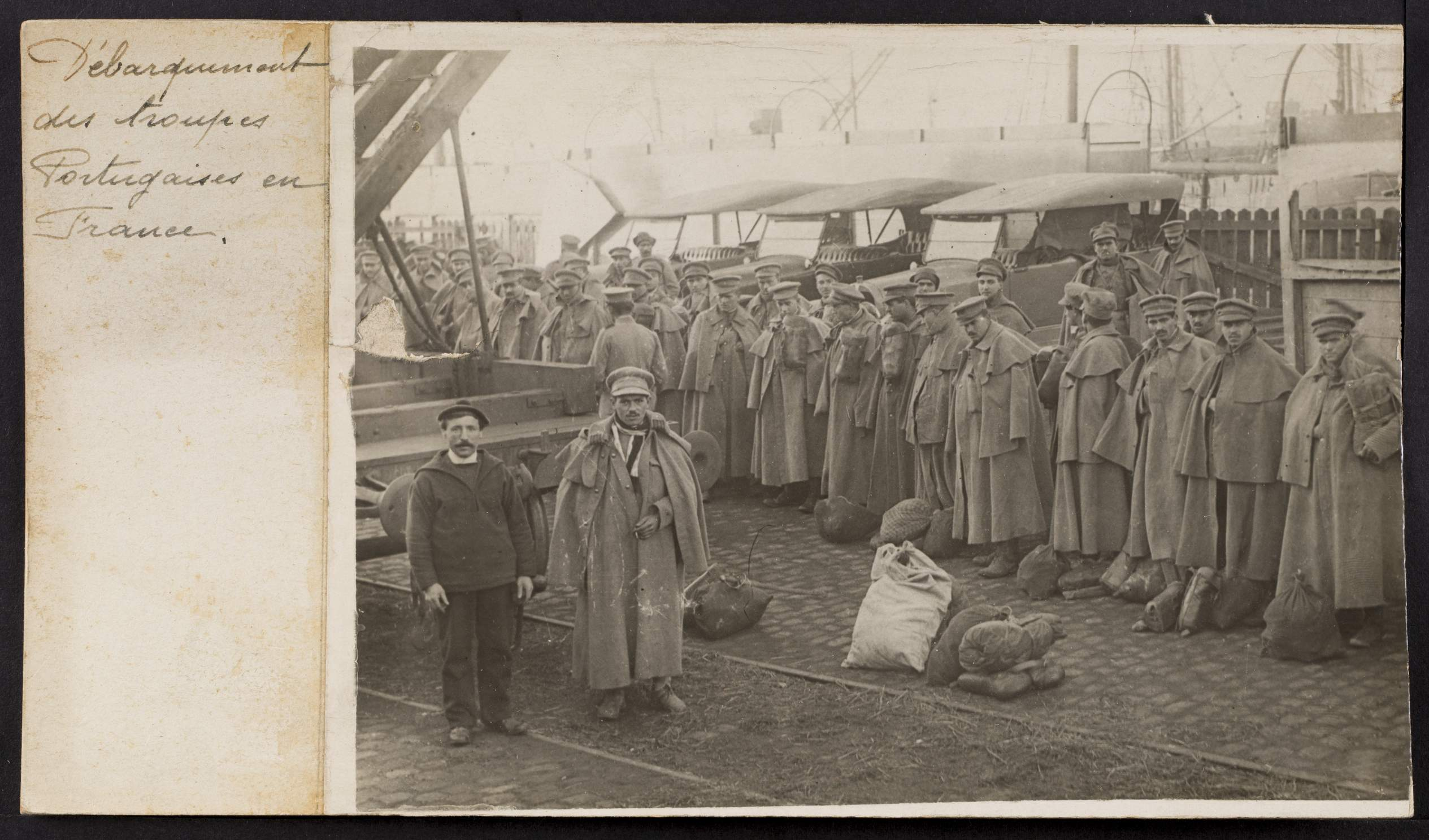
Disembarkment of Portuguese troops in France

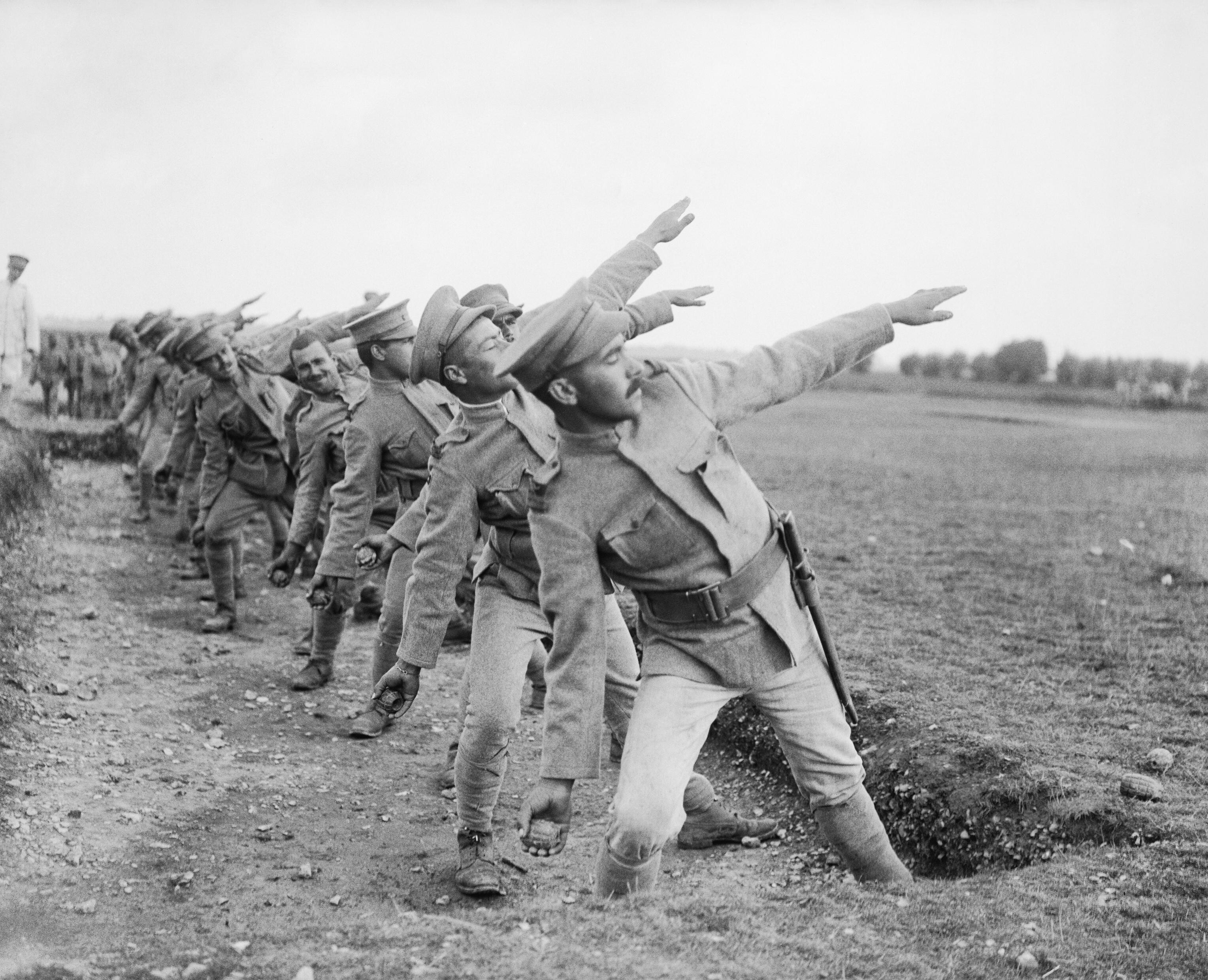
The Portuguese Expeditionary Corps on the Western Front, 1917–1918

In 1918, an avenue was named avenue des Portugais (Portuguese Avenue) in Paris' 16th arrondissement It was previously known as Avenue de Sofia (Sofia Avenue).

The name pays tribute to the expeditionary forces sent by Lisbon (which represented 80,000 men); the kingdom of Bulgaria then ally of Germany was thus "sanctioned": Sofia its capital thus seeing itself deprived of a Parisian route in its name. By order of 29 October 1971, a street in Sofia's honour (rue de Sofia or Sofia street)was restored to the 18th arrondissement.

With the expeditionary forces, some 22,000 Portuguese citizens came to France, among 600,000 foreign workers contracted for providing assistance to the nation's military efforts.

==== A community growing against all odds (1916–1957) ====
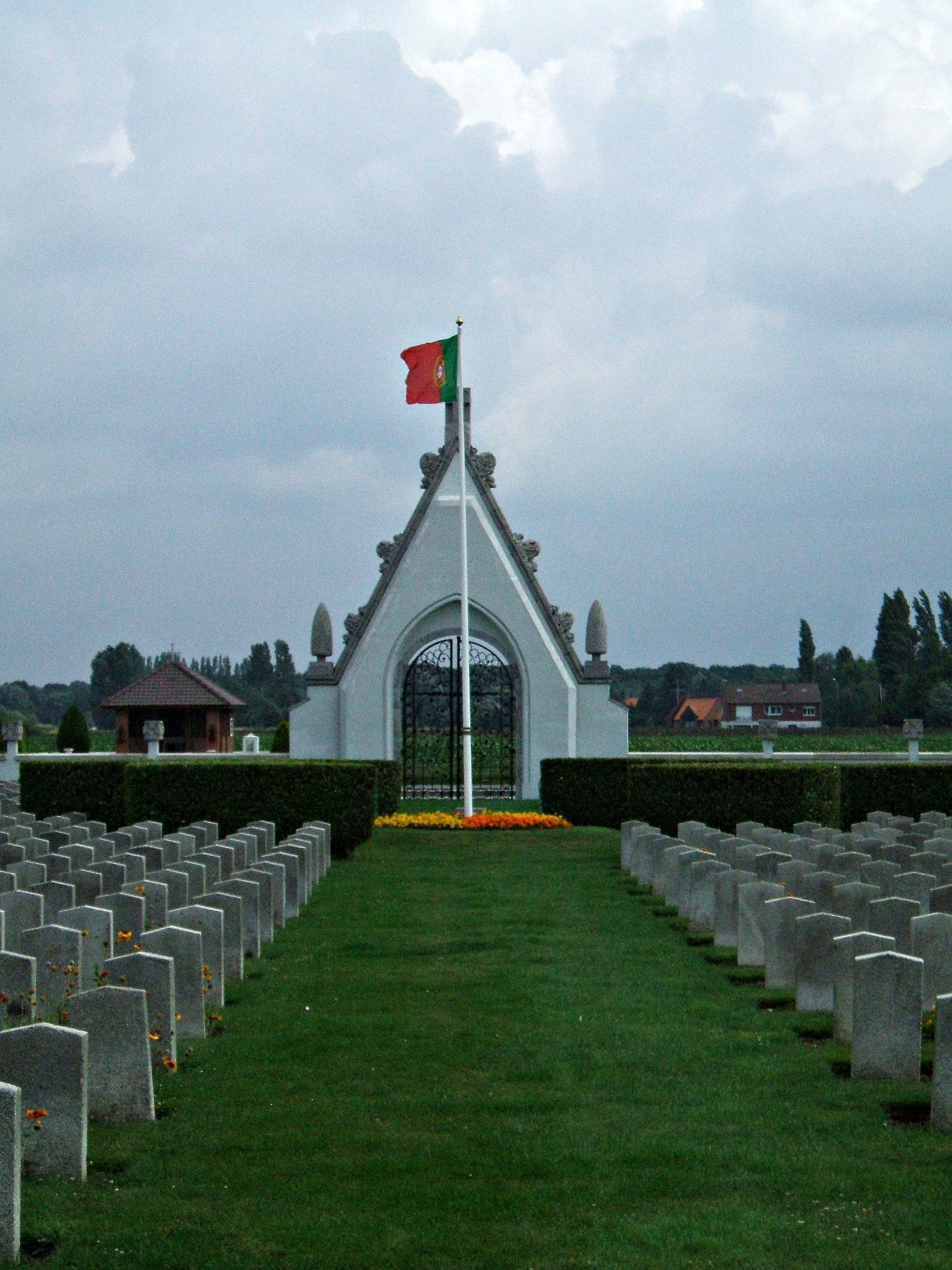
Portuguese WWI cemetery in Richebourg, hosting 1,831 Portuguese soldiers

Numbering about 22,000 after the WWI, the Portuguese became a relevant immigrant community in France. As the country was struggling with reconstruction efforts after the conflict, the French authorities aimed to maintain the presence of Portuguese individuals in France. Despite France's requests in 1918 and 1919 to reach an agreement with the Portuguese government, no resolution was achieved.

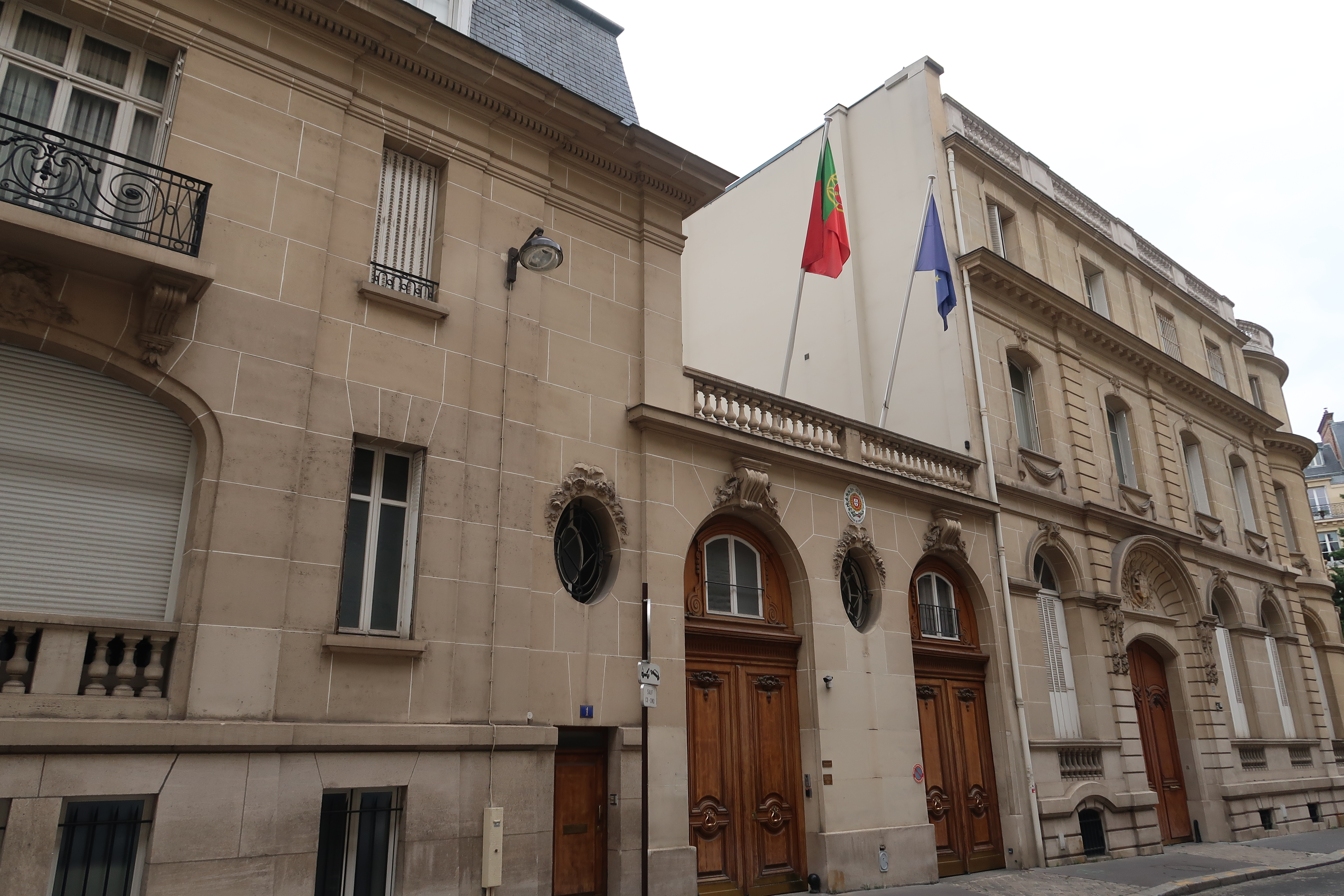
Portuguese embassy in Paris

However, as France successfully established agreements with other nations such as Belgium, Czechoslovakia, Italy and Poland the inability to reach an agreement with Portugal had limited effects. Additionally, the absence of an agreement did not hinder Portuguese workers from immigrating to France through illegal means. Consequently, the Portuguese community reemerged in the 1931 census with a population of 49,000, predominantly male, and primarily employed in the industrial sector.

The 1930s economic crisis had severe consequences for Portuguese migrants, with French governments implementing laws and measures to prevent the arrival of new immigrants and to exclude foreign workers deemed undesirable. Many Portuguese were deported once they became jobless. Philippe Rygiel's research on Cher reveals that Portuguese were the most heavily impacted by expulsions and non-renewal of worker's identity cards.

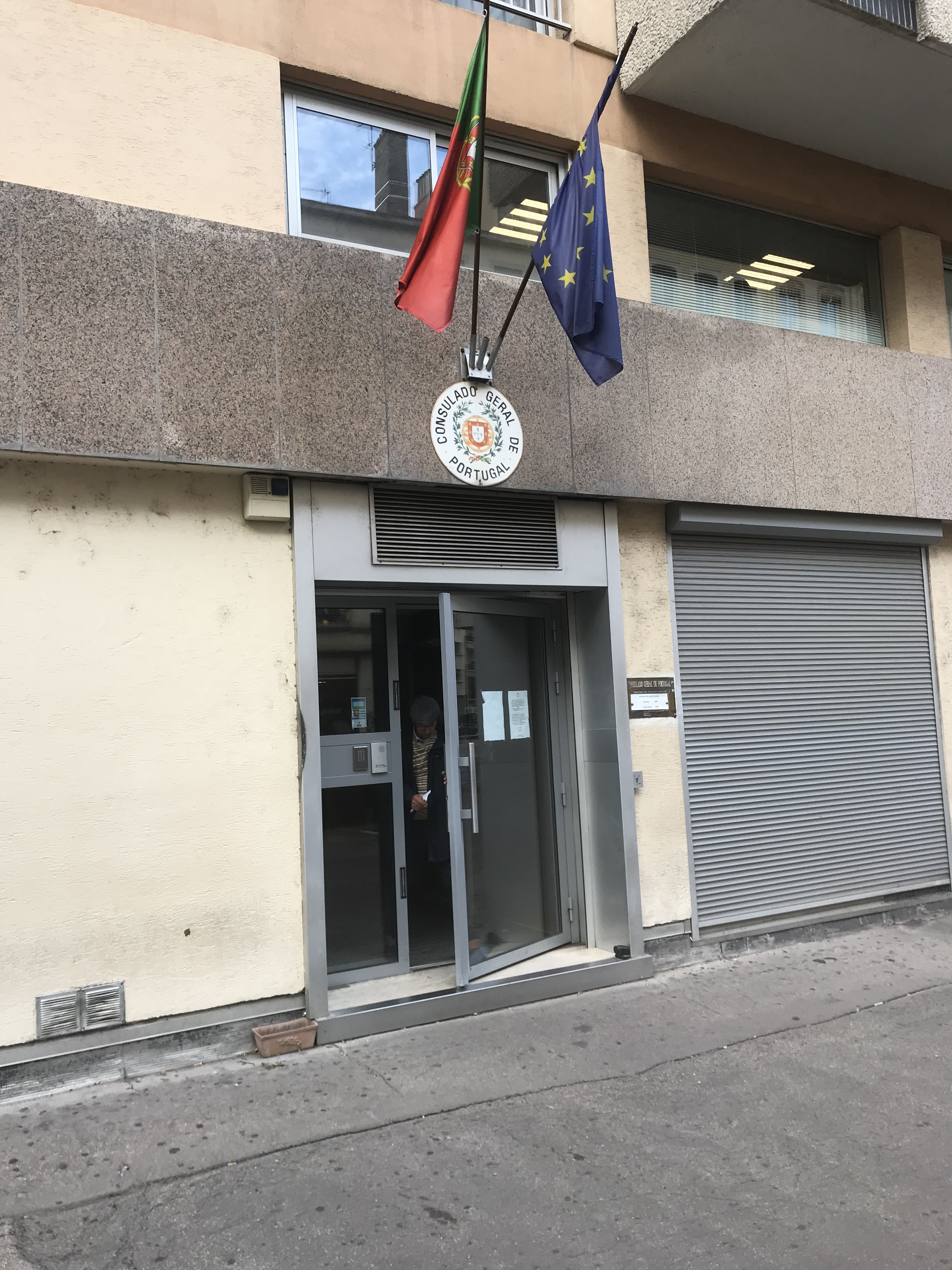
Portuguese consulate in Lyon

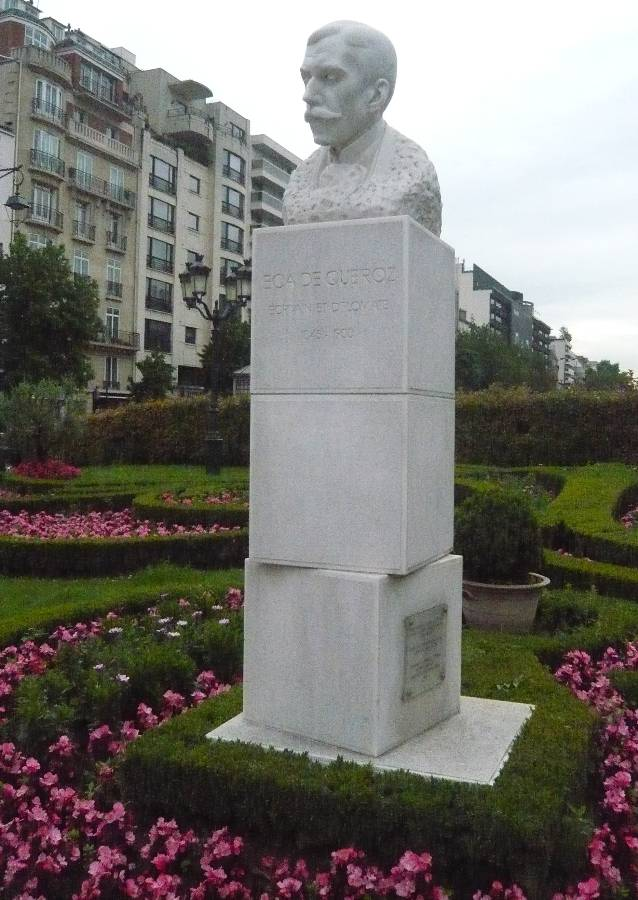
Eça de Queiroz statue in Neuilly-sur-Seine

As newcomers with limited French language proficiency, insufficient social capital, and with their state of origin refusing to sign any agreement with France, the Portuguese were the primary targets of a strict administration, claiming to defend national workers. Throughout the 1930s, the Portuguese population decreased considerably due to naturalizations, voluntary returns, expulsions, and deaths. By 1936, only 28,290 Portuguese remained in France.

In 1945, after WWII France hosted only a small number of Portuguese residents. Despite the French government's request to enforce the 1940 labor agreement, the Lisbon authorities declined, citing the need to retain their labor force. Agricultural landowners with substantial influence opposed the emigration of their people. Additionally, the Portuguese dictatorship was concerned about the return of its workers with liberal or even communist ideas, according to the French ambassador to Portugal. Hence, the Portuguese authorities refused to cooperate with the National Immigration Office and even banned emigration to France in 1955.

During the late 1940s and early 1950s illegal departures to France were scarce, with only a few hundred per year. Typically, those who left for France had relatives who had already migrated before the war or who had voluntarily or involuntarily left France and returned. For instance, António P. was detained in 1953 at the Franco-Spanish border while entering France illegally. Born near Longwy in 1928, his parents had returned to Portugal in 1939–1940, and one of his brothers had served in Indochina.

==== Great Portuguese emigration (1957–1974) ====
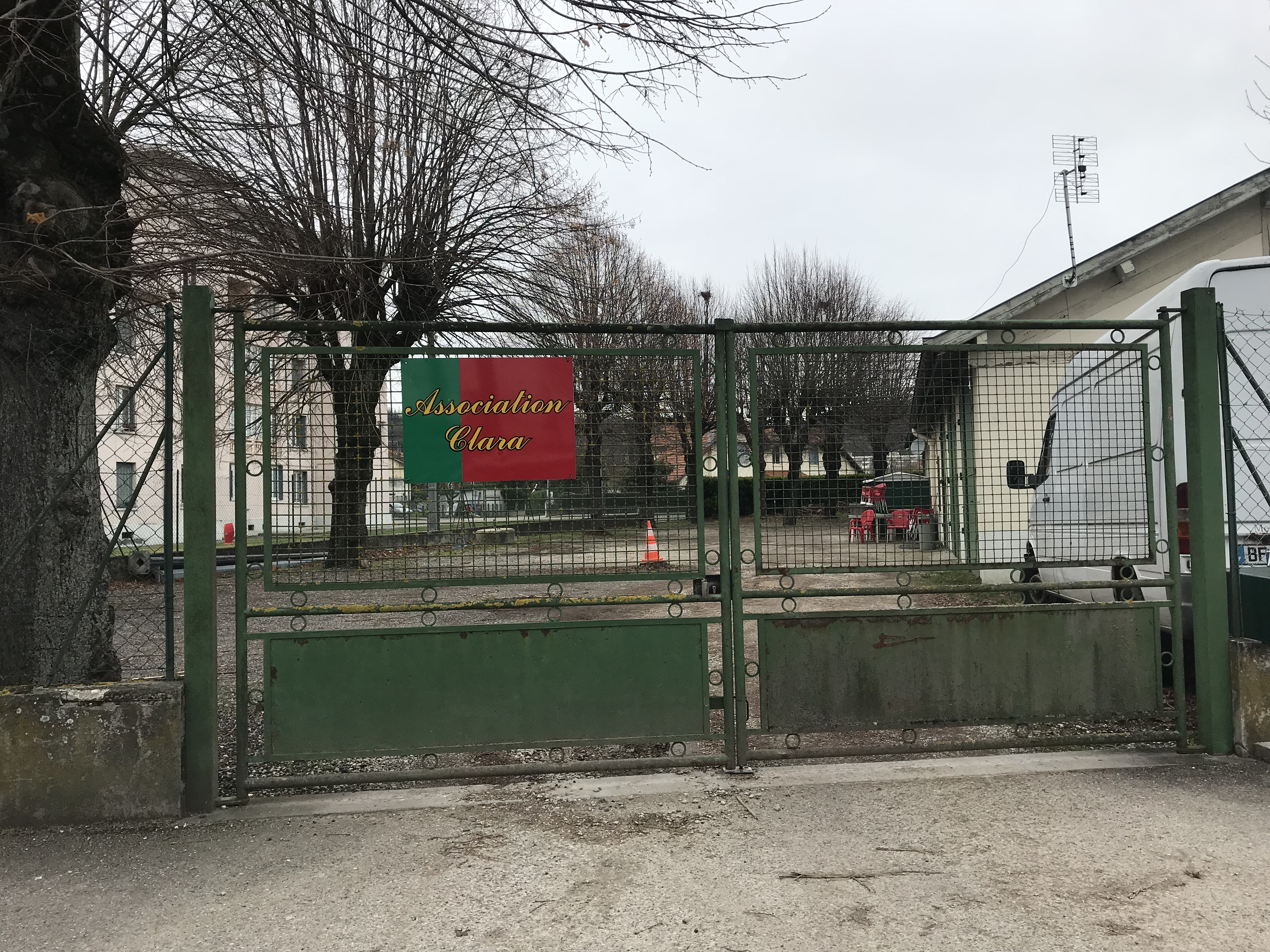
Portuguese association in Saint-Maurice-de-Beynost, Ain department, Auvergne-Rhône-Alpes region

From the 1960s, the political instability in Brazil, a traditional destination, and the measures taken by France to attract Portuguese workers gave an exceptional scale to Portuguese immigration to France.

In the mid-1950s, Portuguese moved to France in significant numbers to escape António de Oliveira Salazar's dictatorship. Between 1957 and 1974 some 900,000 Portuguese citizens sought refuge in France, mostly workers from the peasantry and young people refusing to be enrolled in the army for the colonial wars. Deserters were also very well received in Algeria and in the Scandinavian countries.

Leaders of the opposition to the dictatorship of António de Oliveira Salazar, notable communists, also found refuge in France to escape arrest. Most of the leaders of the Portuguese Communist Party were, however, banned from entering and staying in France, forcing them into hiding.

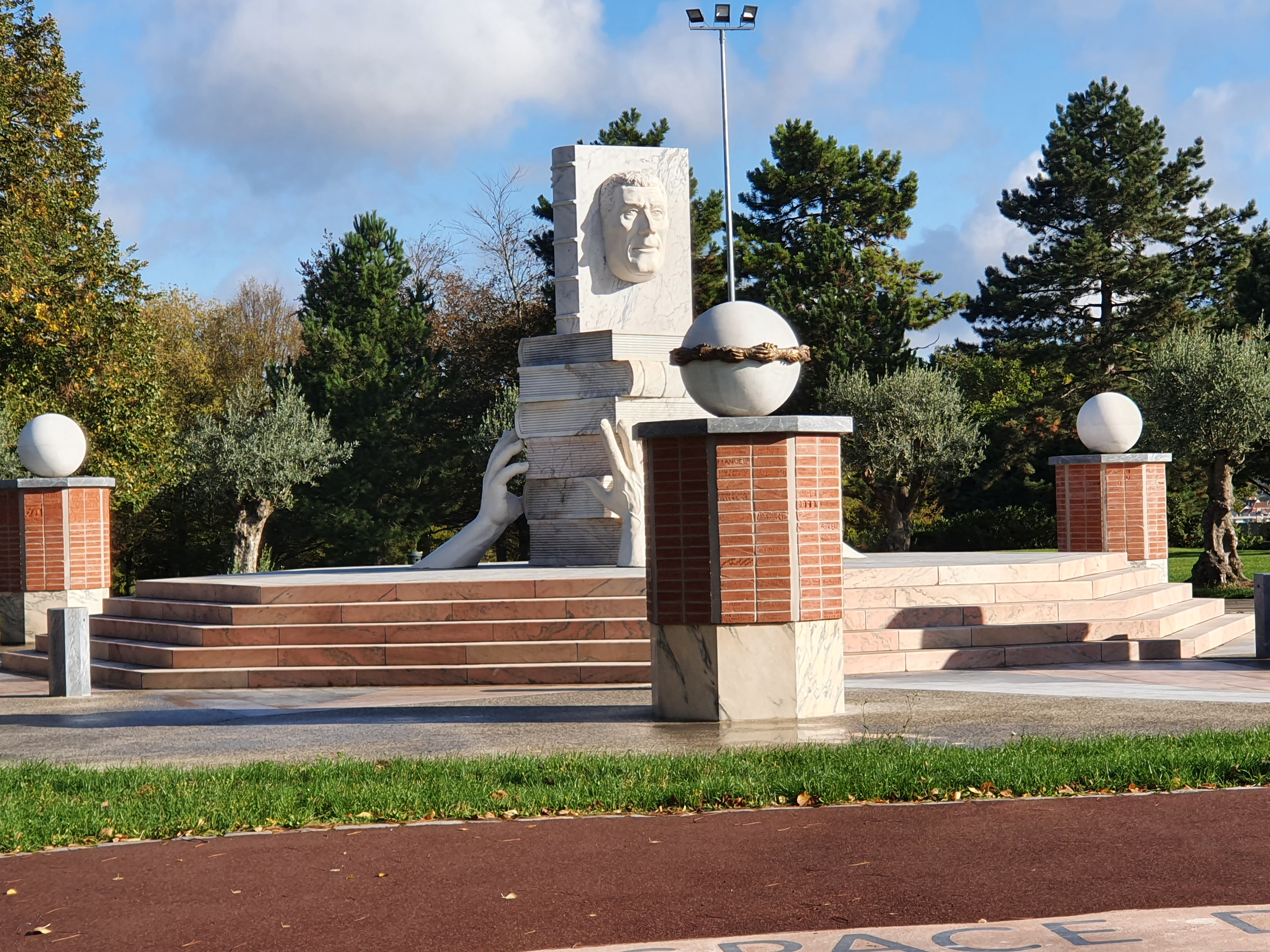
Monument to the Portuguese community in Champigny-sur-Marne

During this period the Portuguese rapidly became the largest foreign community in France. The numbers skyrocketed and the community already numbered 700,000 members in 1970. Fleeing misery most of the Portuguese emigrants found unfavourable conditions upon arriving in France. For instance, it were mostly the Portuguese, who developed and inhabited what is supposed to be the largest bidonville (or slum) ever emerged in France: up to 20,000 people lived in miserable conditions in Champigny-sur-Marne, on the outskirts of Paris. Many of the immigrants in fact settled in slums in the Paris region, in unhealthy conditions of extreme poverty. Most of these people were illiterate, peasants and villagers who employed themselves as unskilled laborers, cleaners or garbage collectors.

The majority of the emigrants settled in the Parisian banlieue, but, as time went by, many also resettled to other regions such as Corsica or Normandy.

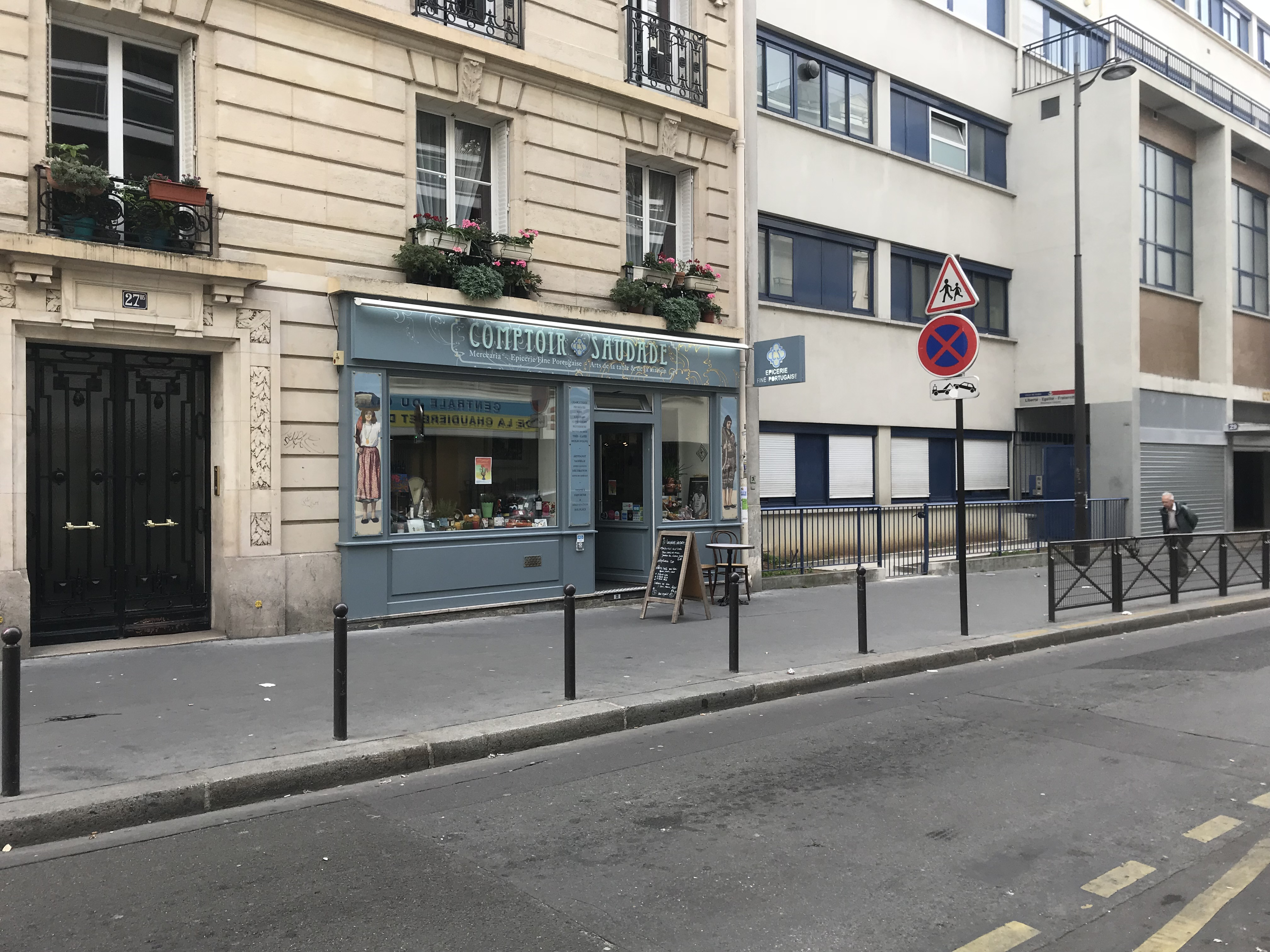
Portuguese business in Paris

The phenomenon reached its peak in 1970, when in a single year 135,667 Portuguese left their homes for France. The French media tended to portray these immigrants as individuals with limited cultural knowledge and no political affiliation, typically associated with low-skilled jobs. Women are frequently depicted as gatekeepers, and men are often depicted as construction workers, perpetuating a stereotypical image that does not accurately reflect the diversity of their professions and skills.

From 1973, with the economic crisis ending the Trente Glorieuses (or thirty glorious years), the end of the dictatorship, the instauration of democracy and the end of the Colonial war, emigration to France fell sharply in the following decades.

==== Stable emigration (1975–2000) ====
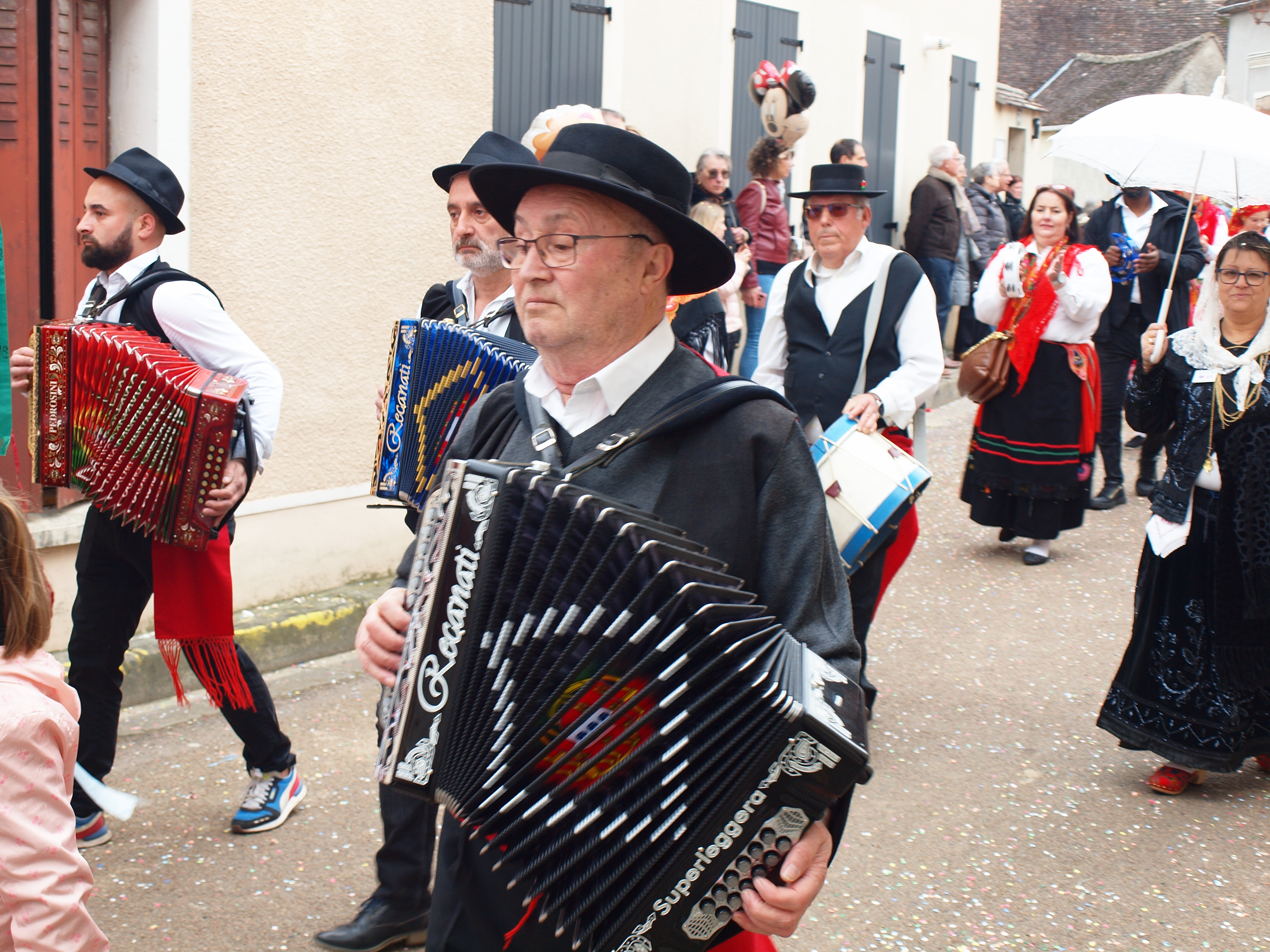
Portuguese band in Bourgogne

Following the improvement of economic conditions in Portugal, there was a decrease in the number of Portuguese emigrants leaving their home country in search of better opportunities in France. This could be attributed to a decrease in economic hardship and an increase in job opportunities in Portugal, reducing the push factors driving emigration. Additionally, improved economic conditions may have resulted in more favorable living conditions, further reducing the incentive for Portuguese citizens to leave their homeland. It is in this period that Portuguese people started growing roots in France, acquiring French citizenship, and integrating into society, reaching positions before unimaginable and starting to speak French.

Between 1980 and 1999, 73,384 Portuguese emigrated to France, a country that nevertheless remained the favourite destination for emigration, even though Switzerland, Germany and the UK started attracting many Portuguese immigrants during this period as well.

==== A new "boom" (2000–2012) ====
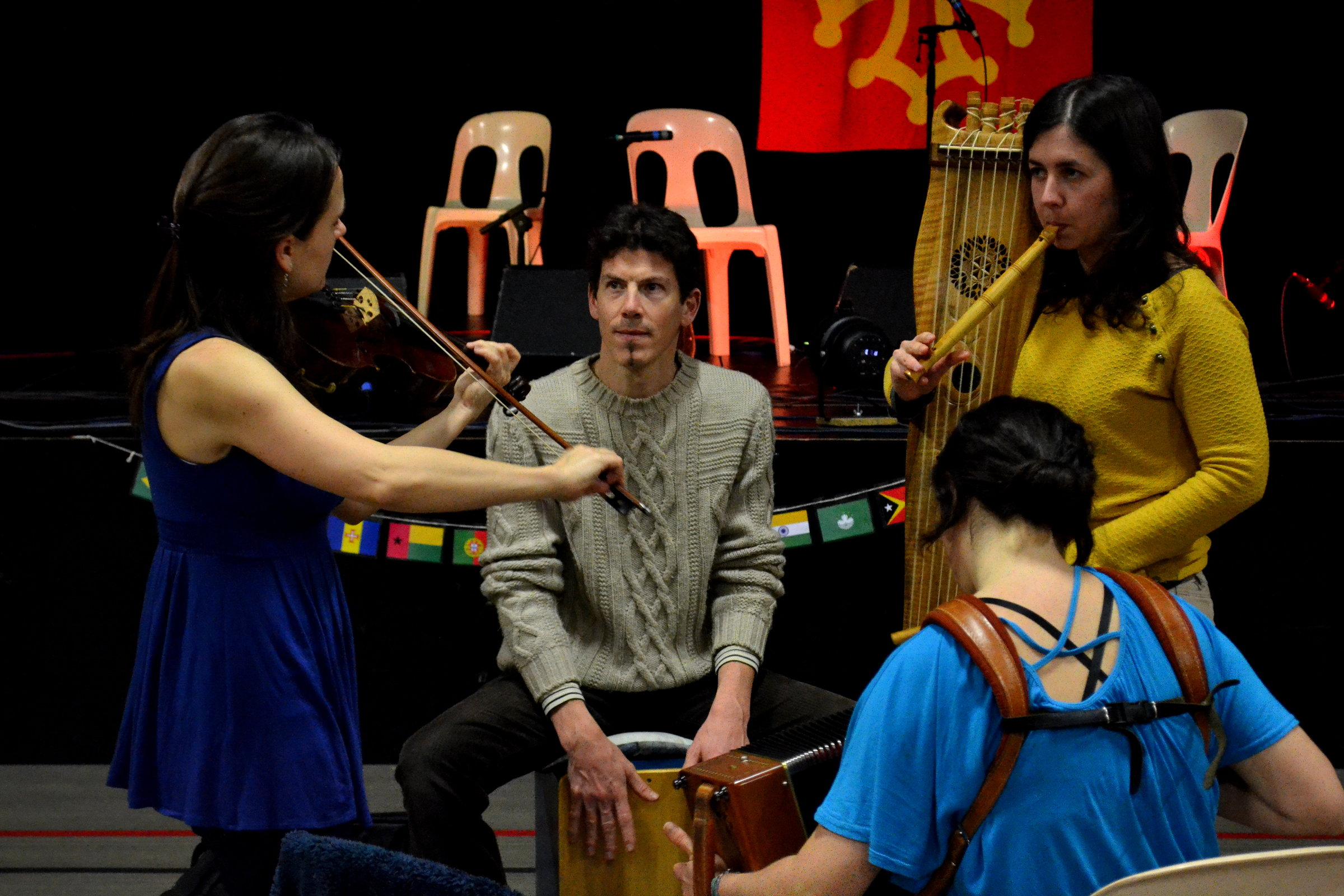
Portuguese event in Lons

With the introduction of the euro and the easing of movement throughout the EU, Portuguese national's interest towards France was renewed. From 2003 to 2012 approximately 120,000 Portuguese settled in France. The numbers soared after the 2008 recession that has greatly influenced Portugal (where the unemployment rate skyrocketed to 17.1%) in a way that some started referring to a "new boom" in emigration. As UK started gaining more attention in Portugal (where English had become the first foreign language, overtaking a position previously held by French) and as the economic conditions in Portugal become more favourable, the numbers soon dropped.

The community is now highly integrated: between 2000 and 2012 over 102,000 Portuguese acquired French citizenship, thus accounting for approximately 5.7% of the citizenship granted during this period.

==== An integrated community (2013–present) ====
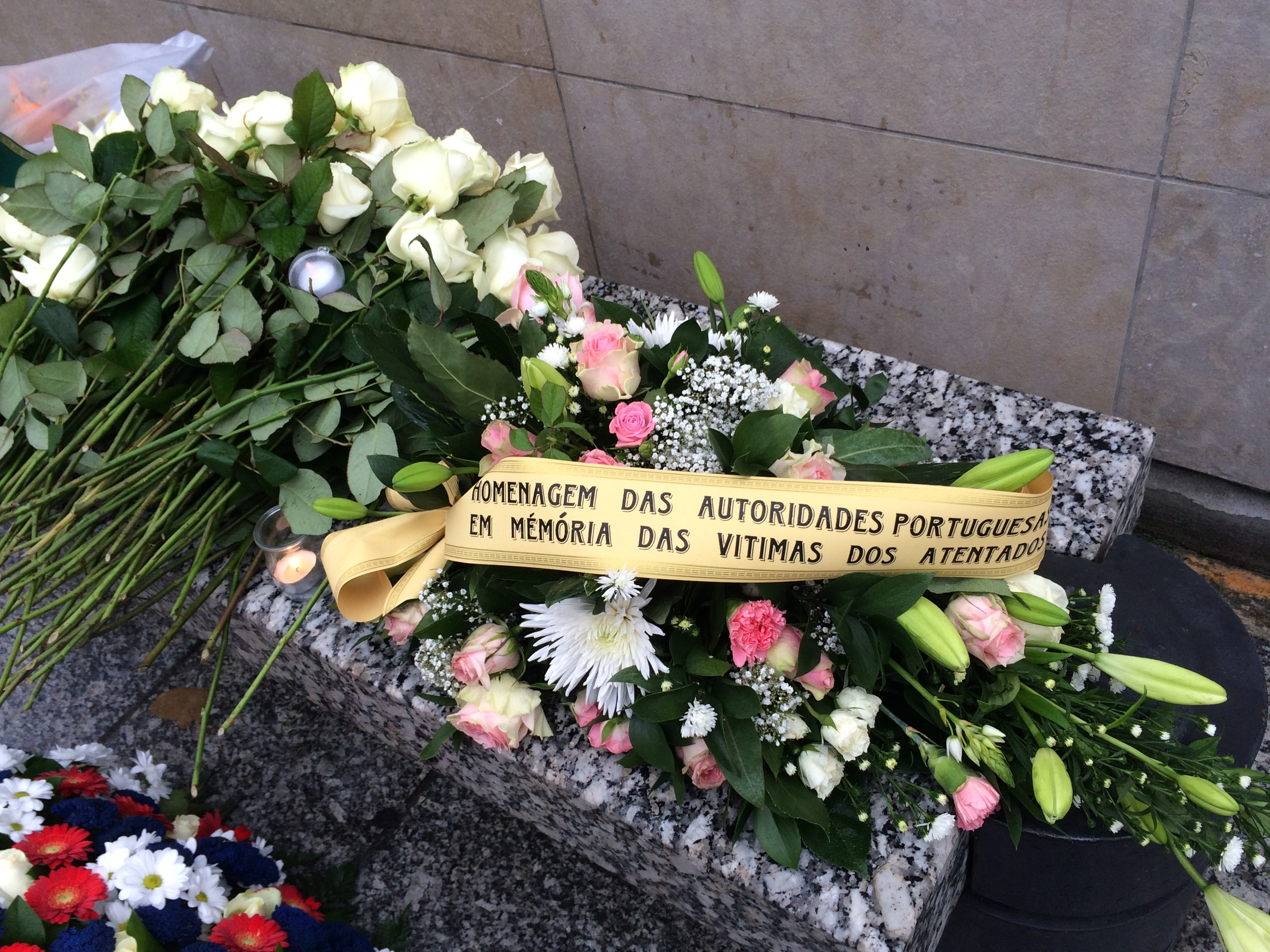
Wreath from Portugal in tribute to Manuel Dias and to the other victims of the attacks of 13 November 2015 near the Stade de France.

As the majority of the Portuguese in France are now French citizens and the community has achieved greater stability, their image in the country is more positive. The Luso-French, nevertheless, didn't forget their country of origin and between 2018 and 2022 the community sent approximately 5.4 billion€ to Portugal in remittances, thus confirming the prime role France has always had in sending remittances to Portugal, helping the country's growth and sustaining the family members living there.

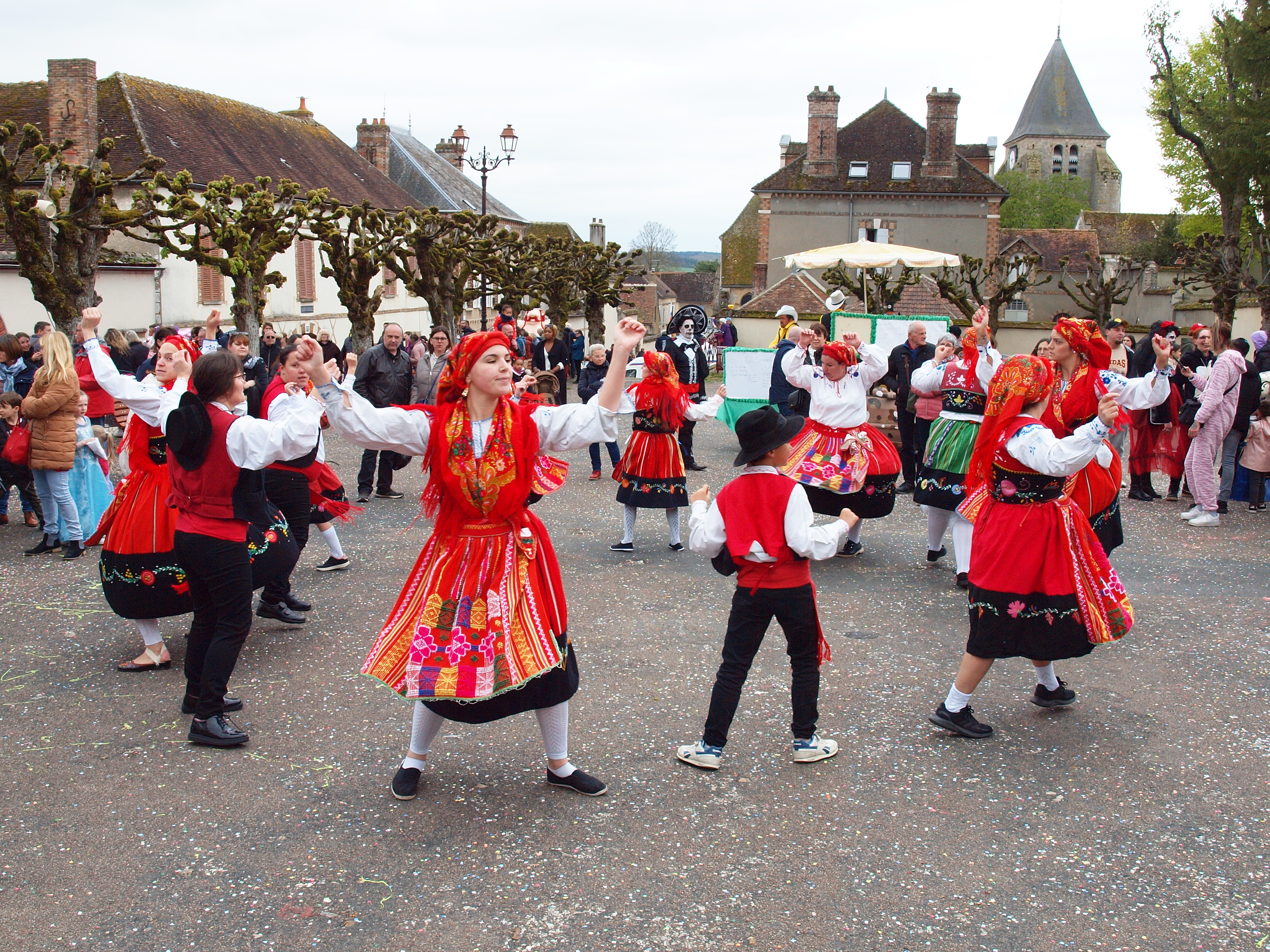
Portuguese Carnival in Sergines

The migratory movement from Portugal to France remains quite strong, as between 2013 and 2020 a little over 87,500 Portuguese emigrated to France and, with approximately 22,000 acquisitions of French citizenship, the Portuguese remain among the communities with the highest integration rate.

Today there are around 1,000,000 people with dual French–Portuguese citizenship, so not counting as Portuguese citizens in French statistics, that number about 535,000 people in 2022. Despite the high naturalisation rate, the Portuguese remain one of the major foreign communities in France.

Relations between the two countries also remain strong and are based on mutual trust: both countries are EU and NATO members and share the same currency.

== Demographics ==
Year	Portugal-born population	Portuguese citizens (Excluding naturalised French)	Consulary records (Total Portuguese)	Other data
1959	20,000			
1970	700,000			
1990	798,837			
1995	600,000			
1999	454,488			555,000
2005	567,000			
2006	490,000			
2007	576,084			491,000
2008	580,240		1,079,524	490,502
2009	585,000		1,111,438	
2010	588,276		1,145,531	
2011	500,891	592,281	1,161,900	
2012	599,333		1,190,798	
2013	644,206		1,243,419	
2014	643,224	532,191	1,122,564	
2015	648,112	541,867	1,346,472	
2016	648,146	546,429	1,284,196	
2017	644,181	548,906	1,258,953	
2018	624,162	548,906	1,205,308	
2019	614,174	537,163	1,405,053	1,720,000–3,000,000
2020	614,174	537,163	1,456,721	
2021	627,929	546,309	1,551,756	
2022		535,136		2,000,000

Regional distribution of descendants
Regions	Île-de-France	Rhône-Alpes, Auvergne	Paca, Languedoc-Roussillon	other regions
% of total	36%	16%	3%	45%

In 2015, Michèle Tribalat, in an estimate of populations of foreign origin in 2011, estimated at least 1.5 million the number of people of Portuguese origin over three generations according to the following distribution:

Country of origin (thousands)	immigrants (all ages)	1st ^{generation} born in France (all ages)	2nd ^{generation} born in France (under 60 only)	Total
Portugal	592	613	317	1 522

Note: for the ^{2nd} generation born in France, only people aged under 60 are taken into account.

Therefore, according to this same study by Michèle Tribalat, people of Portuguese origin over three generations represented 2.7% of the French population under 60 in 2011.

== Destination ==
=== Île-de-France ===
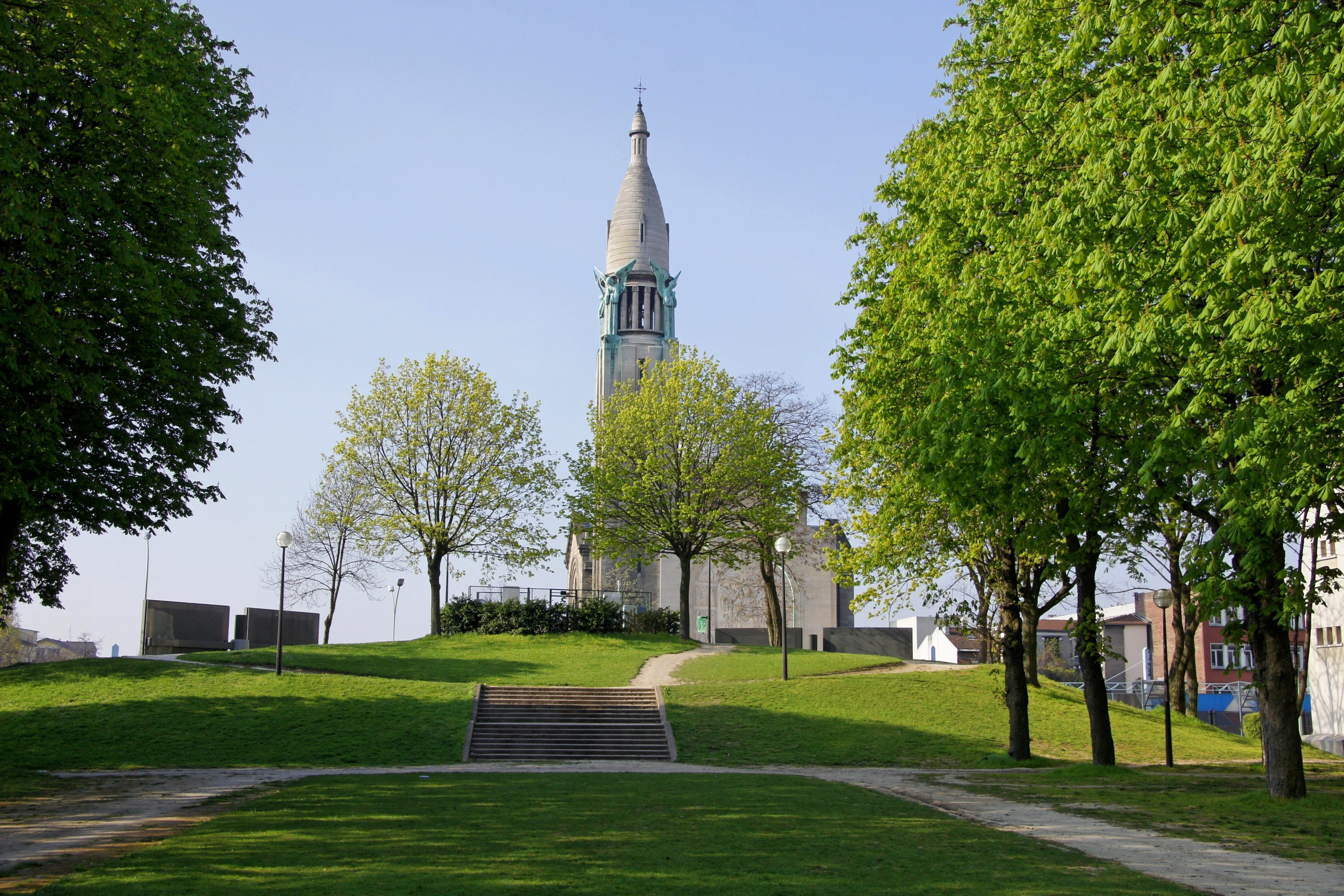
Portuguese catholic church in Gentilly, seen from the Cité Internationale Universitaire de Paris

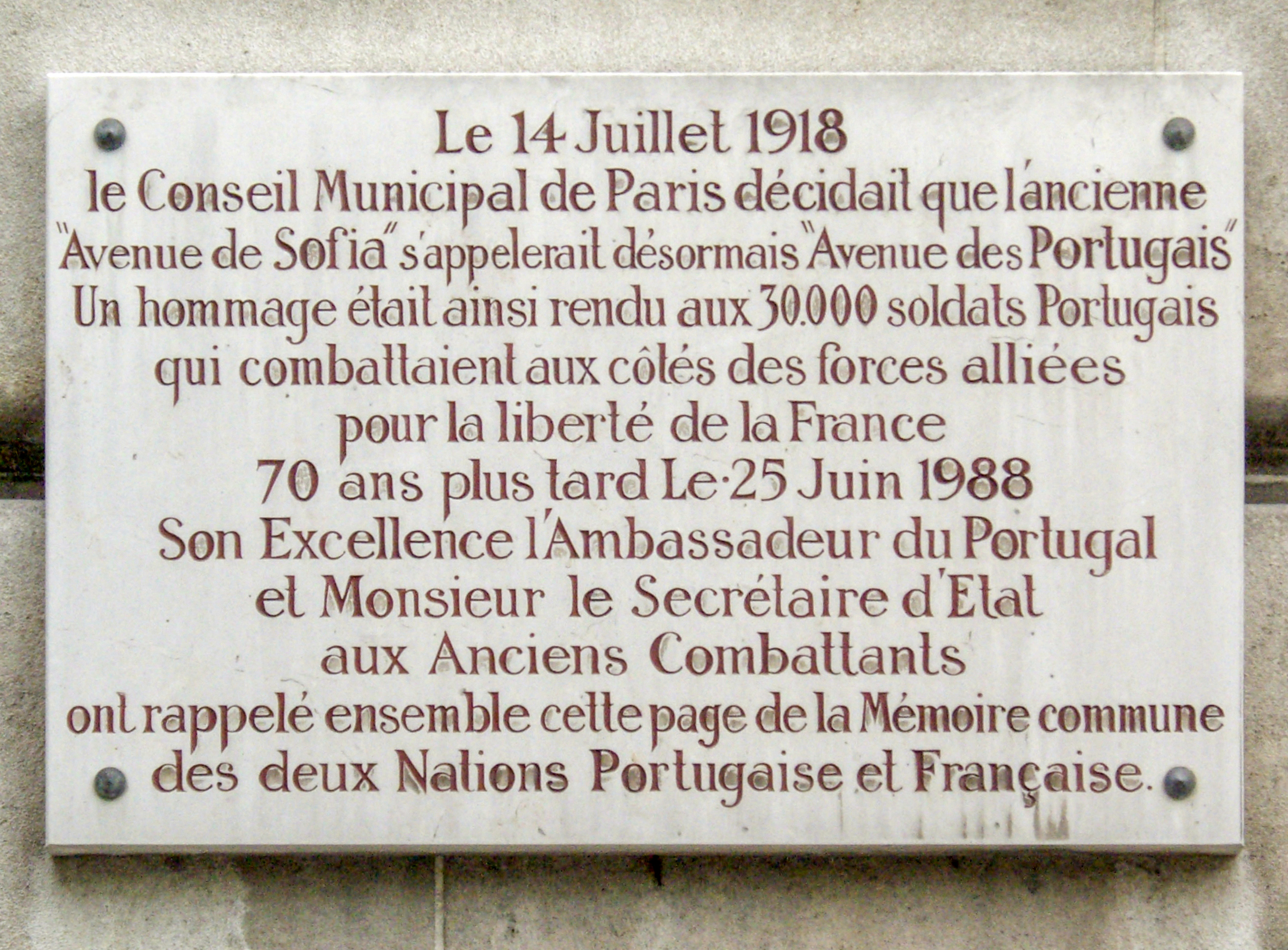
"Portuguese" Avenue in Paris

In the 1960s, many Portuguese immigrants formed the shantytown of Champigny-sur-Marne which had more than 10,000 inhabitants.

Several other Portuguese slums have been formed, such as that of Massy for example or that of Francs-Moisins in Saint-Denis. The shantytowns disappeared between the end of the 1960s and the beginning of the 1970s and were replaced by HLM (Habitation à Loyer Modéré or Social Housing).

Since 1988, the church of Marie-Médiatrice-de-Toutes-les-Grâces has been entrusted to the Portuguese community of Paris under the name of "Notre-Dame-de-Fatima-Marie-Médiatrice".

In 2016 approximately 235,000 people living in the region were born in Portugal accounting for 2% of the population, concentrated especially in Val-de-Marne.

=== Corsica ===
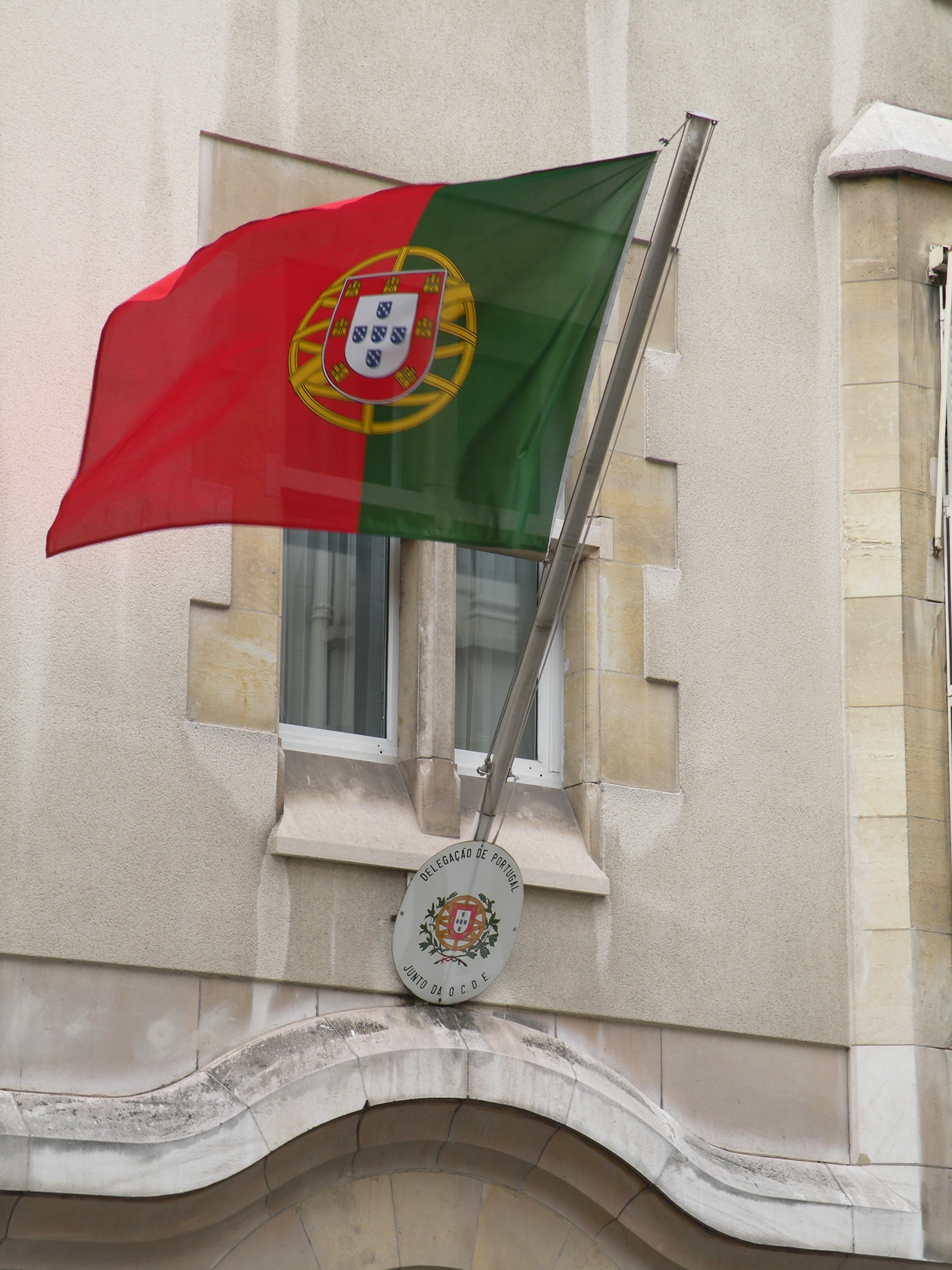
Portuguese diplomatic mission to the OECD in Paris

In 2004, the Portuguese community in Corsica was one of the largest communities with more than 13,000 Portuguese.

=== Nouvelle Aquitanie ===
As in the past, when many Portuguese-Jews settled in western France, in the 20th century the Portuguese community moving to the region became visible.

Cerizay, for instance, where more than 20% of the population is of Portuguese descent, is considered one of the "most Portuguese" communes in France. Similarly, in Labouheyre around 15% of the population is of Portuguese origin and in Lissac-sur-Couze a cemetery was dedicated to the Portuguese.

=== Alpes-Maritimes ===
The Portuguese community in the Alpes-Maritimes département is well established. Already in 1989, the 5,000 people-strong Portuguese community was praised for being well integrated.

=== Brittany ===
The Portuguese came to Brittany since Antiquity, due to the commercial links between Phoenician Lisbon and the North Sea. In the 1950s, due to emigration, many settled in the region. For instance, 10% of the population of Groix Island (île de Groix) is of Portuguese descent.

== Media ==
- Radio Alfa, Portuguese-speaking radio broadcasting in Île-de-France. Since June 1989, Radio Alfa has organized a popular event about Lusophone music, which is the Festa dos Santos Populares (French: fête Des Saints Populaires ), being the largest gathering of the Portuguese community in Europe. It has more than 480,000 weekly listeners
- Radio Antenne Portugaise, Portuguese-speaking radio.
- RFI – português; Portuguese-language version of Radio France internationale.
- Frantugal.TV; small Franco-Portuguese channel, available for a monthly fee. They offer many documentaries on the reality of the Portuguese in France.

== Literature ==
- Portugais et population d'origine portugaise en France by Jorge Rodrigues Ruivo
- La Valise en carton by Linda de Suza
- 100 ans d'histoire des Portugais en France by Marie-Christine Volovitch-Tavares.
- Les Portugais à Paris, au fil des siècles et des arrondissements by Agnès Pellerin, Xavier de Castro, Anne Lima
- Portugais et Luso-Français by Teresa Carreira and Maria Alice Tome
- La présence portugaise en France du XIIIème siècle à nos jours, by Manuel Do Nascimento

== Cinema ==
- Vacances portugaises (Portuguese Vacation 1963), by Pierre Kast
- Deux (Two, 2002), by Werner Schroeter
- Love Actually (2003), by Richard Curtis
- A Religiosa Portuguesa (The Portuguese Nun, 2009) by Eugène Green
- A Gaiola Dourada (The Gilded Cage, 2013) by Ruben Alves
- Opération Portugal (Portugal Operation, 2021), by Frank Cimière

== Notable people ==
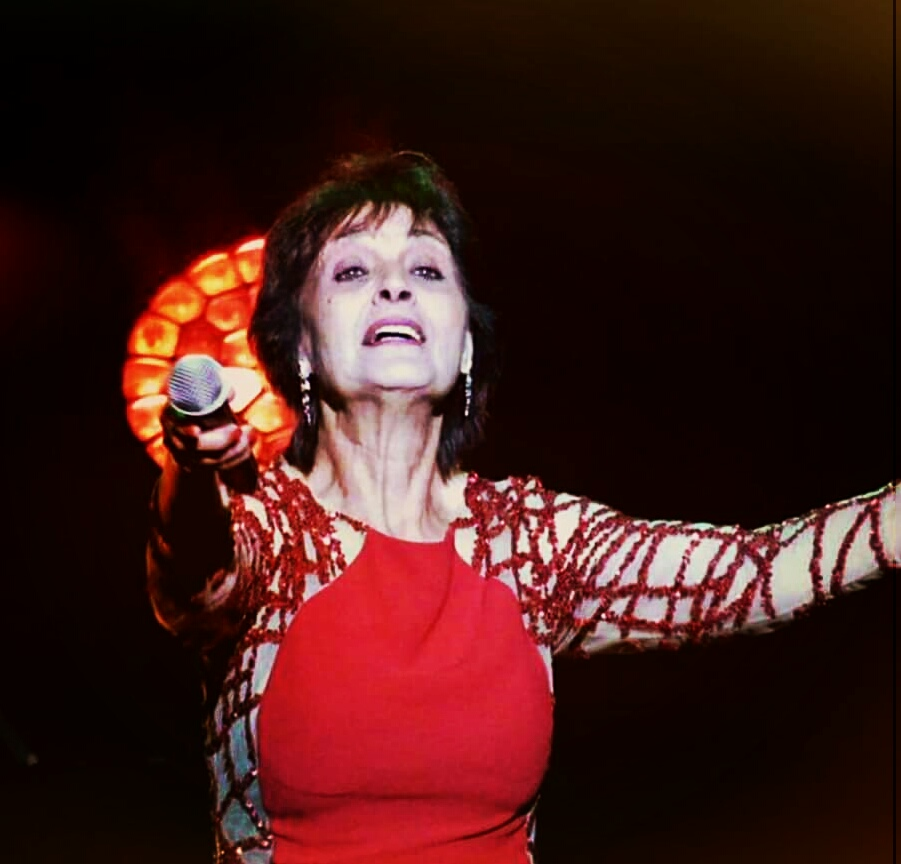
Linda de Souza

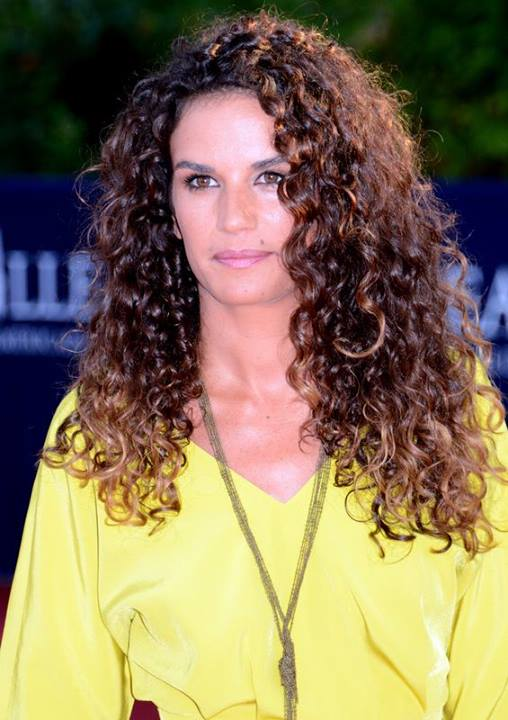
Barbara Cabrita

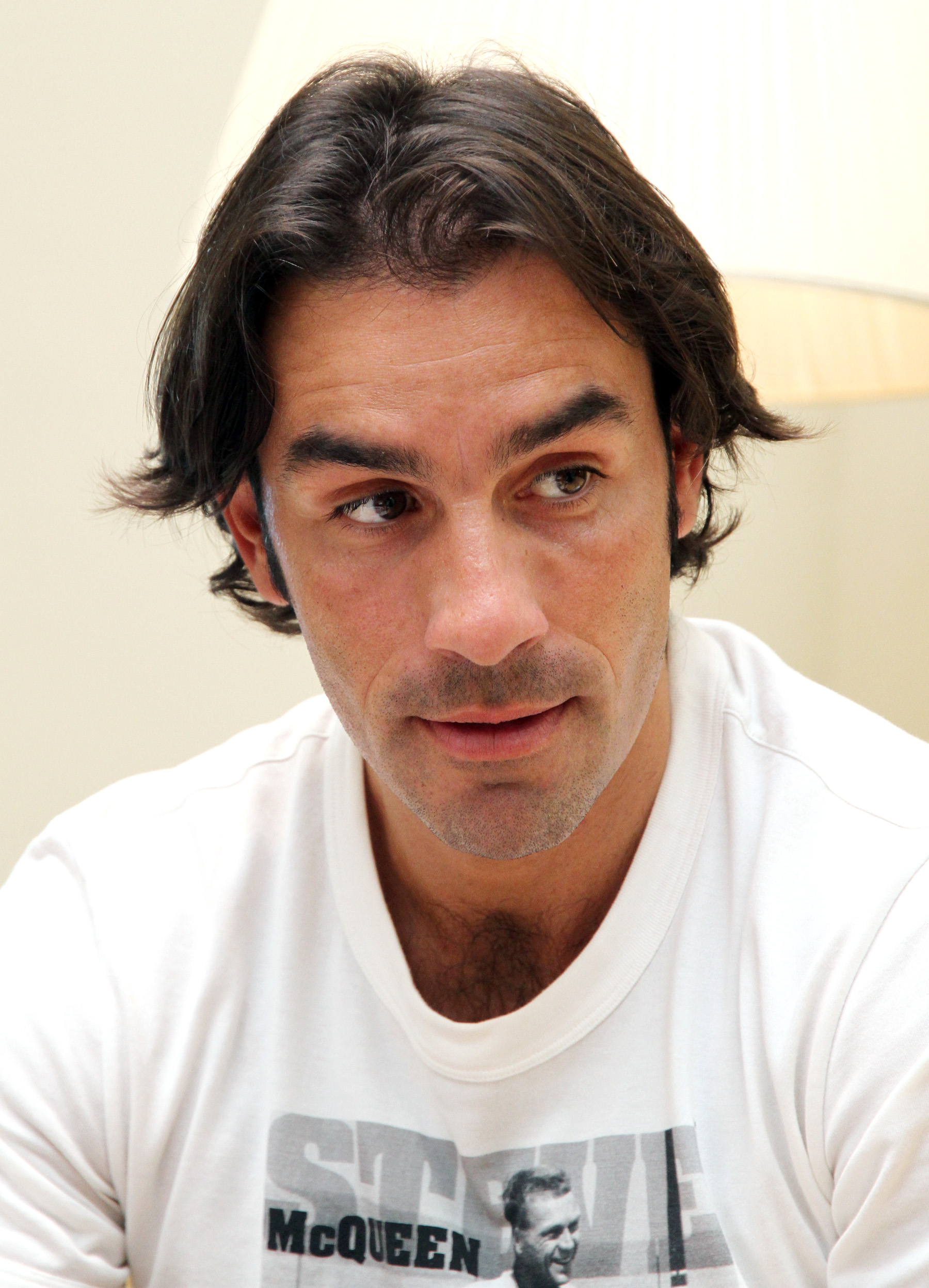
Robert Pires

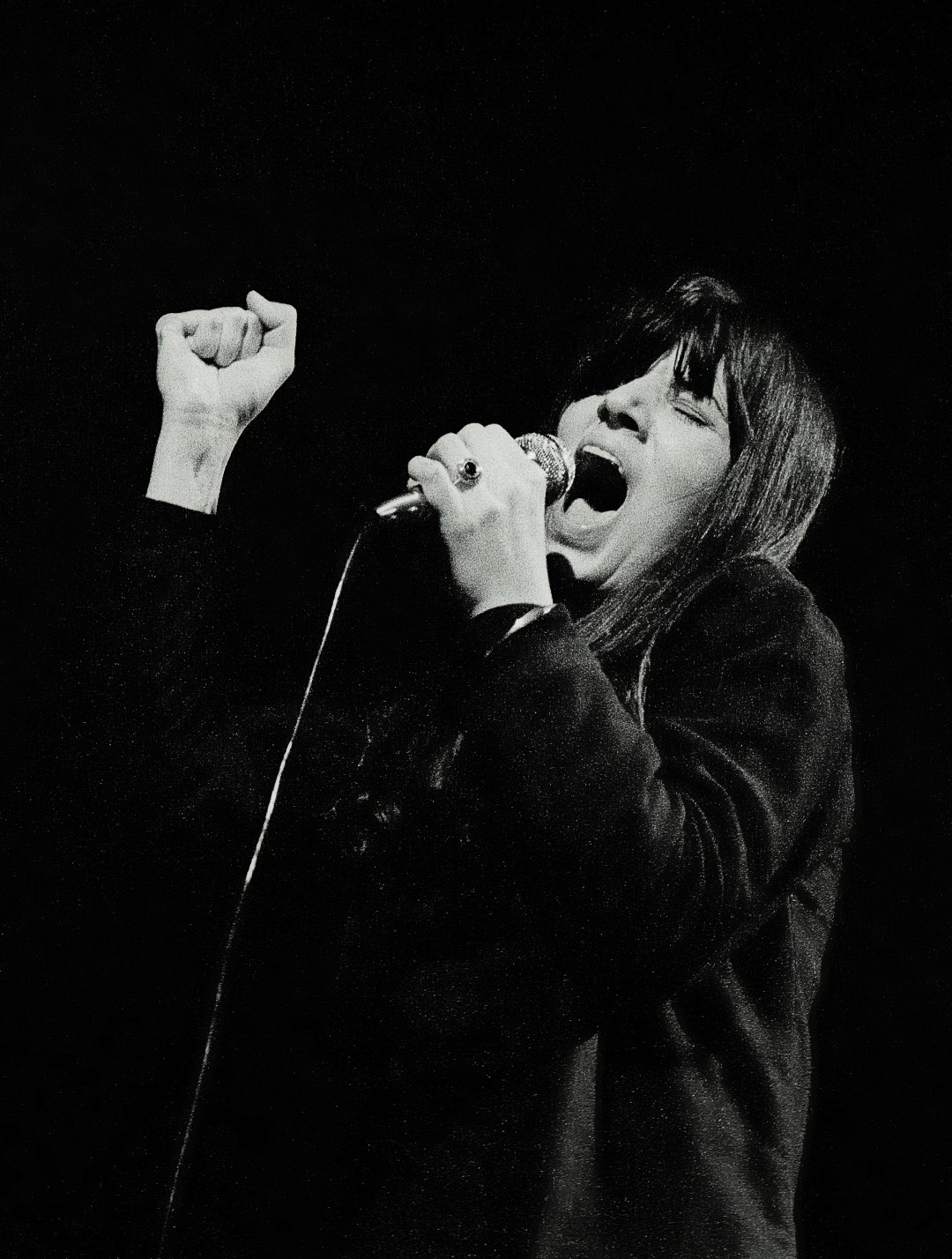
Catherine Ribeiro

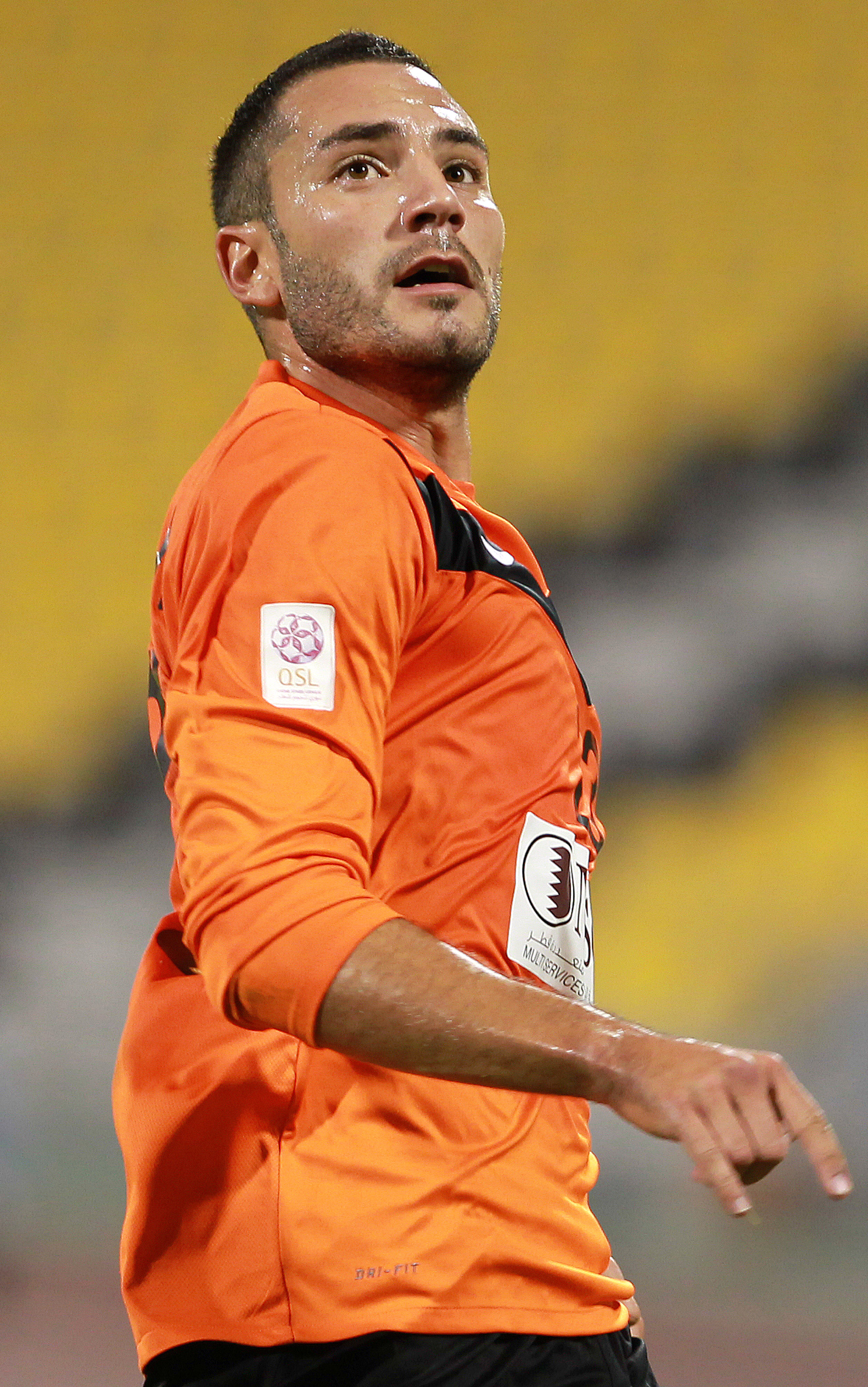
Mourad Meghni

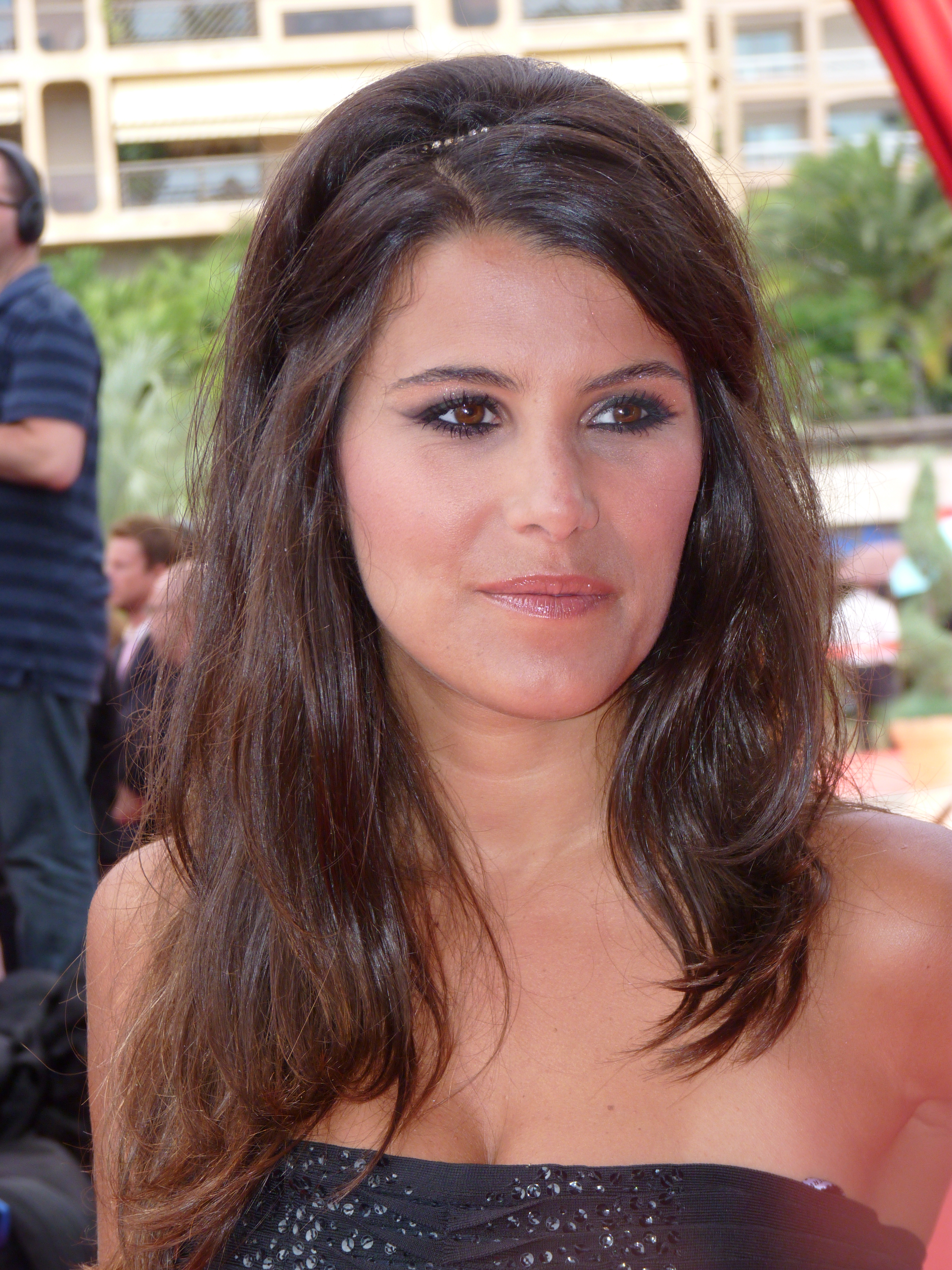
Karine Ferri

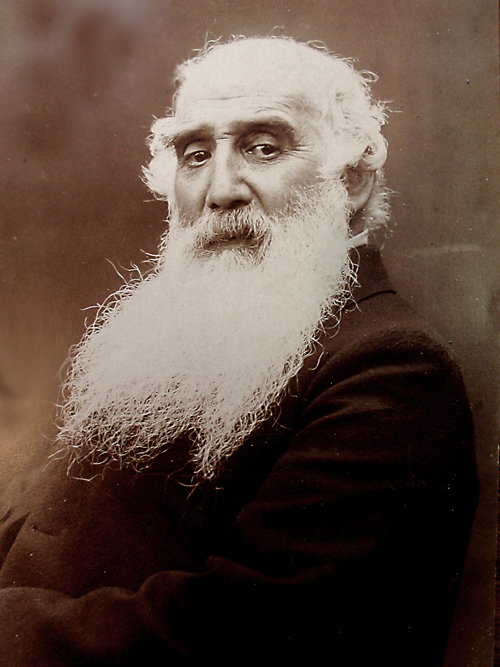
Camille Pissaro

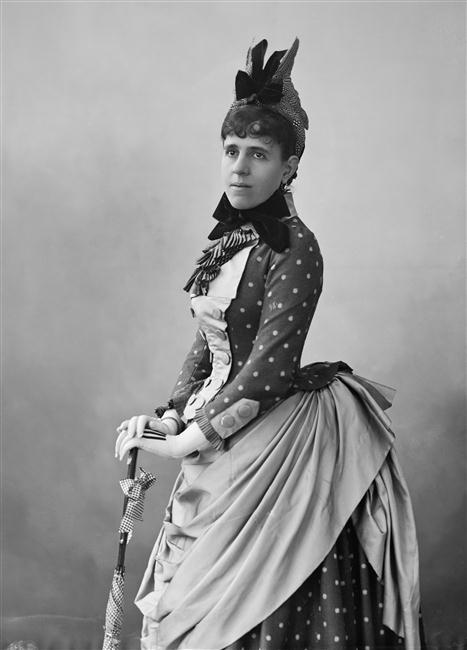
Geneviève Halévy

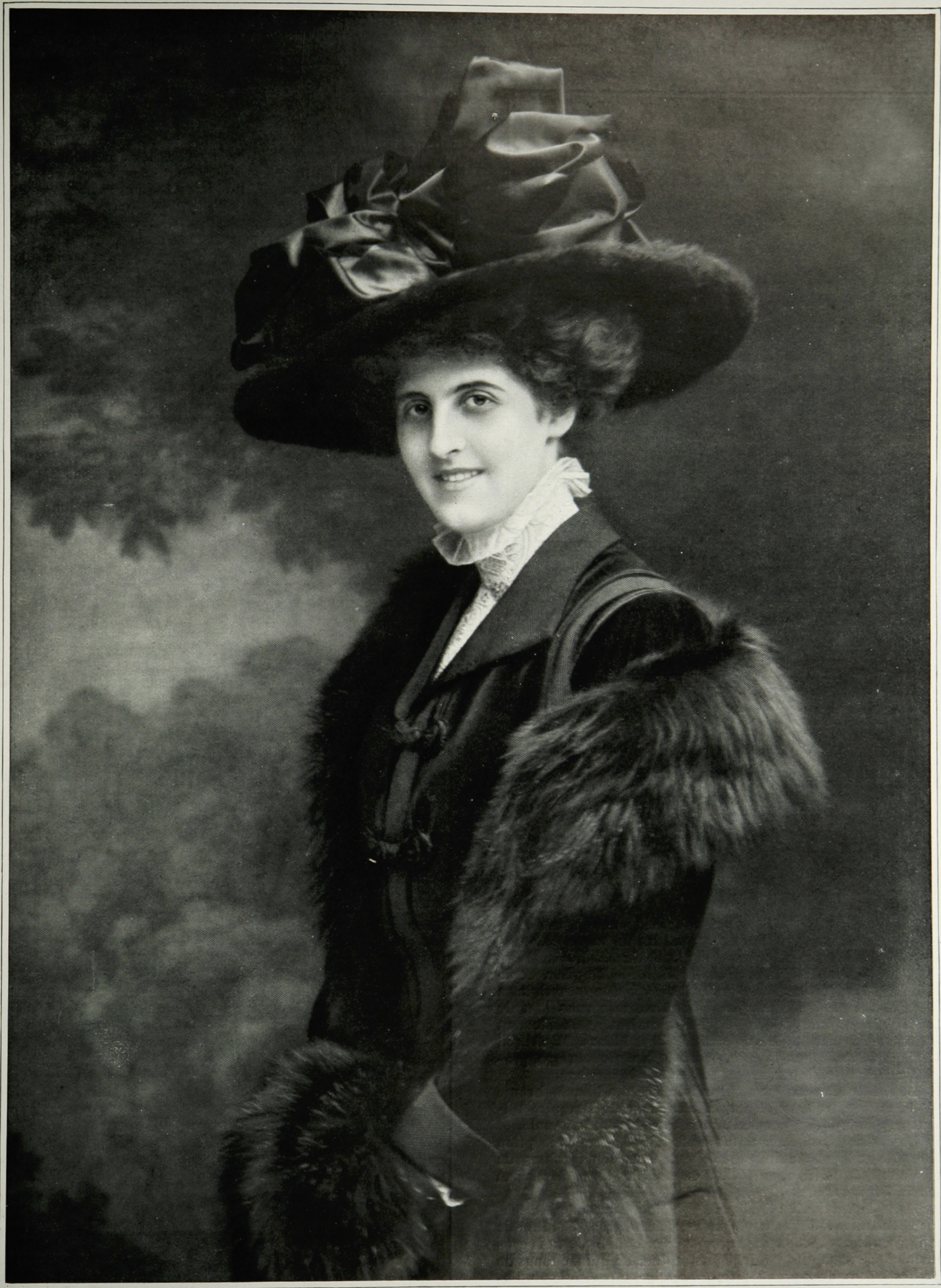
Noémie de Rothschild

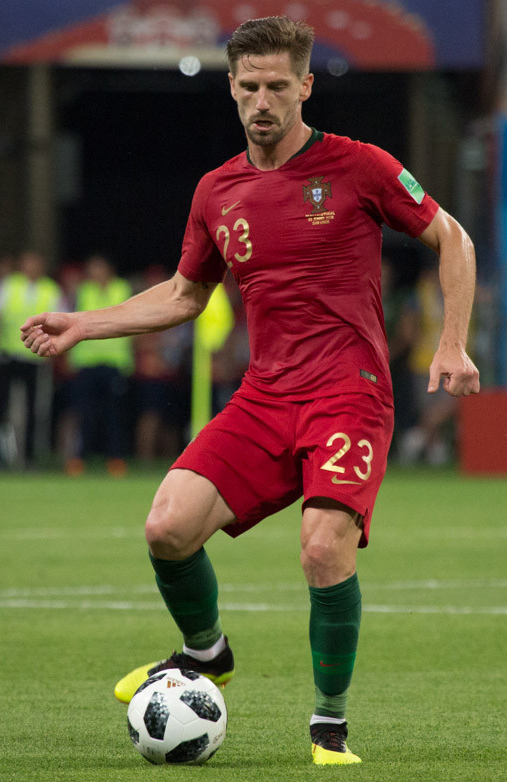
Adrien Silva

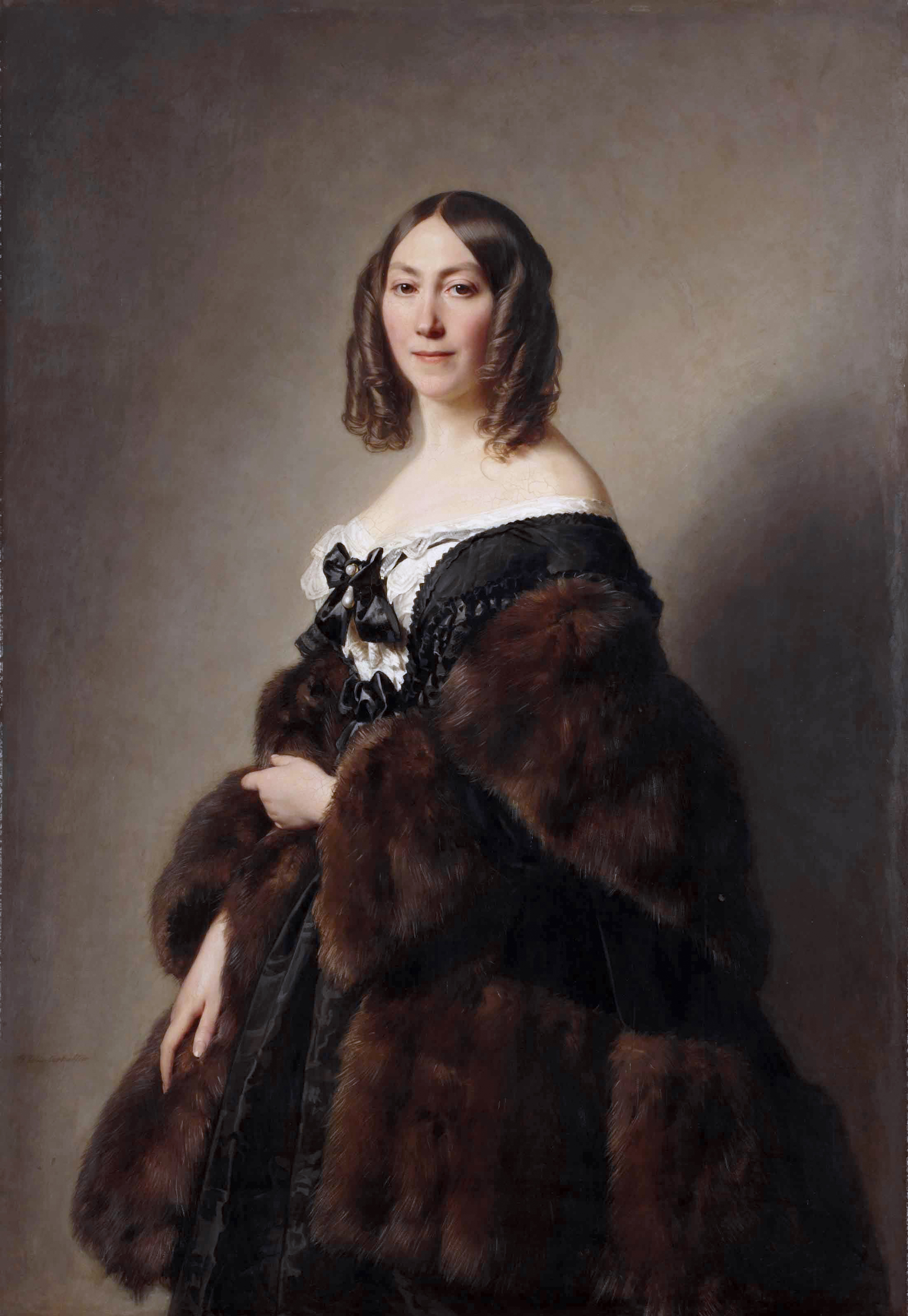
Cécile Furtado-Heine

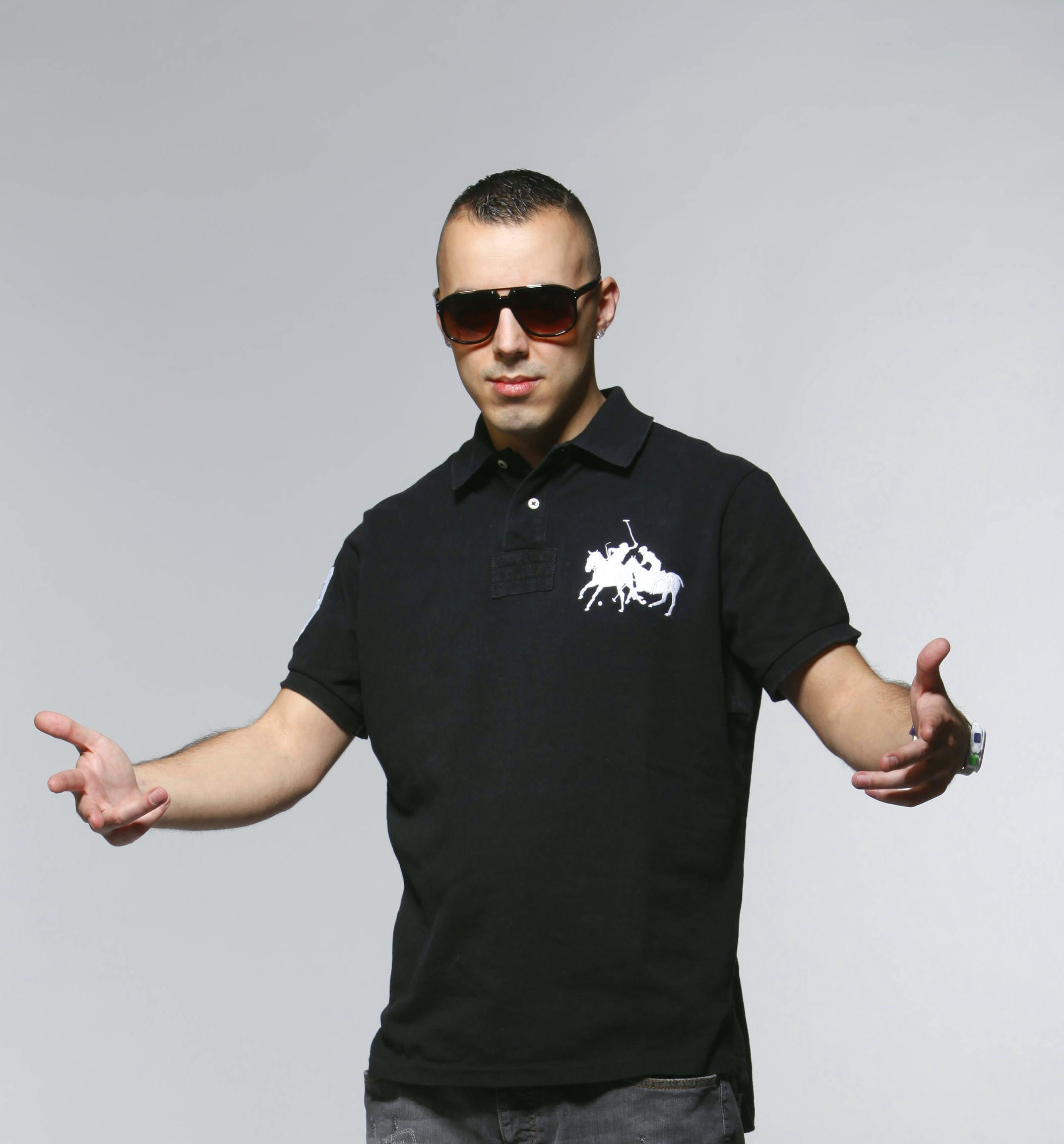
Lucenzo

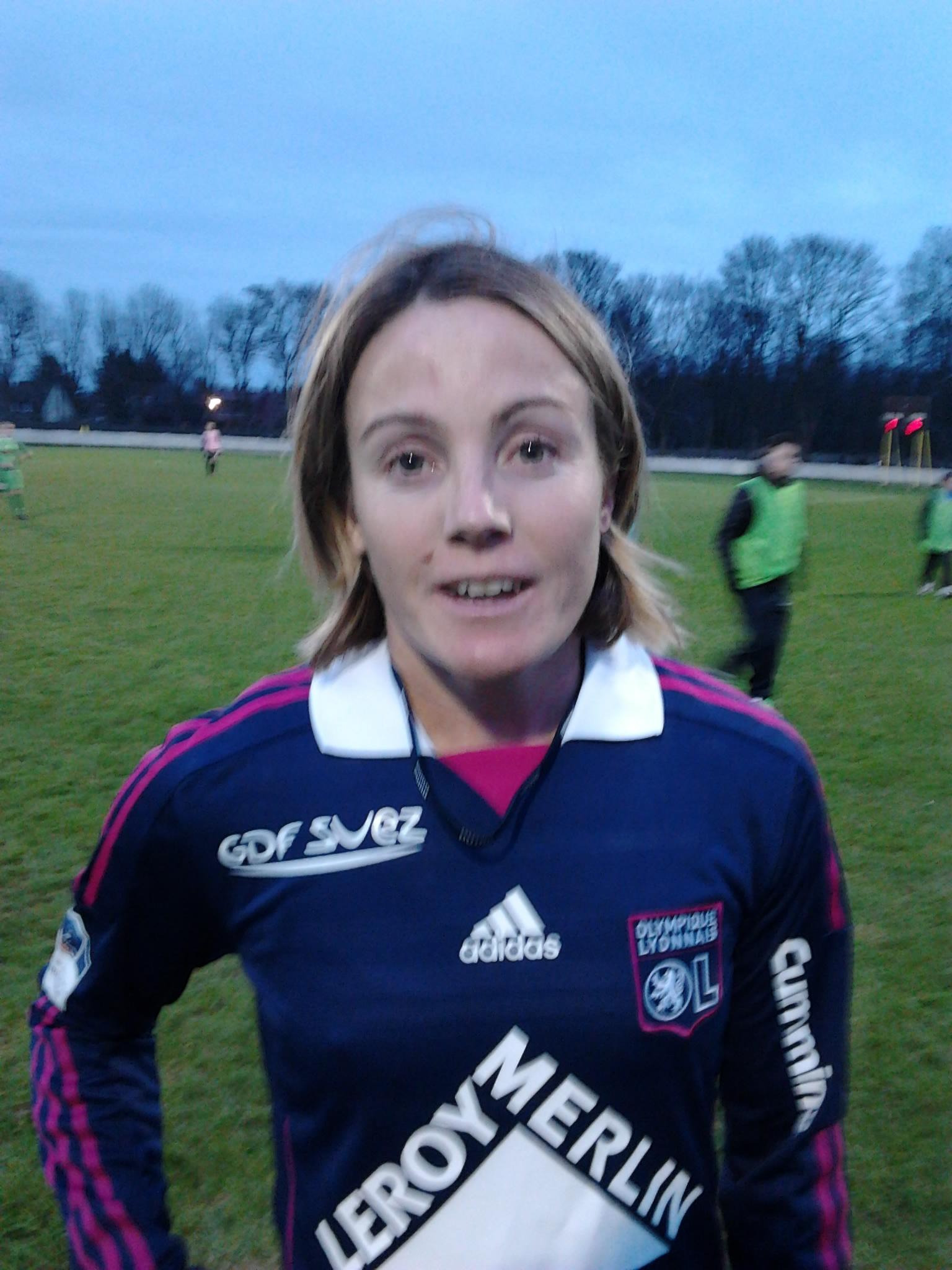
Sonia Bompastor

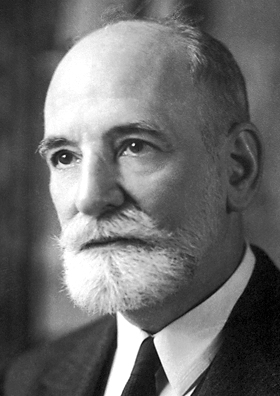
René Cassin

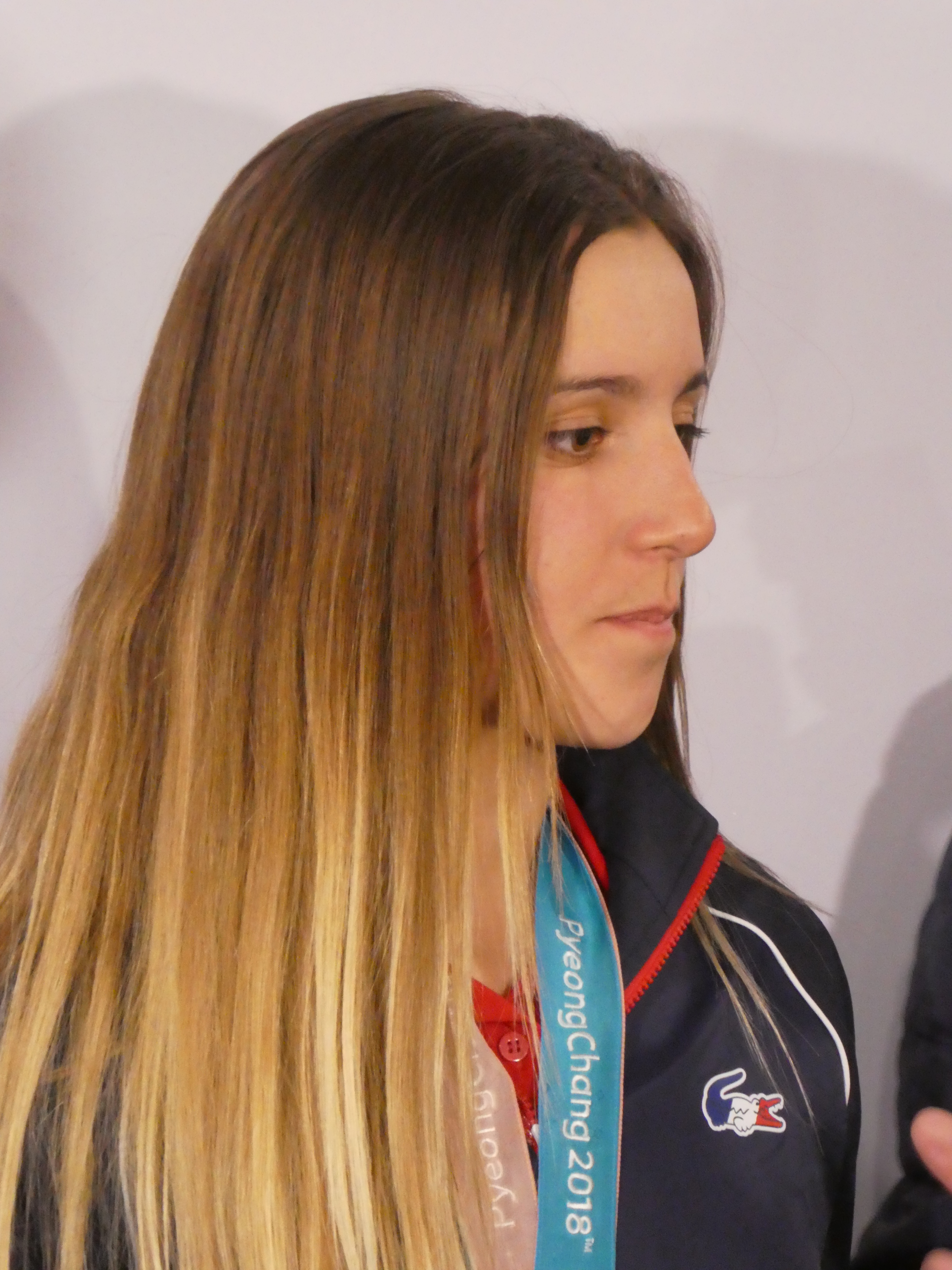
Julia Pereira de Sousa Mabileau

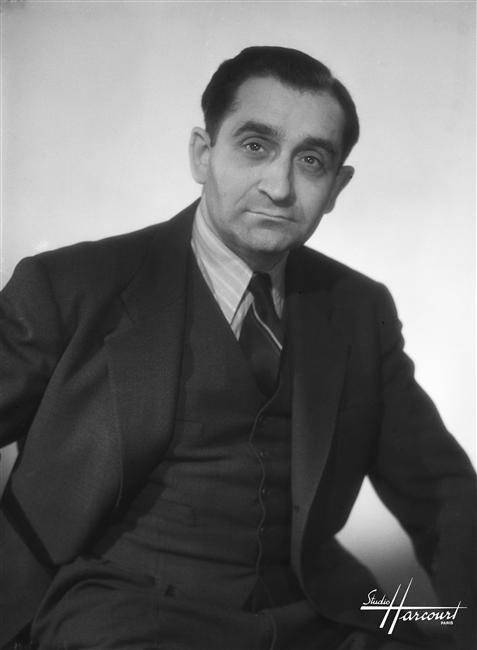
Pierre Mendès France

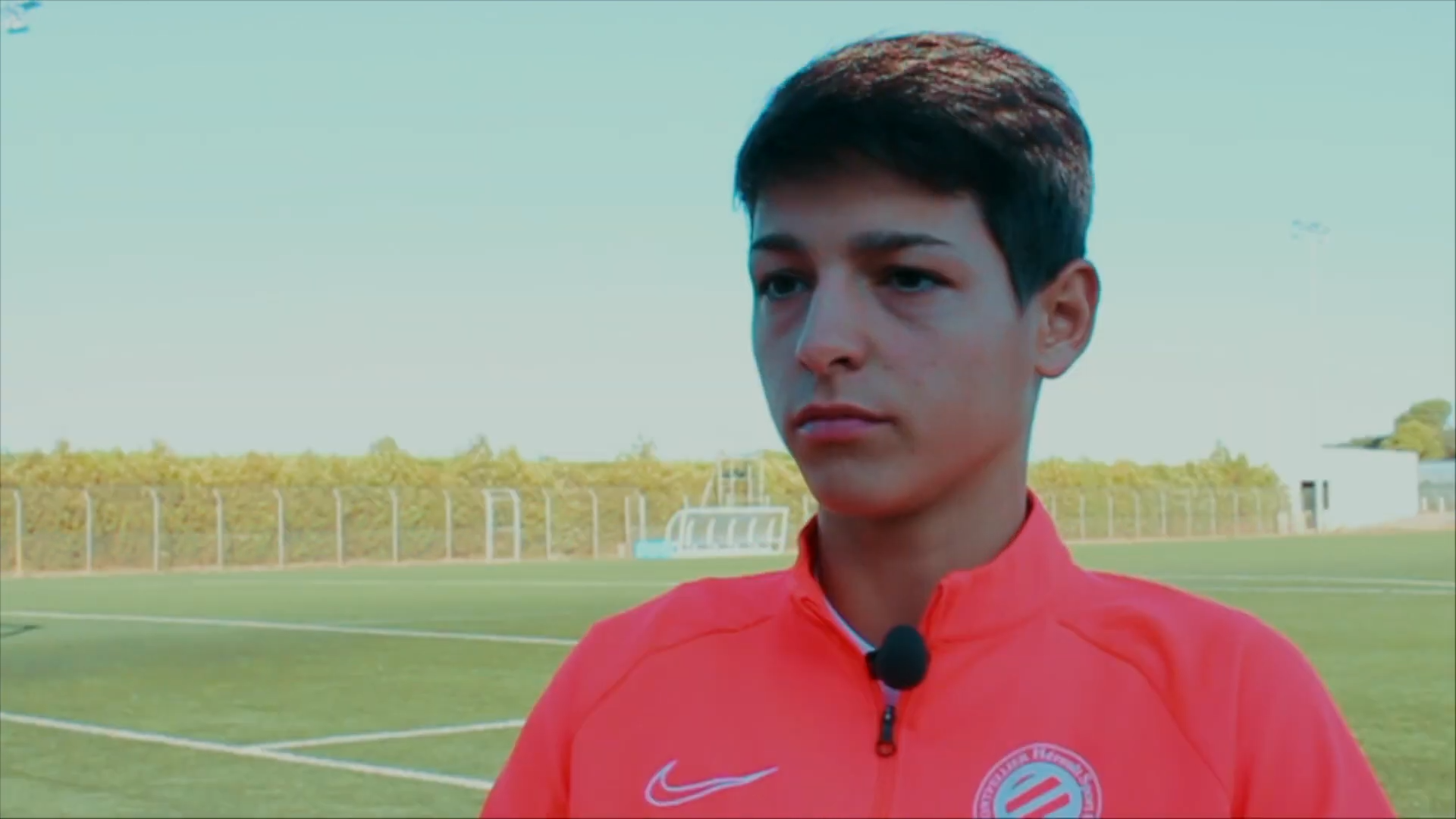
Elisa De Almeida

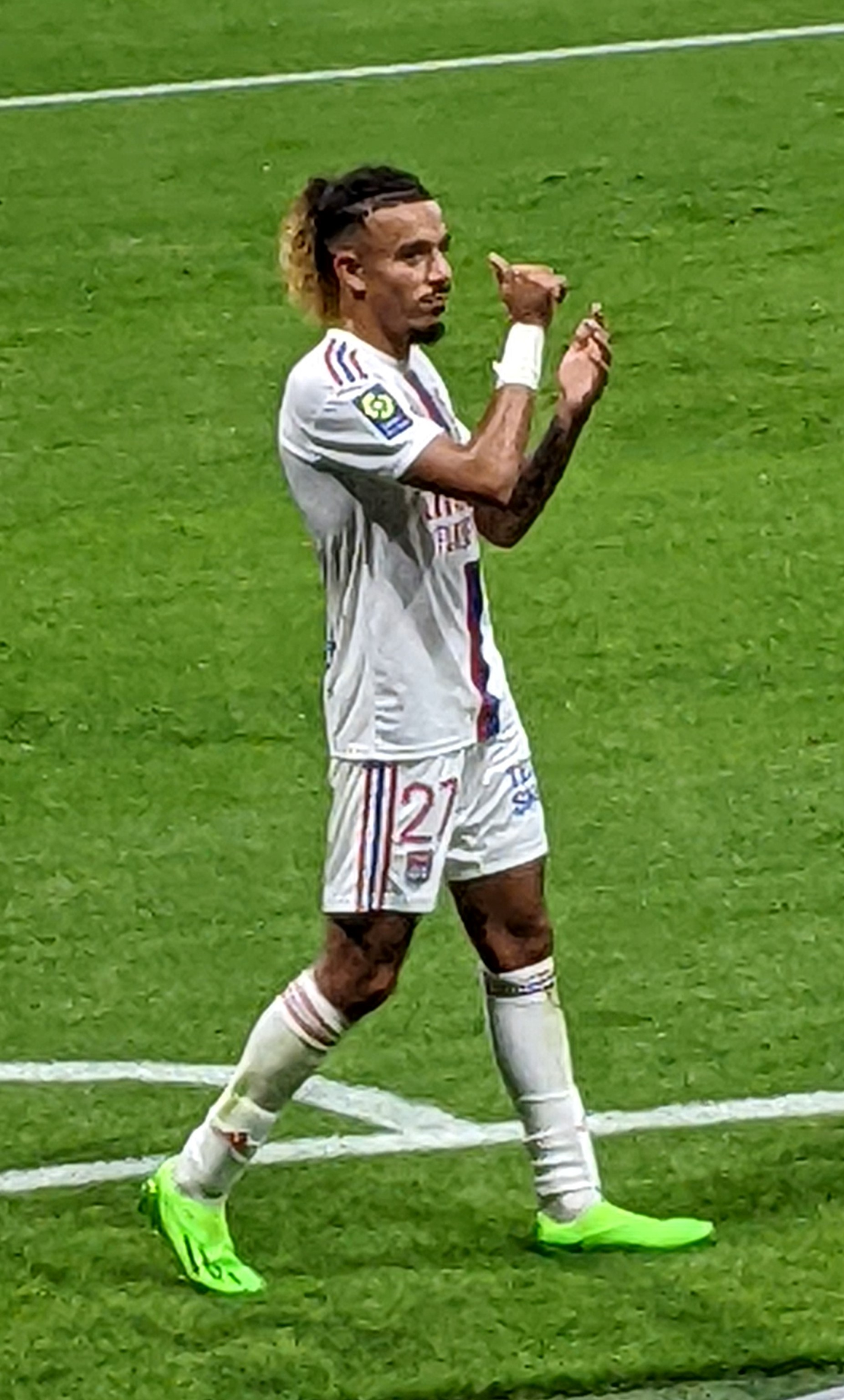
Malo Gusto

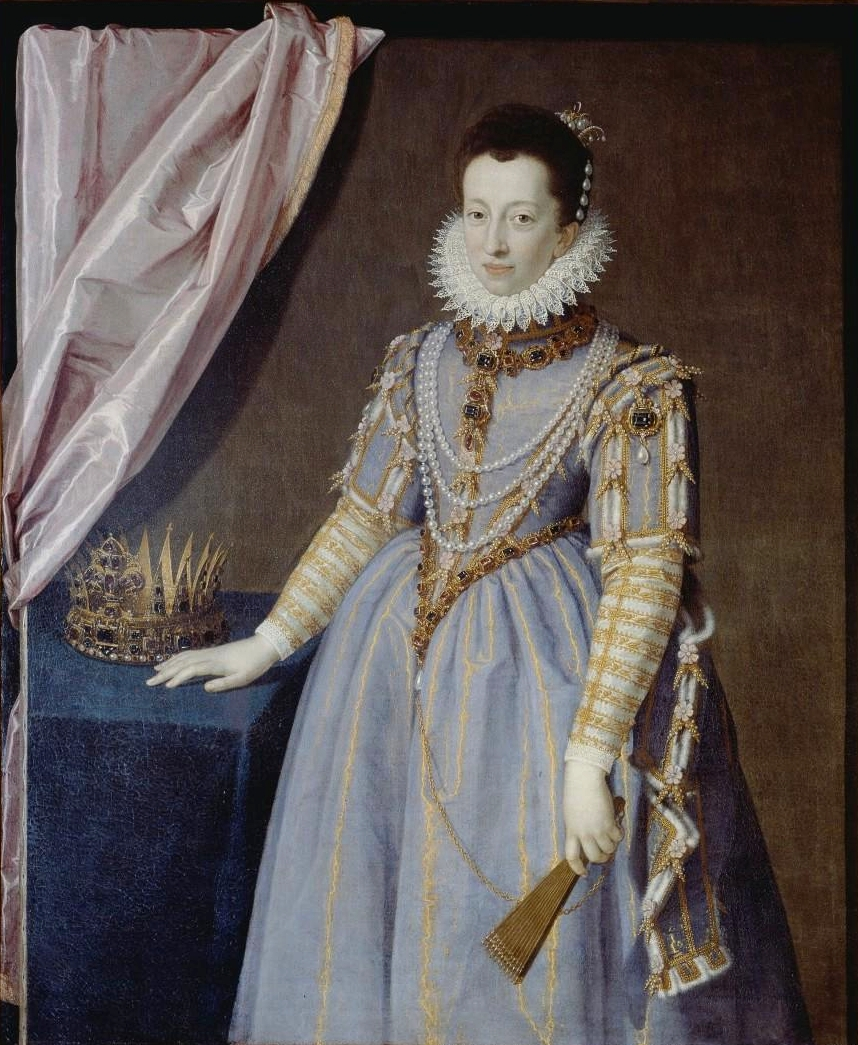
Christina of Lorraine

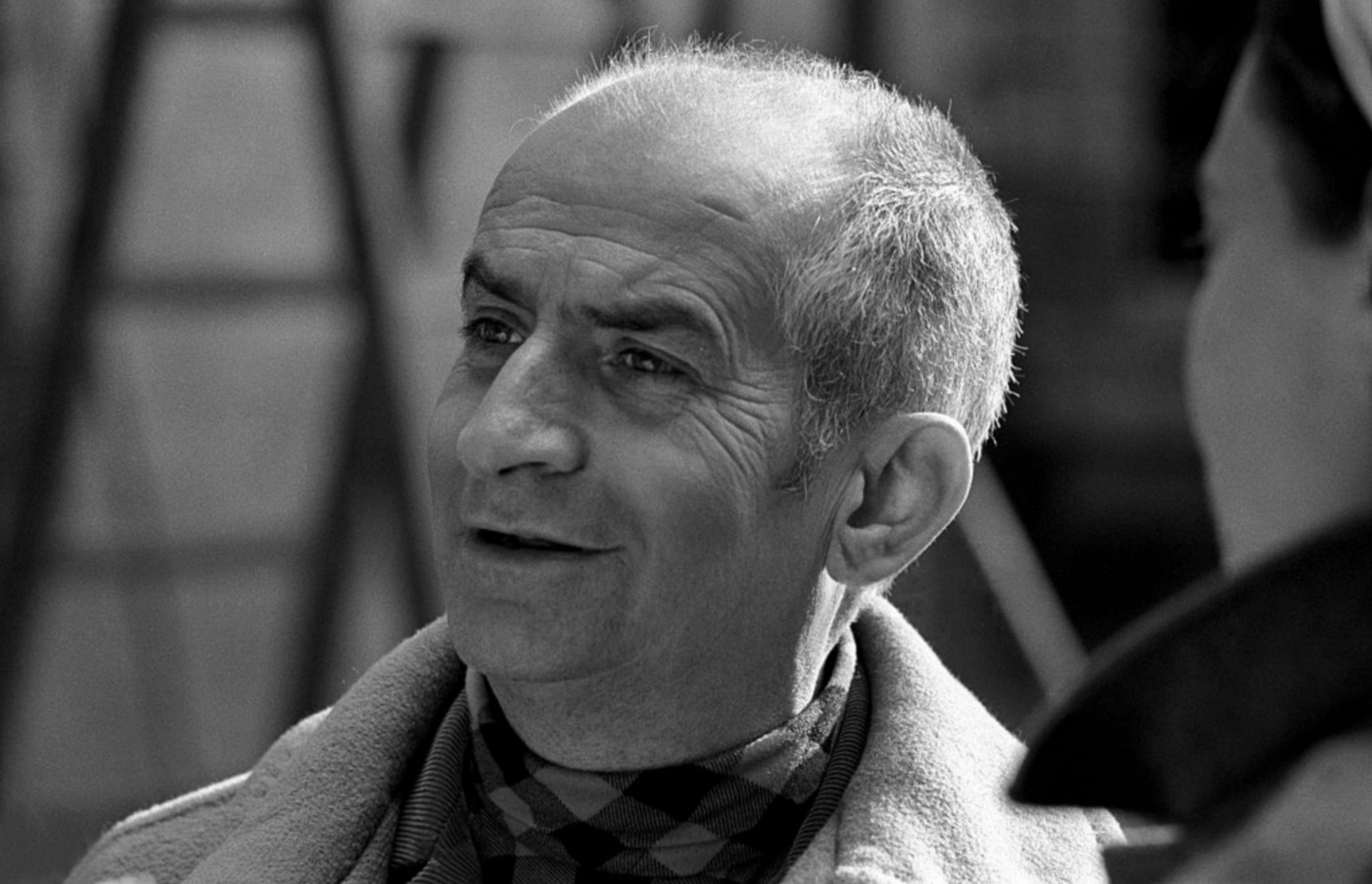
Louis de Funès

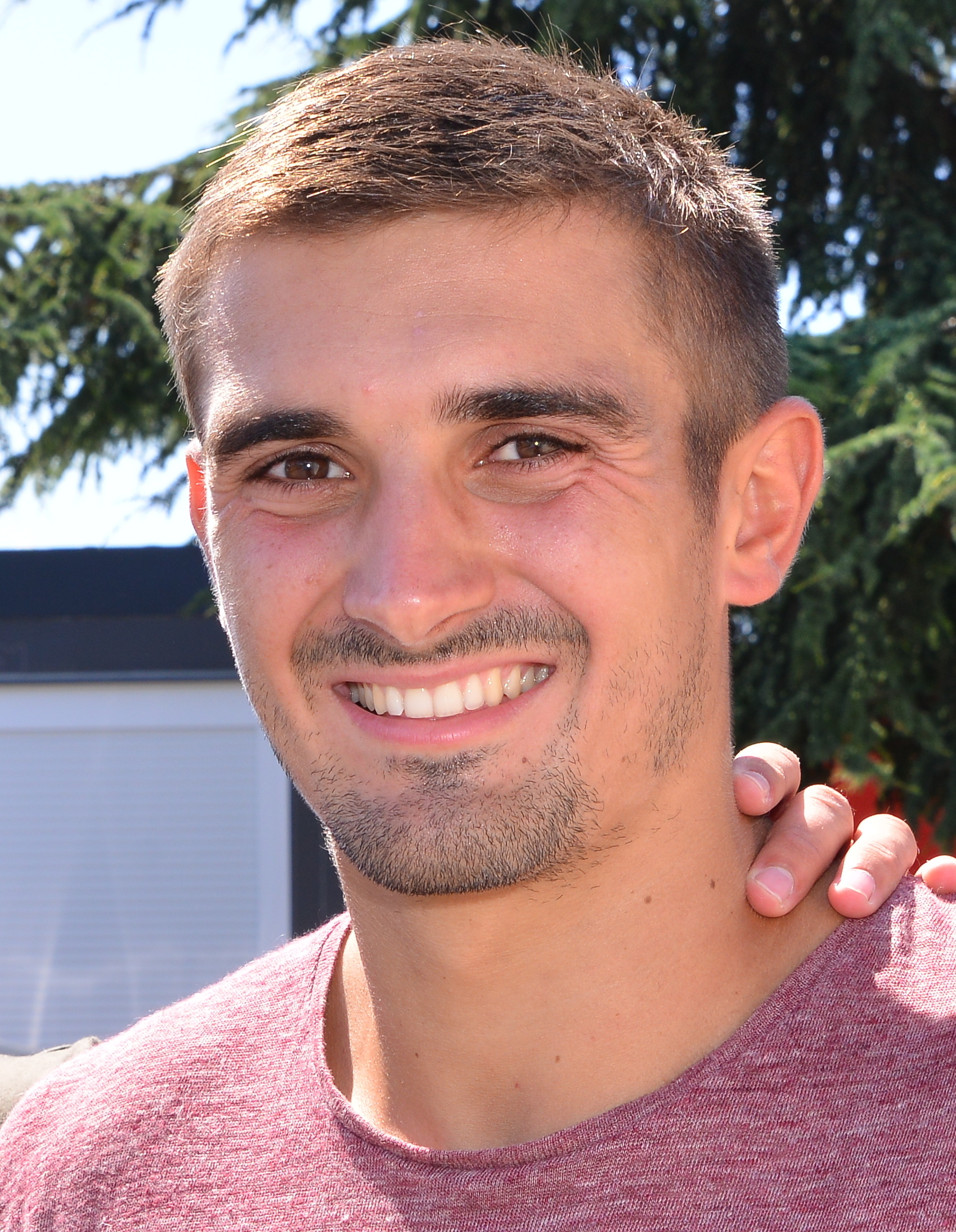
Thomas Ramos

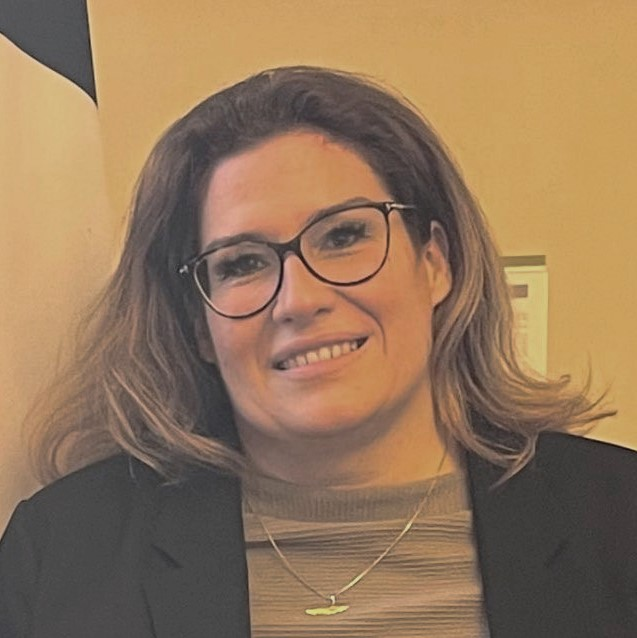
Sonia Backès

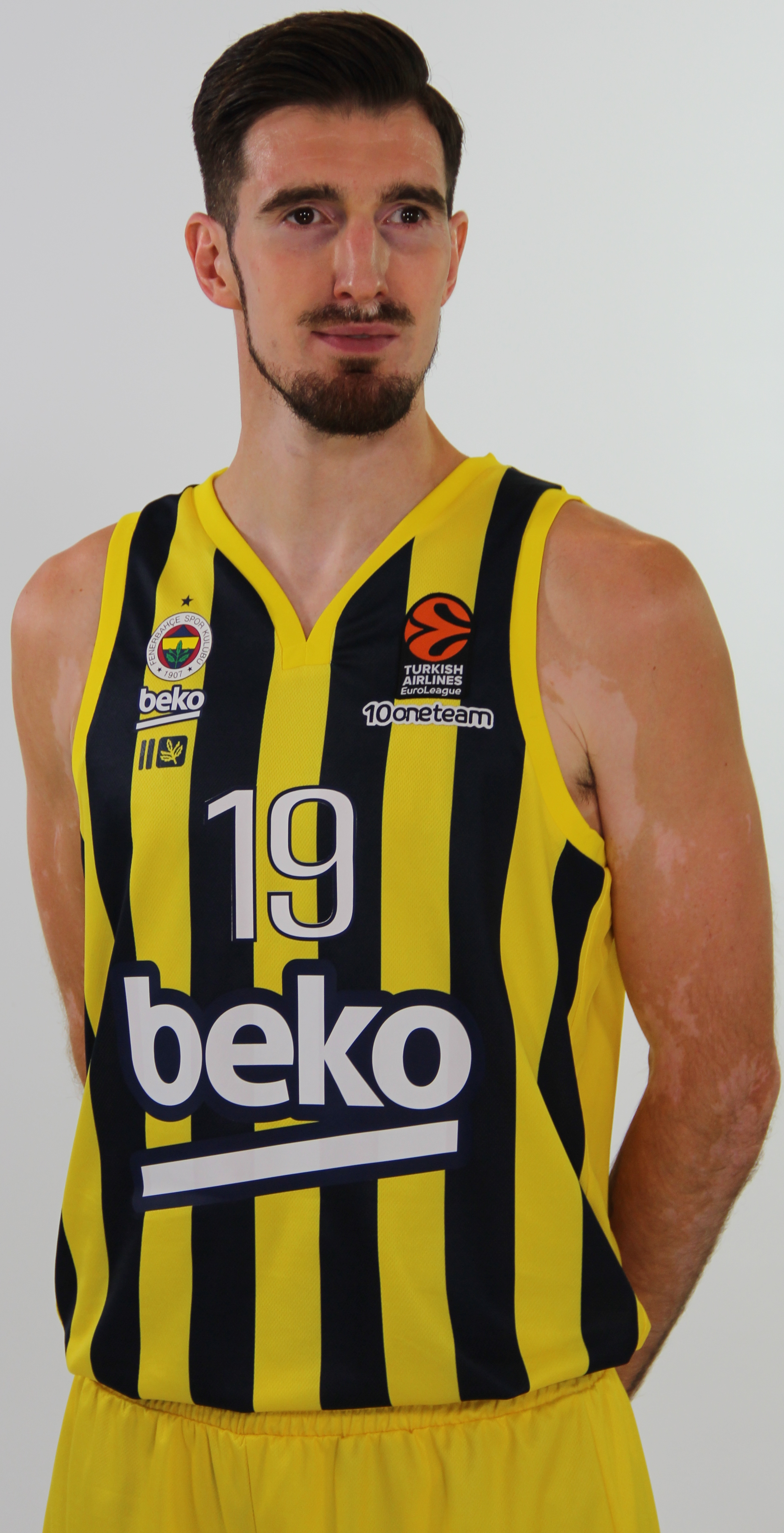
Nando de Colo

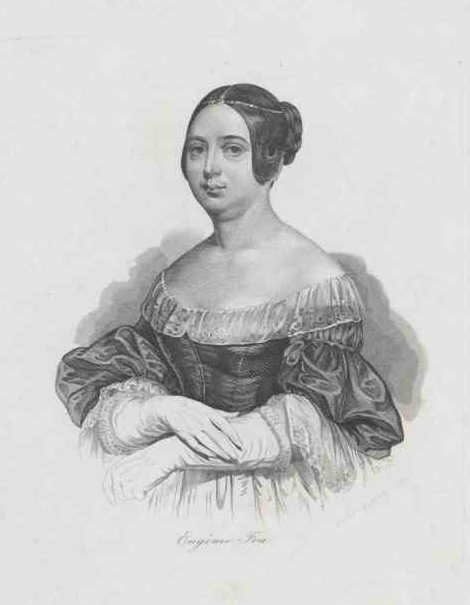
Eugénie Foa

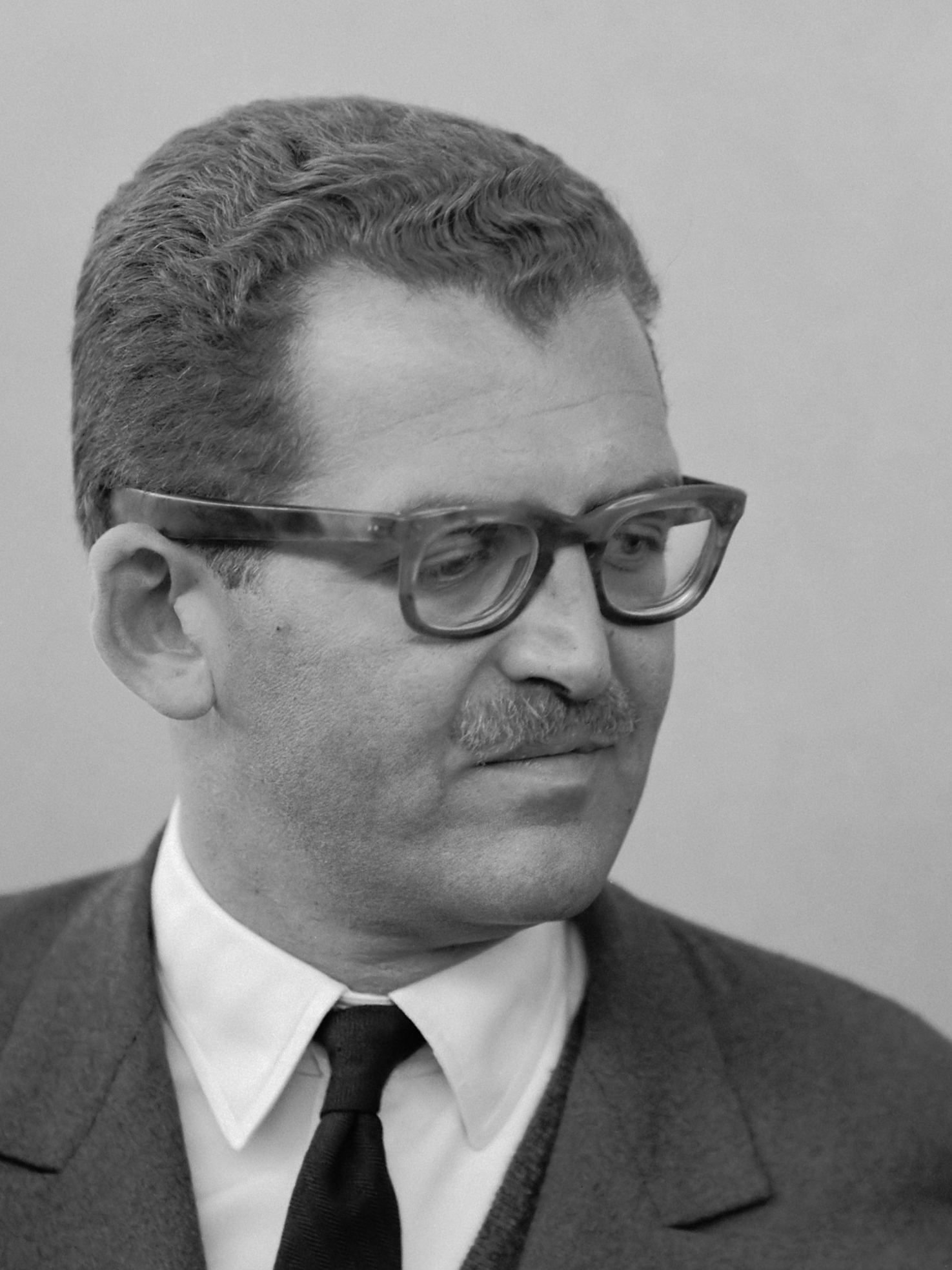
Edmond de Rothschild

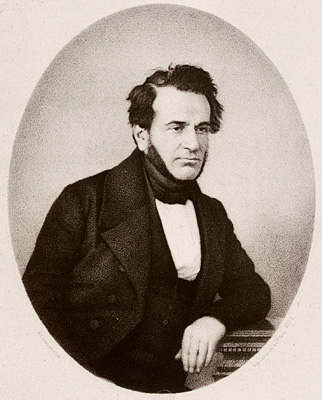
Olinde Rodrigues

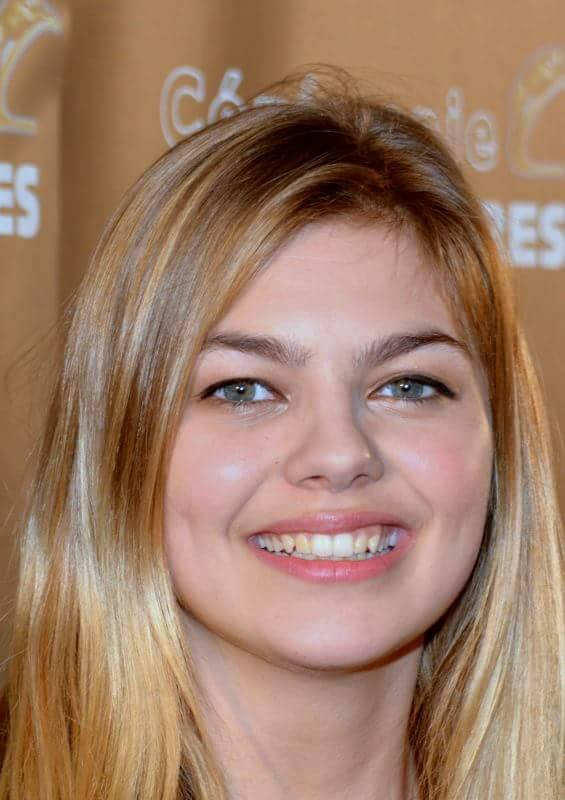
Louane Emera

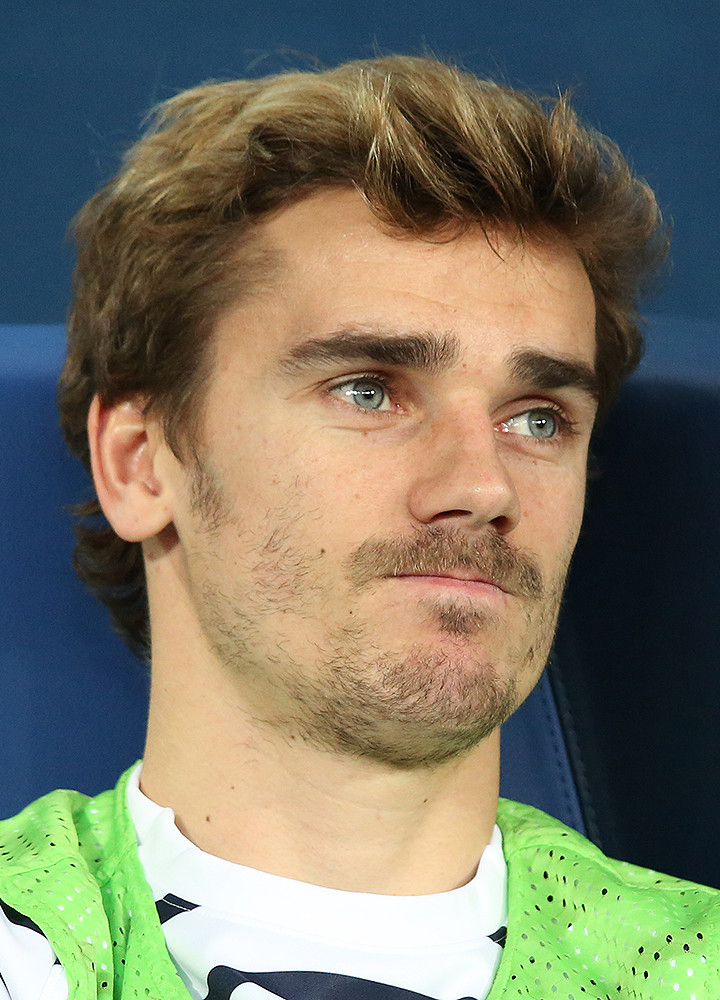
Antoine Griezmann

== See also ==
- France–Portugal relations
- Portuguese diaspora
- Immigration to France
- Portuguese in Belgium
- Portuguese in Germany
- Portuguese in the United Kingdom
- Portuguese Luxembourger
- Portuguese in the Netherlands
- Portuguese in Switzerland
