= Portuguese in the Netherlands =

Portuguese in the Netherlands Portugezen in Nederland Portugueses nos Países Baixos
- Netherlands (Portugal)

Total population
- 35,779

Regions with significant populations
- Netherlands

Languages
- Portuguese, Dutch

Religion
- Roman Catholicism, Judaism, Irreligion

Related ethnic groups
- Portuguese people, Portuguese Jews in the Netherlands, Portuguese Jews in the UK, Portuguese Jews in Turkey, Portuguese Jews in Israel, Indo people, Mardijker people, Portuguese Surinamese, Portuguese Indonesians

Portuguese in the Netherlands (Dutch: Portugezen in Nederland; Portuguese: Portugueses nos Países Baixos), also Portuguese Dutch (Portuguese Nederlanders; Português neerlandês), Dutch Portuguese (Nederlandse Portugezen) or Luso-Dutch (Luso-neerlandês), are the citizens or residents of the Netherlands whose ethnic origins lie in Portugal.

Portuguese Dutch are Portuguese-born citizens with a Dutch citizenship or Dutch-born citizens of Portuguese ancestry or citizenship.

== History ==
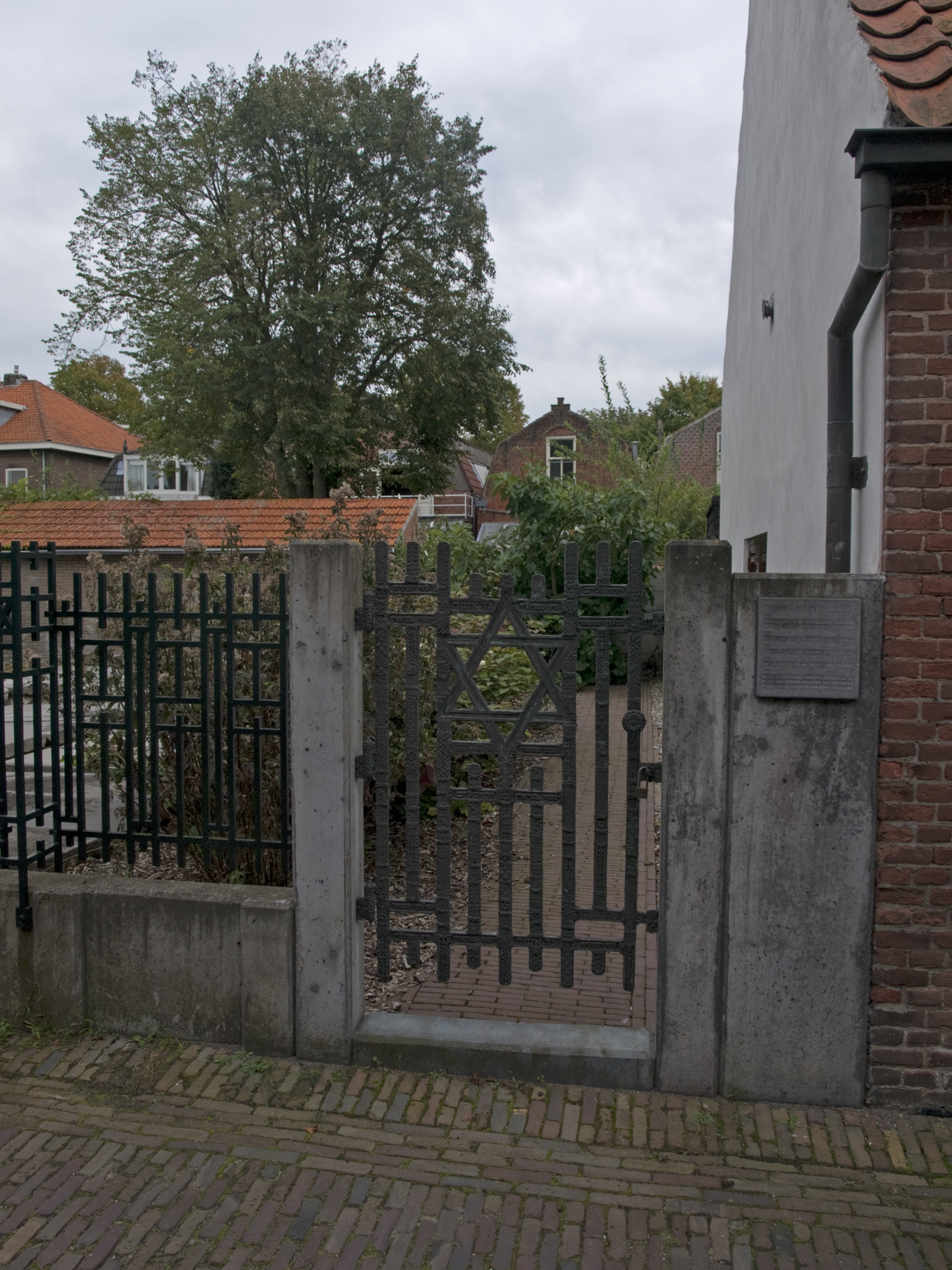
Portuguese-Jewish cemetery in Middelburg

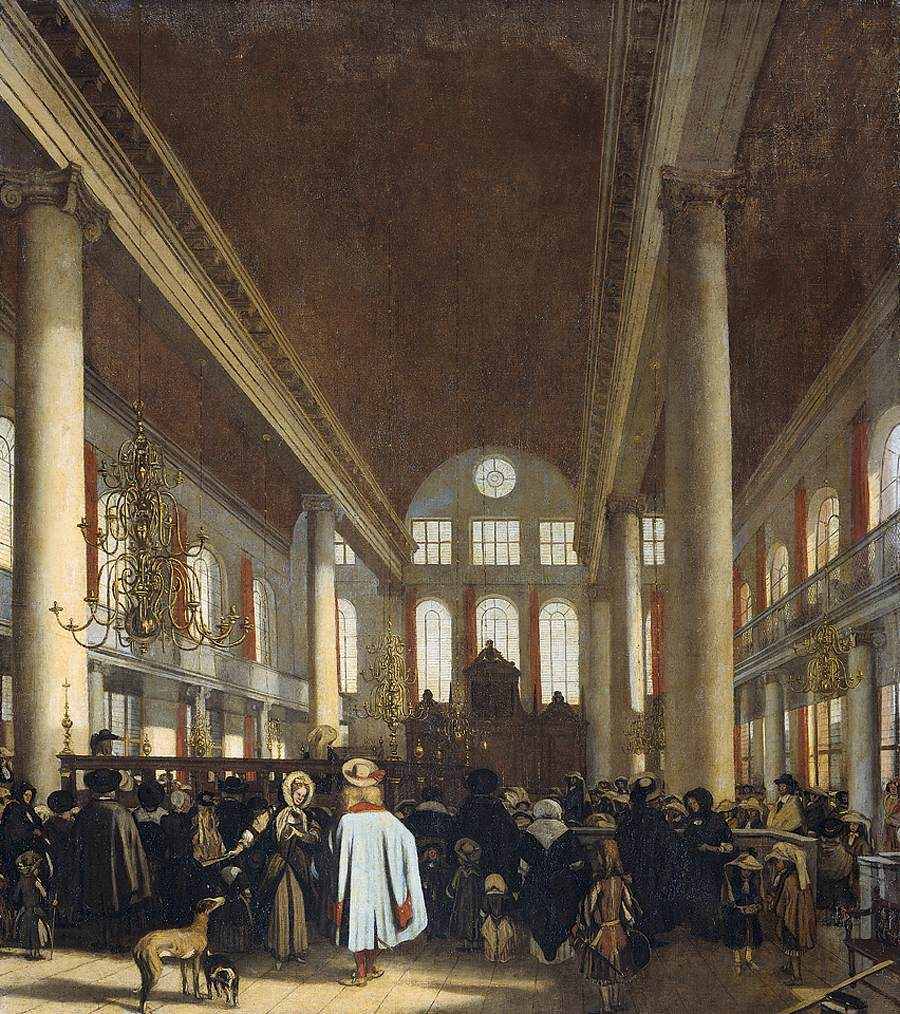
Portuguese Synagogue in Amsterdam

=== 16th–17th centuries ===
The first relevant influx of Portuguese people coming to the Netherlands was recorded in the 16th century. In fact, the first immigrants from Portugal were Sephardic Jews who settled in the Republic of the Seven United Netherlands in the sixteenth century because of the Inquisition in Portugal.

This migration was partially a consequence of the expulsion decree enacted in 1496 by the Portuguese monarchy, specifically targeting Jews and Moors residing in Portugal. The decree compelled numerous Jews to either convert to Christianity (resulting in the emergence of "Cristão-novos" – literally New Christians – and the practice of Crypto-Judaism ) or depart from the country.

Seeking enhanced religious and economic liberties, numerous crypto-Jews departed Portugal in pursuit of regions with more relaxed religious laws and promising prospects that would allow their distinctive talents to flourish. Brazil, where the European population spoke Portuguese, and France – where around 10,000 Portuguese-Jews sought refuge – became popular destinations for many. After a couple of decades, clusters of crypto-Jews began arriving in the Dutch Republic. The diaspora of Portuguese Jews across Europe, which found in liberal Netherlands one of its main destinations.

Many of the Jews who left for the Dutch provinces were crypto-Jews, persons who had converted to Catholicism but continued to practice Judaism in secret. After they had settled in the safety of the Netherlands, many of them 'returned' fully to practice of the Jewish religion.

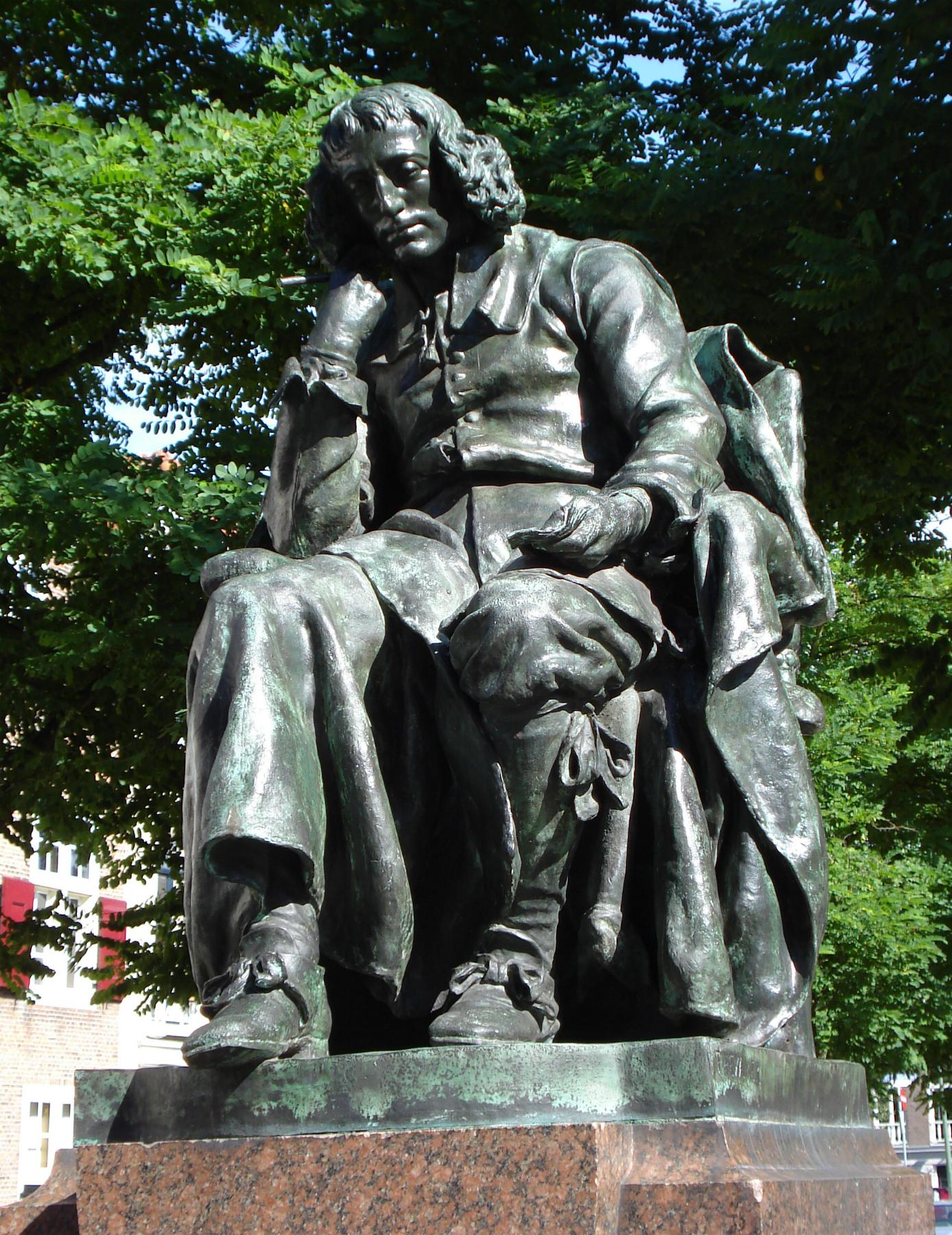
Baruch Spinoza, one of the epitomes of Western philosophy. He was of Portuguese-Jewish descent.

The Netherlands and England became in fact top destinations for Portuguese-Jewish emigrants due to the absence of the Inquisition. Other that adding to the economical and cultural aspects of their host countries, the Portuguese-Jews also established institutions that are still present, such as the Esnoga, in Amsterdam.

Amsterdam emerged as one of the most beloved locations in the Netherlands for Sephardic Jews. Due to their influx, Amsterdam experienced substantial advantages as numerous refugees were skilled merchants. Nevertheless, the decision to establish themselves in Amsterdam was not solely by choice; countless crypto-Jews, also known as Marranos, had been denied entry to trade hubs such as Middelburg and Haarlem, leading them to settle in Amsterdam. As a result of the impact made by Sephardic Jews, Amsterdam experienced rapid growth. Numerous Jewish individuals extended their support to the House of Orange, consequently receiving protection from the stadholder in return.

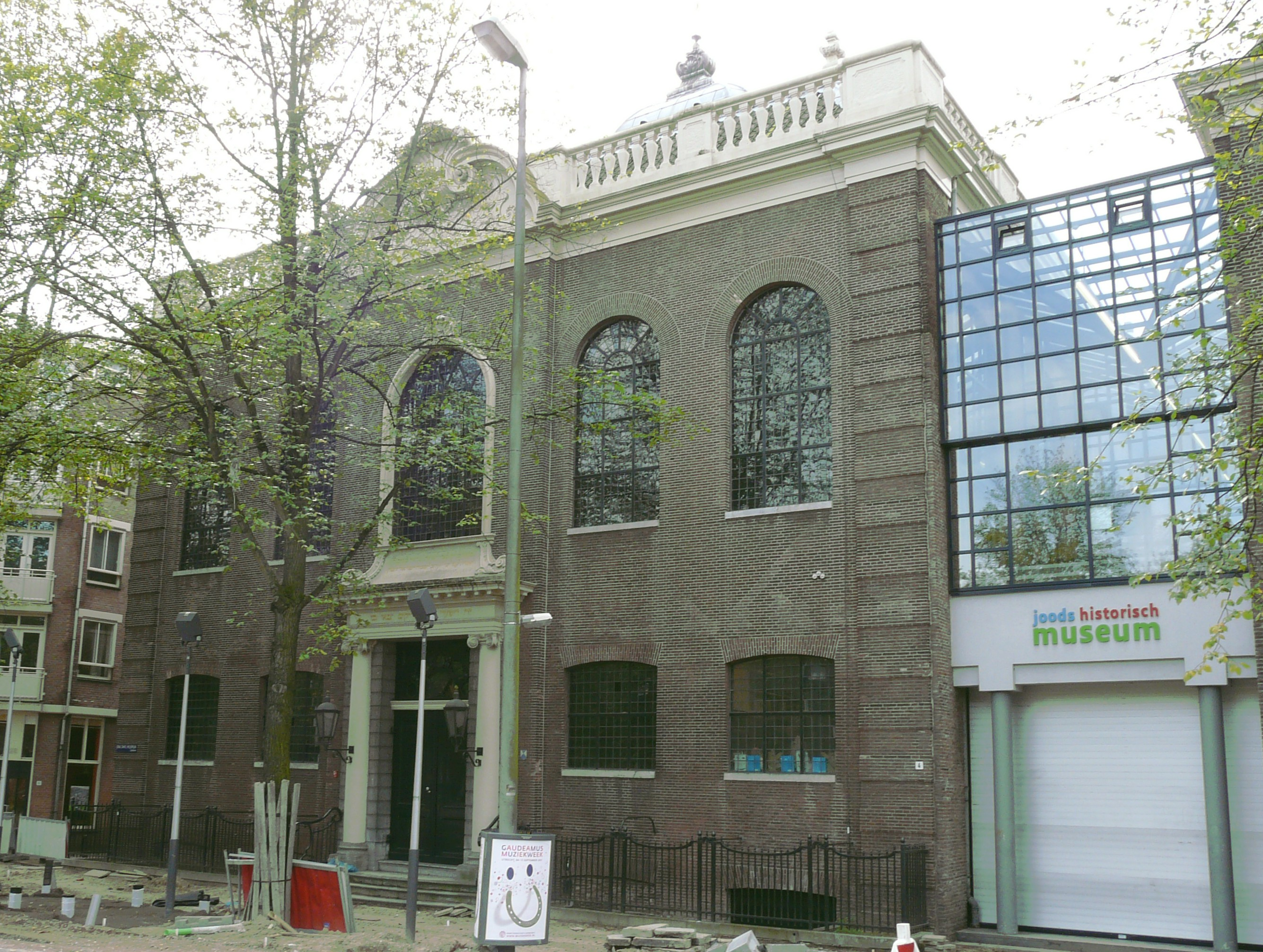
Esnoga in Amsterdam

Portuguese-Jews are connected to the expansion of the Dutch colonial empire, as they are responsible for the appearance of Papiamentu (a 300,000 speakers-strong Portuguese-based creole now official language in Aruba, Curaçao and Bonaire) and of Sranan Tongo, an English-based creole influenced by Portuguese spoken by more than 500,000 people in the former Dutch colony of Suriname. Dealing with Suriname, it is noteworthy that its first capital, Torarica (literally "rich Torah" in Portuguese), was established by Portuguese-Jewish settlers.

The Portuguese-Jewish community in the Netherlands has produced many notable figures, among which there are famous philosopher Baruch Spinoza and mathematician Rehuel Lobatto.

=== 18th–19th centuries ===
Portuguese people started arriving again as immigrants to the Netherlands in the middle of the 18th century, mostly from Madeira Island and Lisbon.

=== 20th century ===
During the Shoah, nearly 4,000 Portuguese Jews residing in the Netherlands lost their lives, making up the largest group of casualties with a Portuguese background in the Nazi German genocide. Among famous Portuguese-Jewish victims of the Shoah there are figures such as painter Baruch Lopes Leão de Laguna, composer Leo Smit or professor Juda Lion Palache.

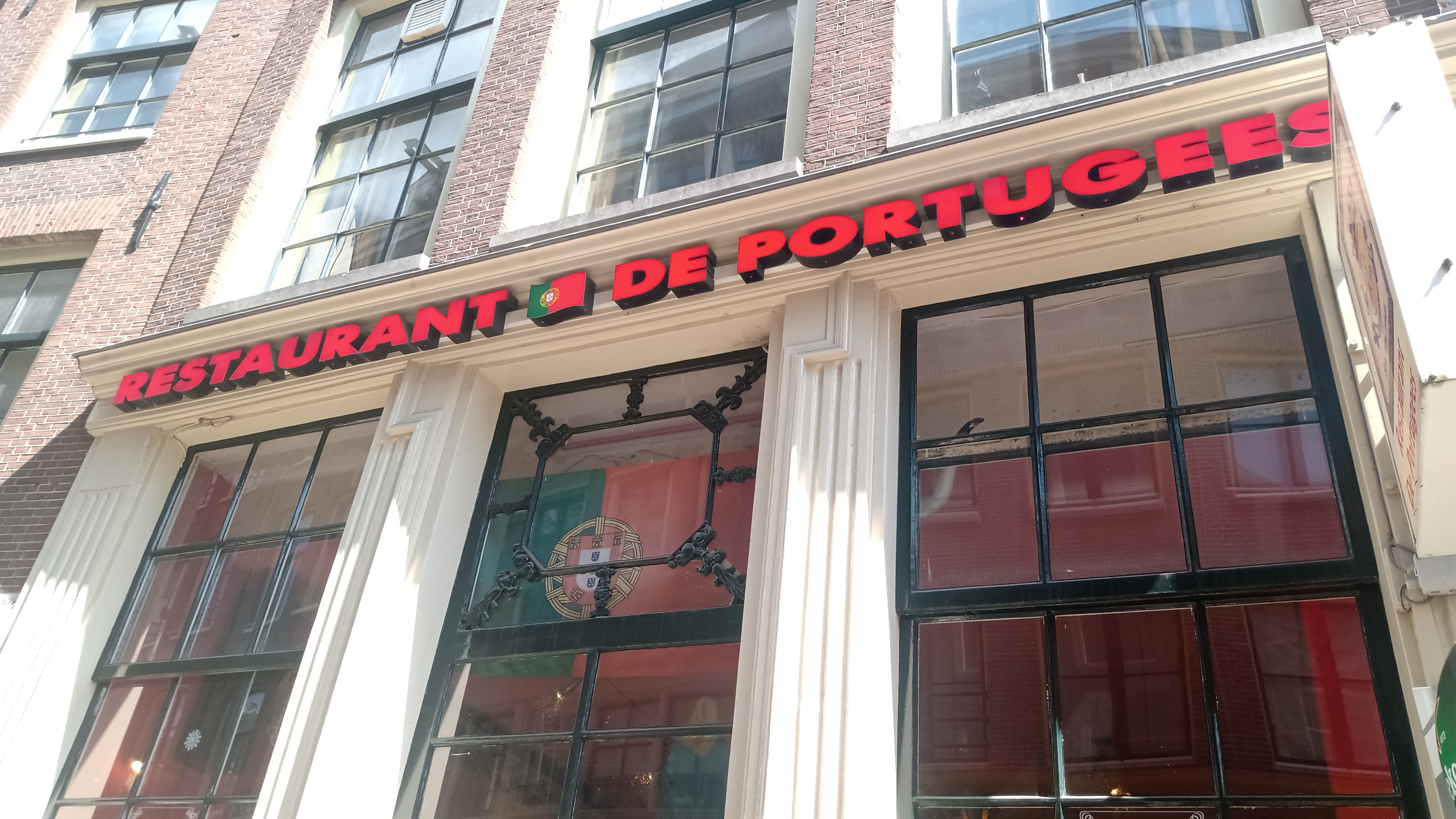
Portuguese restaurant in Amsterdam

In the 1960s, Portuguese guest workers came to work in the Netherlands.

Before 1975 Cape Verdean immigrants were registered as Portuguese immigrants from the overseas province of Portuguese Cape Verde.

The Netherlands are not among the traditional destinations chosen by Portuguese migrants, especially because of lack of linguistic affinity between the two countries. Nevertheless, starting in the late 1980s, in conjunction with the slowdown in departures towards France and the United States of America, Portuguese people have started opting for less "traditional" destinations such as Switzerland, Luxembourg and, although in lesser numbers, the Netherlands.

=== 21st century ===
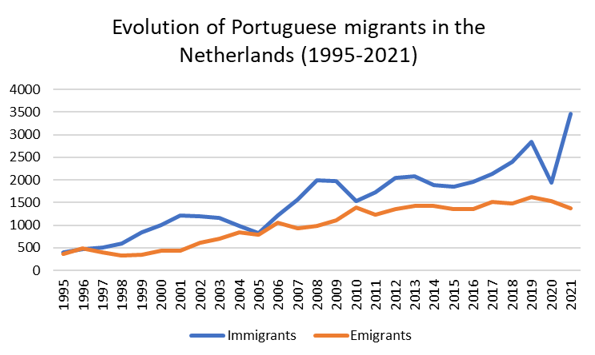
Time series of migrations involving Portuguese-born people in the Netherlands (1995–2021)

Starting from 2000 and especially since the 2008 Global recession, Portuguese have flocked to the Netherlands in great numbers. The number of Portuguese has more than doubled in the period 1996–2020 from 13,000 to more than 30,000.

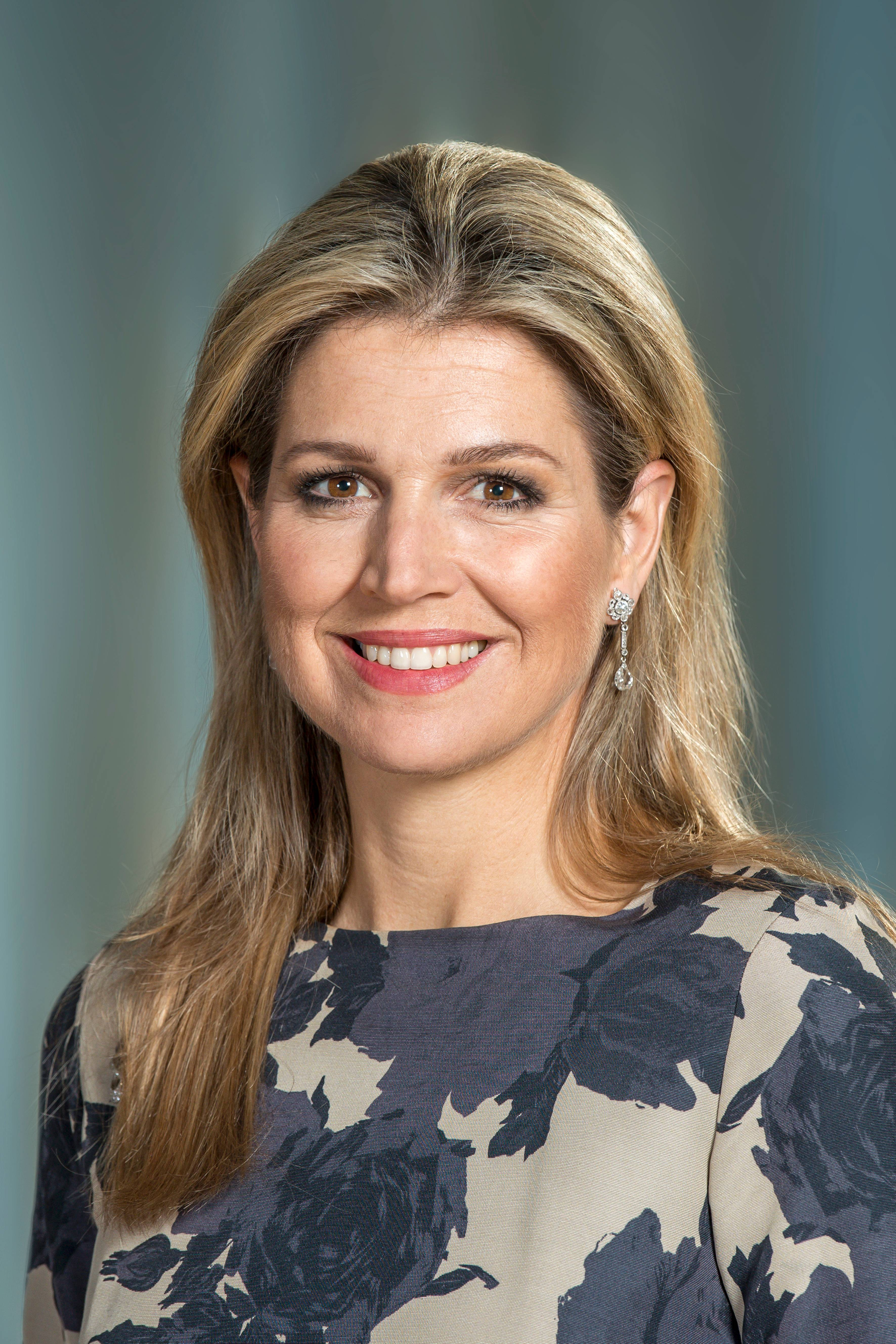
Current Queen of the Netherlands Máxima, wife of King Willem-Alexander, is of Portuguese descent through her father's side, being a descendant of King Afonso III of Portugal.

Of the almost 40,000 Portuguese that arrived in the Netherlands since 2000, 75% did so after 2008 and 58% after 2012, year in which the unemployment rate in Portugal soared to 16.1%.

Since 2006 the annual influx of individuals born in Portugal entering the Netherlands has consistently exceeded 1,000 individuals and, since 2017, more than 2,000 Portuguese have annually embarked on migration towards the Netherlands in pursuit of enhanced economic prospects. The sole exception occurred in 2020, during which a decline in the influx of Portuguese individuals was observed. This decline is most likely attributable to the COVID-19 pandemic. Moreover, the subsequent spike in the number of entries by Portuguese nationals in 2021 can be most likely partly attributed to the postponement of migration processes in the preceding year.

The Portuguese community in the Netherlands is fairly young, with 60% of the Portuguese being under 40. Moreover, among immigrants, more than 85% is under 40.

Portuguese migrants generally tend to settle for shorter periods of a few years, as opposed to permanent migrations prevalent during the 1960s great emigration movements from Portugal towards France. In fact, since 1995 26,883 Portuguese have left the Netherlands and half of them did so after 2013. Starting from 2014, the Portuguese unemployment rate has steadily fallen and the economic outlook has bettered.

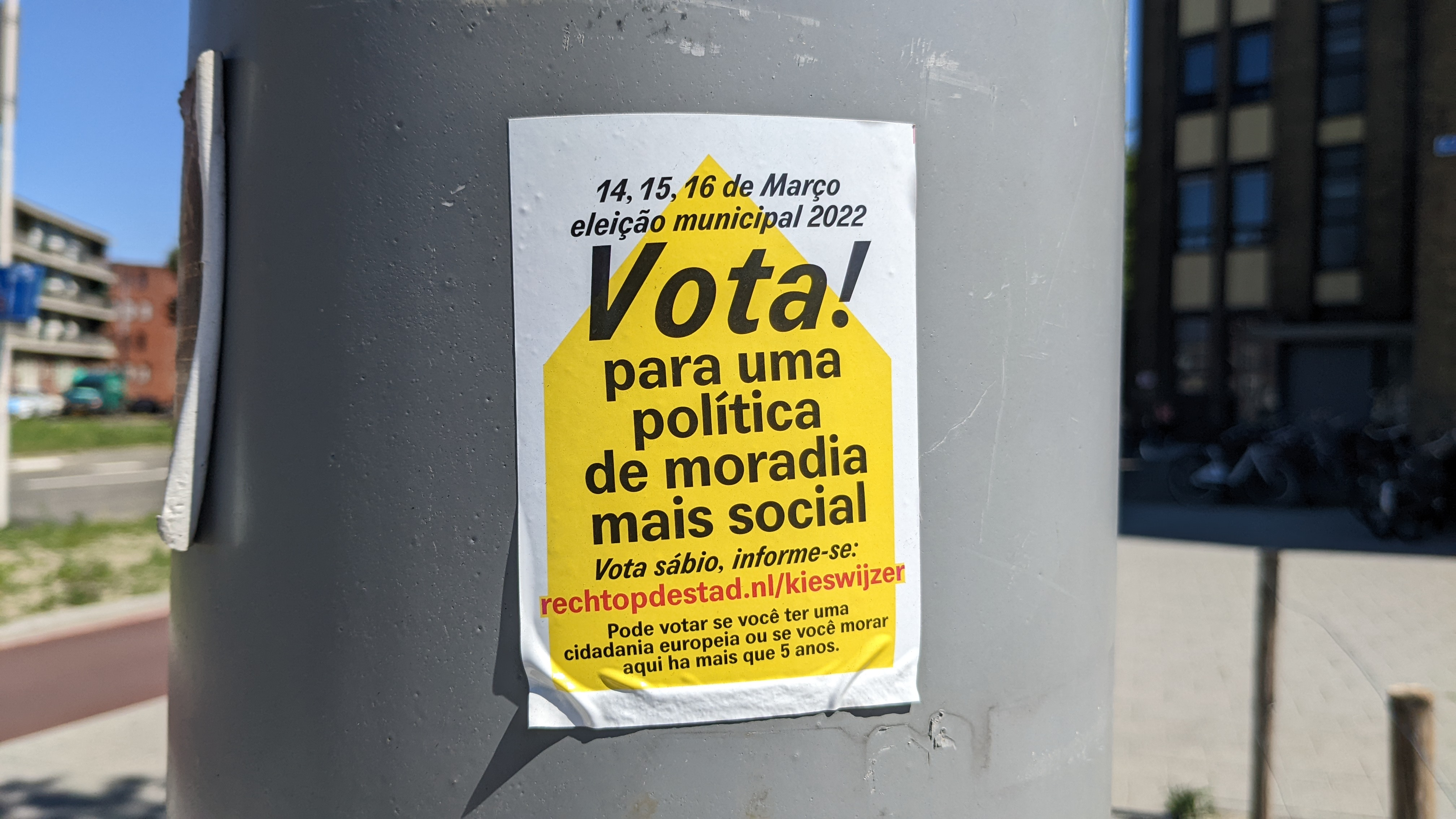
Portuguese-language political campaign sticker in Rotterdam in 2022

Dealing with the Sephardic community in the Netherlands, called the Portugees-Israëlitisch Kerkgenootschap (PIK) (Portuguese-Israelite Religious Community), it has today a membership of some 270 families (translating to approximately 600 persons), and is concentrated in Amsterdam. They constitute now some 2% of the Dutch-Jewish community. The PIK also has a youth movement, J-PIG (Jongeren Portugees-Israëlitische Gemeente – Youth Portuguese-Israelite Community).

The Portuguese are part of a wider Portuguese-speaking community in the Netherlands, comprising around 35,000 people from PALOP countries (the overwhelming majority being from Angola or from Cape Verde), Timor-Leste or Macau and 76,500 Brazilians. People from CPLP countries thus number around 147,500 people, accounting for 0.84% of the population of the Netherlands. The Netherlands is the Benelux country with the smallest community of people coming from CPLP countries: In Belgium there are around 156,000 people (1.33% of the population) while in Luxembourg there are over 150,000 Portuguese alone.

== Demographics ==
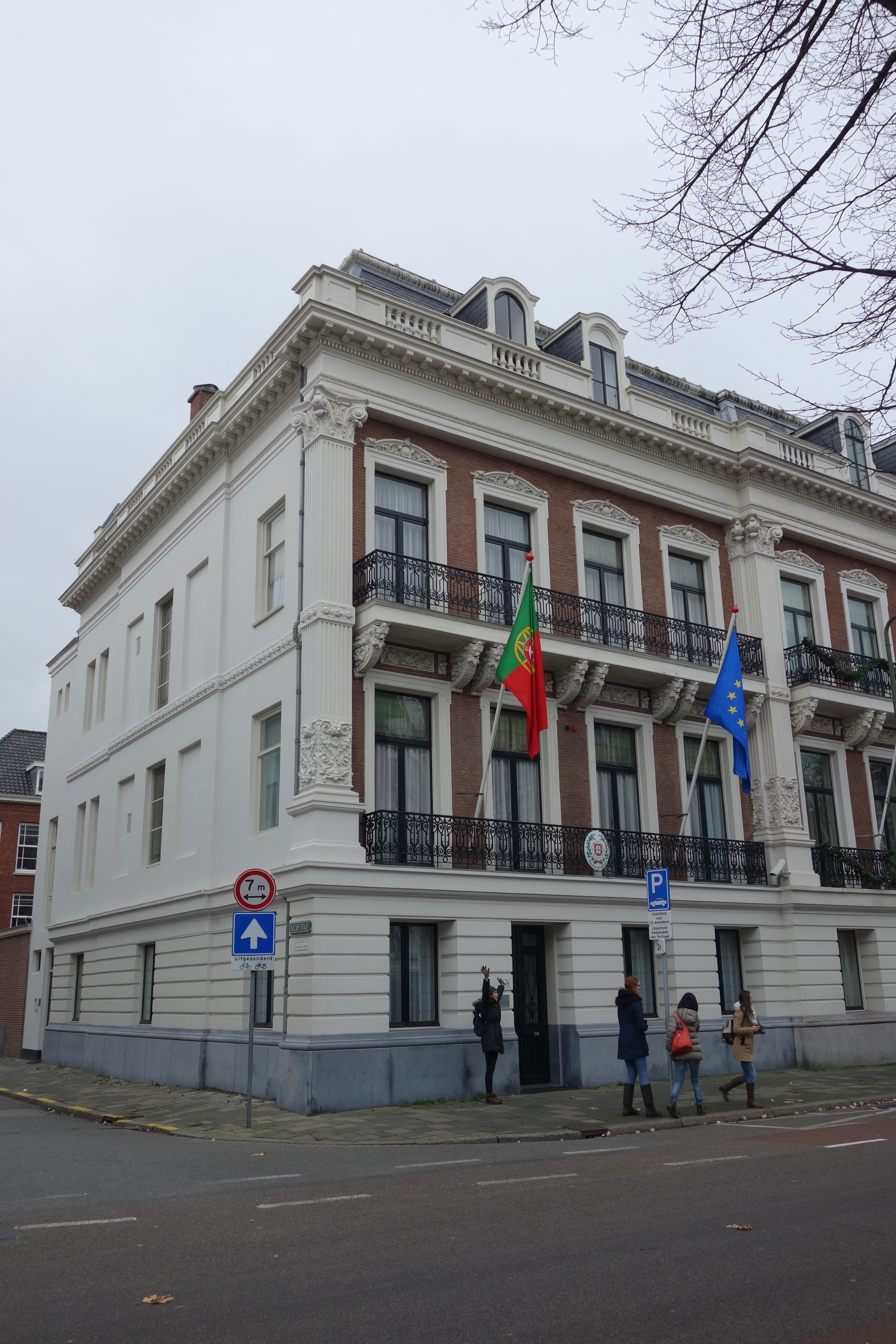
Portuguese embassy in the Netherlands

According to Portuguese registers, in 2022 around 35,800 Portuguese citizens are registered as living in the Netherlands. Meanwhile, as of 2022, over 31,000 of Dutch people are of Portuguese descent, meaning people born in Portugal or children of at least one Portuguese-born parent. The number of people of Portuguese background is lower than that of Portuguese nationals because many Portuguese may have been born in third countries such as France, Luxembourg, Belgium or Germany, countries neighbourhing the Netherlands and all having large Portuguese populations.

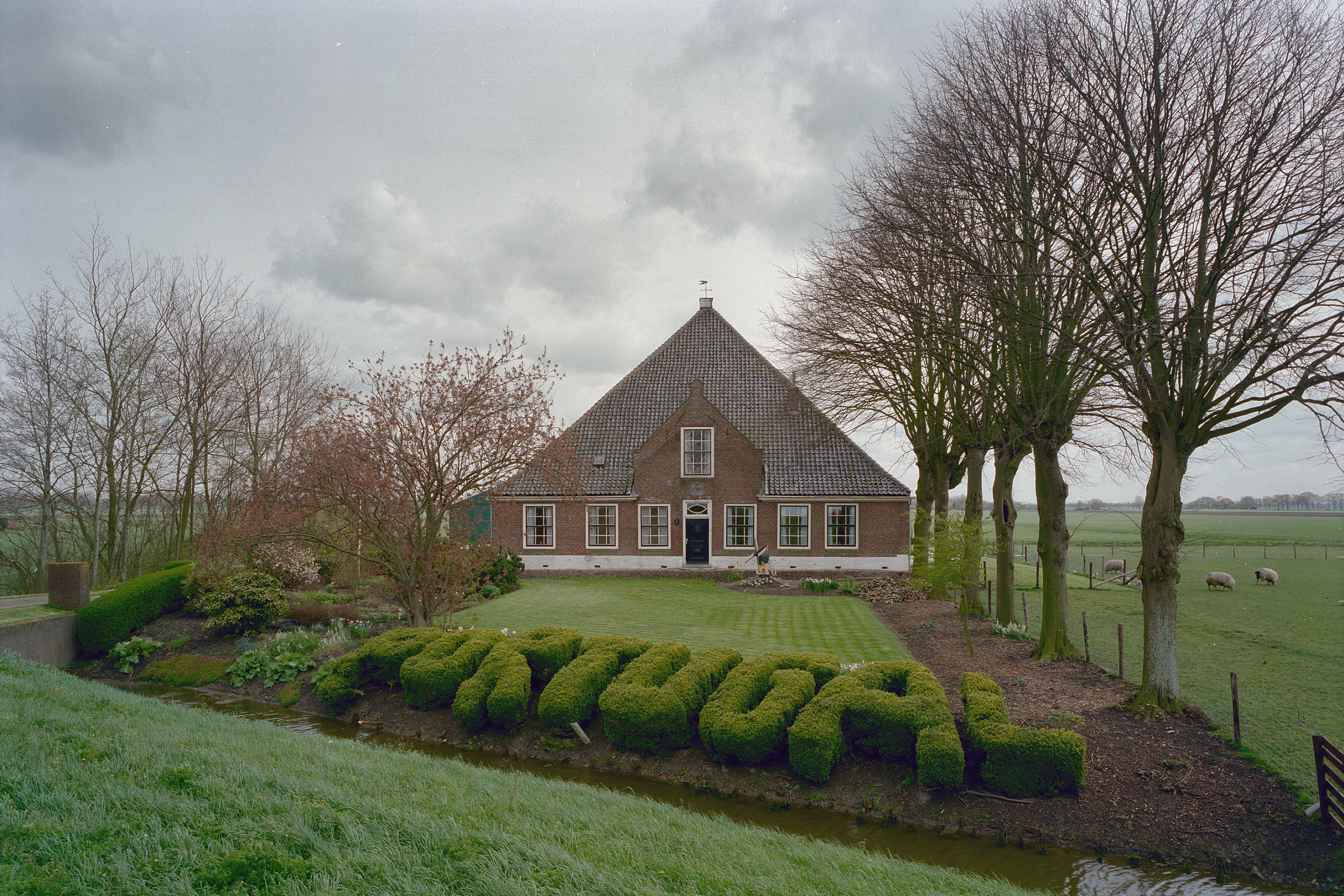
Portugal farm, national monument from 1780

The Portuguese did not acquire in significant amount Dutch citizenship due to their status as EU citizens. In fact, according to Dutch legislation, an individual may possess only one nationality. Therefore, many Portuguese are unwilling to renounce their Portuguese citizenship. Interestingly, since the year 2000, only 1,620 Portuguese nationals have been naturalized as Dutch citizens, which accounts for a mere 0.2% of the total number of naturalizations. However, the Portuguese represent 1.2% of the foreign population, meaning they are under-represented in the naturalization process.

The Portuguese community in the Netherlands retains strong ties with its homeland and, between 2000 and 2021, it has sent more than €700 million to Portugal in remittances. In the same timeframe, Dutch people in Portugal (numbering around 12,100 individuals) have sent approximately 42.43 million euros (€) to the Netherlands.

Population development of the Portuguese in the Netherlands
Year	1996	2000	2005	2010	2015	2020	2021
First generation	8 759	9 509	11 833	14 356	16 456	19 820	21 735
Second generation	4 198	4 772	5 723	6 625	7 786	8 982	9 571
Number of Portuguese	12 957	14 281	17 556	20 981	24 242	28 802	31 306

In 2021, about 16.4% of the Portuguese in the Netherlands were between 0 and 15 years old, or a total of 5,141 people. Of these 5,141 persons, 1,179 children belonged to the first generation of Portuguese and 3,962 children to the second generation. In contrast, about 6.6% of the Portuguese in the Netherlands were 65 years or older, or 2,067 persons in total with 99.3% of them being first generation migrants. This means that the Portuguese in the Netherlands are younger than the Portuguese in Portugal itself.

== Notable people ==
- Isaac Aboab da Fonseca (1605–1693): a rabbi, scholar, kabbalist and writer. In 1656, he was one of several elders within the Portuguese-Israelite community in the Netherlands who excommunicated Baruch Spinoza
- Frieda Belinfante (1904–1995): Dutch cellist, philharmonic conductor, a prominent lesbian, and a member of the Dutch resistance during World War II
- Cláudio Braga (1974): Portuguese football manager who has worked in the Netherlands
- Abraham Caceres (1718–1740): Dutch composer of the late baroque period
- Abraham Capadose (1795–1874): Dutch physician and Calvinist writer
- Isaac Orobio de Castro (1617–1687): Portuguese Jewish philosopher, physician and religious apologist
- Isaac Cohen Belinfante (1720–1781): poet, bibliophile, and magid in Amsterdam
- Isaäc da Costa (1798–1860): a Jewish poet
- Jacques Franco-Mendès (1816–1899): Dutch composer
- Jan Gildemeester (1744–1799): art collector
- Danny Henriques (1997): Portuguese footballer born in the Netherlands to Portuguese migrants
- Baruch Lopes Leão de Laguna (1864–1943): Dutch painter
- Rehuel Lobatto (1797–1866): Dutch mathematician whose notable contributions include Gauss-Lobatto quadrature method and the Lobatto polynomials
- Francisco Lopes Suasso (1657–1710): banker and financier of the Dutch Republic
- Aron Mendes Chumaceiro (1810–1882): Hakham of Curaçao, in the former Dutch West Indies
- Romy Monteiro (1992): Dutch singer
- Fatima Moreira de Melo (1978): Dutch field hockey player
- Solomon de Oliveyra (1633–1708): Dutch rabbi, poet, and philologist
- Abraham Pais (1918–2000): Dutch-American physicist and science historian
- Arie Pais (1930–2022): Dutch politician
- Juda Lion Palache (1886–1944): professor of Semitic languages (Hebrew, Arabic, Aramaic) at the University of Amsterdam and a leader of the Portuguese Jewish community in that city. He came from the Pallache family
- Luís Pedro (1990): Dutch professional footballer
- Fernando Pereira (1950–1985): Portuguese-Dutch freelance photographer, who drowned when French intelligence (DGSE) detonated a bomb and sank the Rainbow Warrior, owned by the environmental organisation Greenpeace on 10 July 1985
- Isaac de Pinto (1717–1787): Dutch merchant and banker
- Ruben Roosken (2000): Dutch footballer
- Samuel Sarphati (1813–1866): Dutch physician and Amsterdam city planner
- Leo Smit (1900–1943) : Dutch composer
- Pedrinho Sousa (1990): Dutch footballer from Willemstad, Curaçao
- Baruch Spinoza (1632–1677): Dutch philosopher of Portuguese-Jewish origin
- Alexander Teixeira de Mattos (1865–1921): Dutch-English journalist, literary critic and publisher, who gained his greatest fame as a translator
- Virgilio Teixeira (1973): retired Dutch–Portuguese footballer
- Fernando Venâncio (1944): Portuguese-born writer, intellectual, literary critic, linguist and academic
- Jacob ben Abraham Zaddiq (17th century): Portuguese-Jewish banker and merchant

== See also ==
- Netherlands–Portugal relations
- Portuguese diaspora
- Immigration to the Netherlands
- Portuguese synagogue of Amsterdam
- Portuguese in Belgium
- Portuguese in Denmark
- Portuguese in Germany
- Portuguese in Luxembourg
- History of the Jews in Affaltrach
- History of the Jews in Hamburg
- Portuguese Jewish community in Hamburg
