= Belgium–Portugal relations =

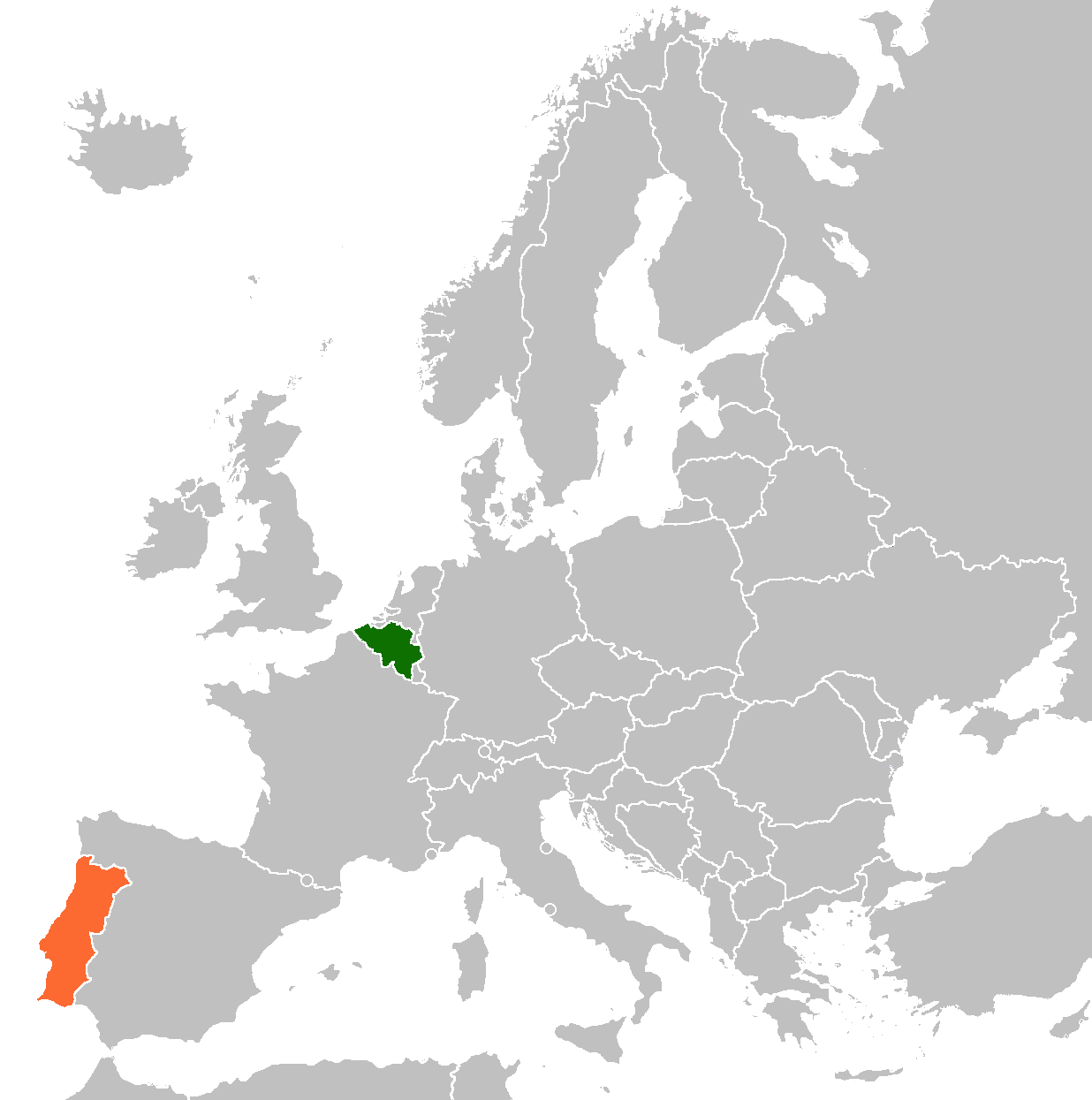
- Belgium: Portugal

Diplomatic mission
- Embassy of Belgium, Lisbon: Embassy of Portugal, Brussels

Belgium–Portugal relations are the current and historical relations between Belgium and Portugal. Both nations are members of the Council of Europe, European Union, NATO, Organisation for Economic Co-operation and Development, Union for the Mediterranean and the United Nations.

== History ==
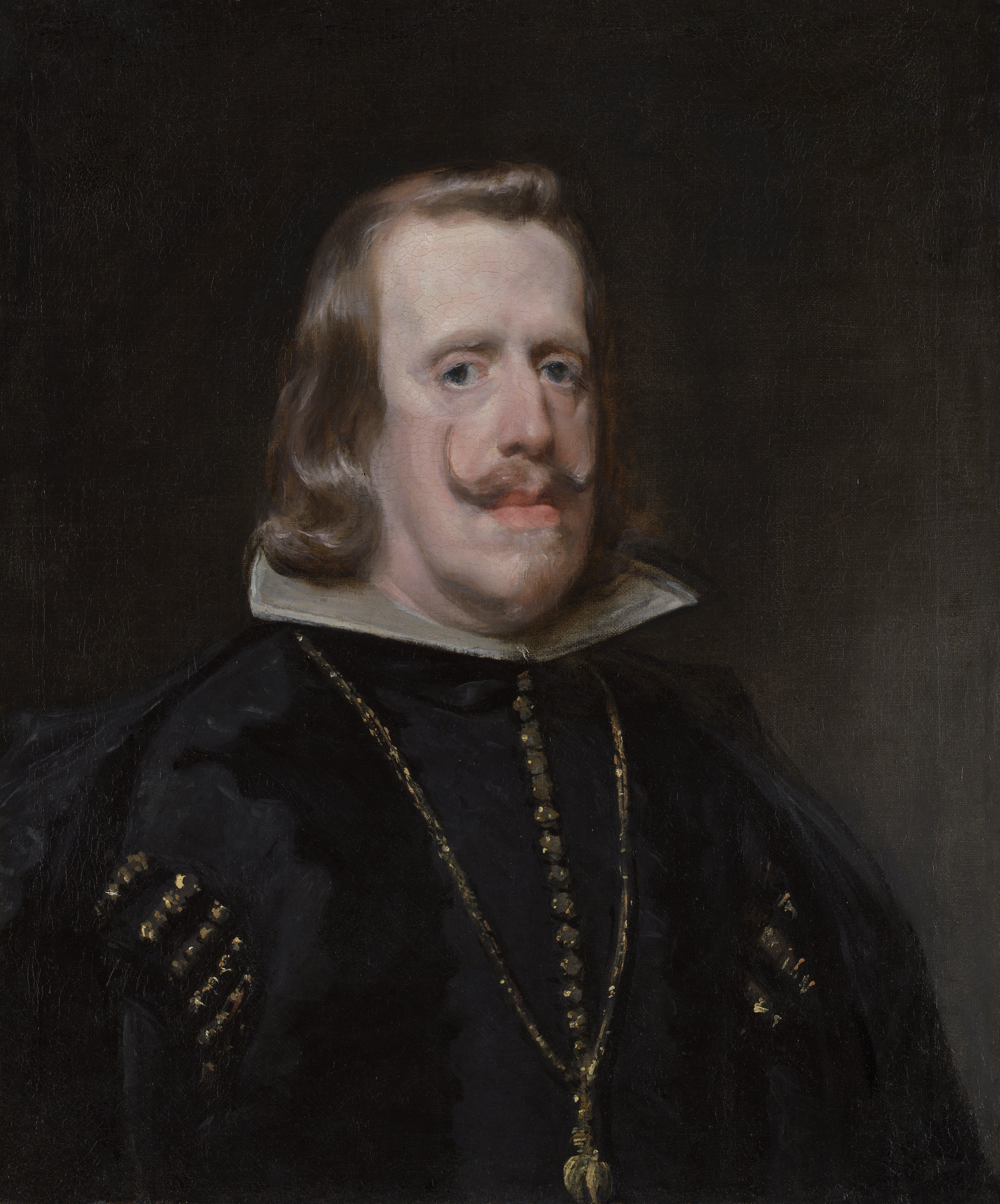
King Philip IV of Spain also ruled Belgium and Portugal

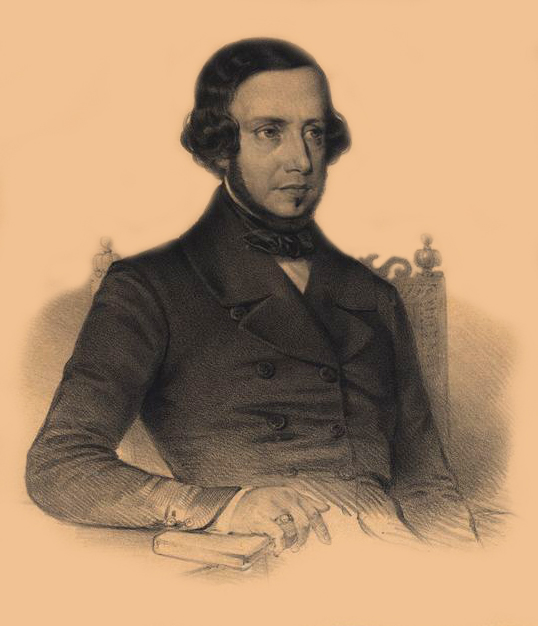
The writer Almeida Garrett became the first Portuguese ambassador to Belgium in 1834

Due to their relative geographical proximity, Portugal and Belgium maintain a friendly and lasting relationship that originates from the medieval period, when Antwerp and Bruges were important trading ports. Portugal established trading posts there, which became particularly important for the trade of goods from across the Portuguese Empire to the European market.

Of particular note during the Renaissance period is the celebrated Portuguese humanist Damião de Góis, who resided in Flanders, more specifically in Antwerp, before completing his studies at the University of Leuven in Belgium.

Diplomatic relations were established on 20 February 1834 when a chargé d'affaires was established from Belgium to Portugal by C. Serruys. Contacts between the two nations were renewed, notably with the opening of the Portuguese Legation in Brussels in 1834, whose first holder, as chargé d'affaires, was Almeida Garrett, one of the greatest figures of Portuguese Romanticism. On 16 November 1910, Belgium recognized Portugal's new republican regime, being one of the first European states to do so.

During the World War I, both countries were part of the Allied powers and eventual victors of the conflict, with Portuguese participation standing out in the defense of the Franco-Belgian border, culminating in the Battle of the Lys, which took place mostly in territory that now belongs to Belgium.

Both countries remained neutral during World War II. However, Belgium suffered German occupation in 1940, while Portugal subsequently became a refuge for displaced persons. Among the numerous refugees who fled from Belgium to Portugal were also well-known figures, such as Otto von Habsburg, who was sentenced to death in Nazi Germany and was able to escape to safety with a visa issued by the Portuguese consul, Aristides de Sousa Mendes.

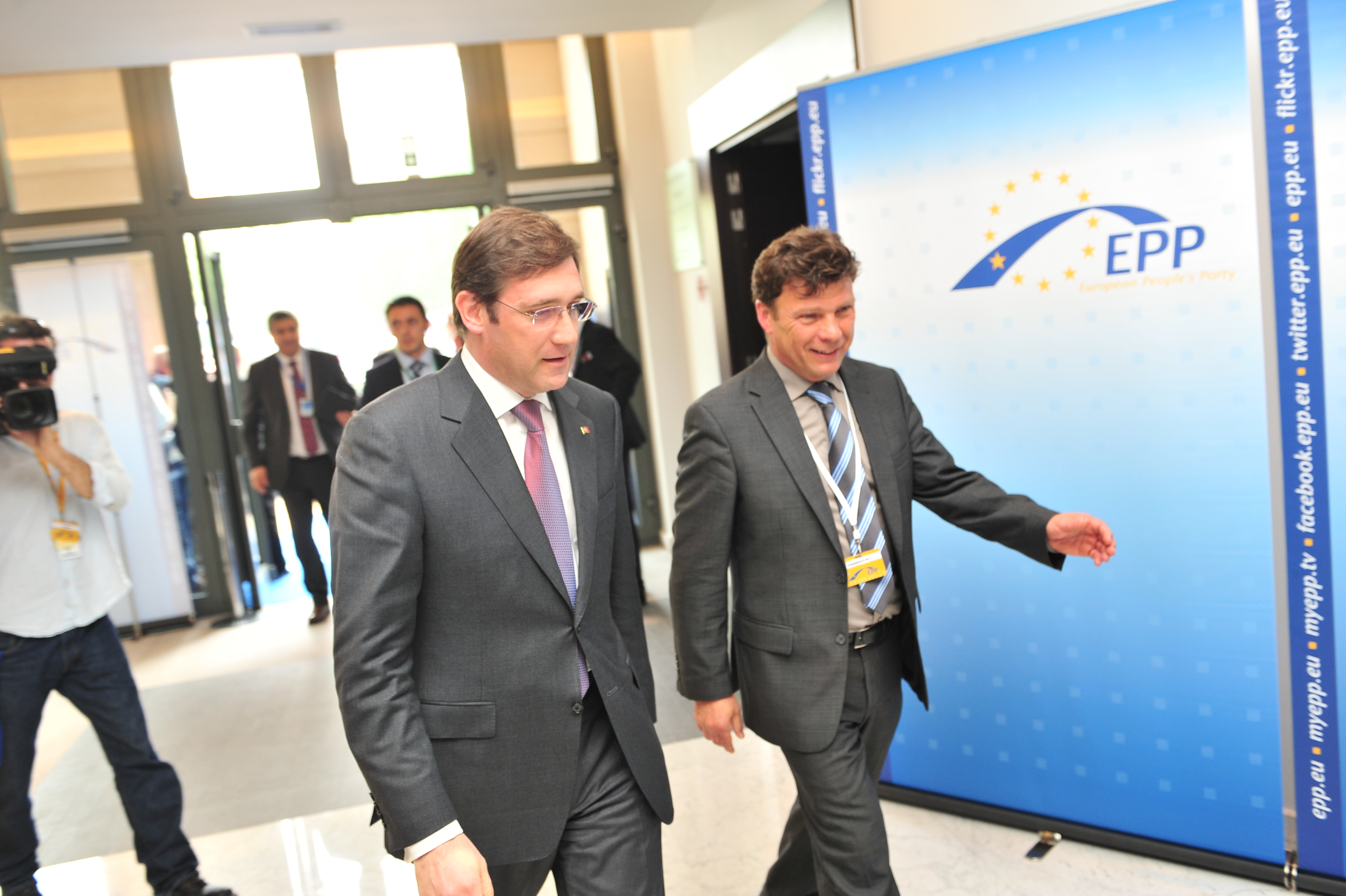
Portugal's Passos Coelho (left) and Belgium's Luc Vandeputte (right) at the 2012 EPP summit.

Following the hasty independence of the Belgian colony in 1960, some Belgian military personnel cooperated in the Portuguese fight against the rising independence movements. In return, Portuguese citizens from Angola also went to the now independent, and initially economically booming, neighboring country, including the later Portuguese physician and human rights activist Fernando Nobre.

With the continued economic growth in Belgium, increasing numbers of Portuguese guest workers came to the country from the 1960s onwards, alleviating the labor shortage there and fleeing the underdeveloped and aurimite-ruled Portugal under dictator Salazar.

Since Portugal's entry into the present European Union in 1986, whose predecessor Belgium co-founded in 1951, bilateral relations have intensified.

Following the democratic transition in Portugal, and with Portugal's accession to the European Union, the bilateral relationship between the two countries was strengthened, characterized by shared values and cooperative relations woven within the European and international multilateral agenda. Several official visits by government officials from both countries took place after 1974, the date of the Portuguese democratic transition.

== International organizations ==
While Belgium is one of the founding members of the European Union, Portugal became a member in 1986. Both countries are founding members of NATO.

== Resident diplomatic missions ==
- Belgium has an embassy in Lisbon.
- Portugal has an embassy in Brussels.

== See also ==
- Foreign relations of Belgium
- Foreign relations of Portugal
- Portuguese in Belgium
