= Netherlands–Portugal relations =

- Netherlands: Portugal

Netherlands–Portugal relations are the bilateral relations between the Netherlands and Portugal. Both countries are full members of the Council of Europe, the European Union and NATO. The Netherlands has an embassy in Lisbon and 3 honorary consulates (in Faro, Funchal and Ponta Delgada), while Portugal has an embassy in The Hague.

Relations between the two countries date back as early as the 17th century, when the Kingdom of Portugal sent its first ambassador, Tristão de Mendonça Furtado, to the United Provinces of the Netherlands in 1641.

The Dutch Portuguese Chamber of Commerce, a non-profit organization that promotes business relationships between Portugal and the Netherlands, was created by Dutch companies in collaboration with the Dutch Ministry of Economic Affairs following Portugal's admission to the EU in 1986.

== History ==
=== Early history ===
During the Reconquista against the Arabs who had ruled Portugal since 711, crusaders from what is now the Netherlands were also among the knights who helped to establish the independent Christian kingdom of Portugal, particularly during the siege of Lisbon in 1147.

Even before that, but especially with Portugal's increasing trade in the 15th century, the country also exported to the Netherlands, especially wine and fruit. In the opposite direction, cultural and social impulses increasingly came to Portugal from the Netherlands, such as the influence of Early Netherlandish painting on Portuguese artists.

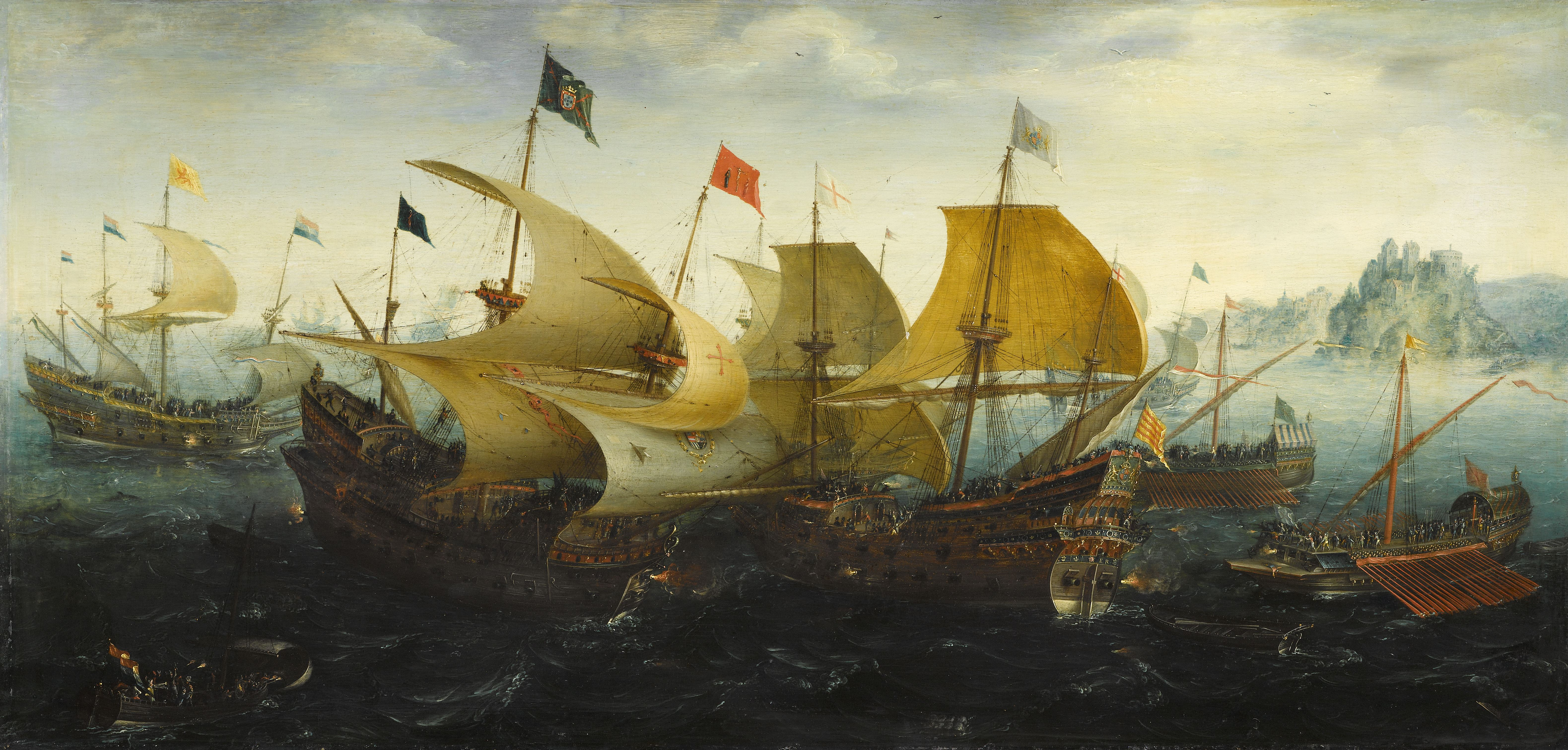
Portuguese galleon fighting Dutch and English warships in the Dutch–Portuguese War

The relations began to be overshadowed by conflict when, after the emergence of the Portuguese Empire, the now also emerging Dutch colonial empire sought to acquire the previously exclusive knowledge of the Portuguese and, in particular through Dutch cartographers such as Jan Huygen van Linschoten in Portuguese service, slowly gained enough knowledge itself to interfere in the profitable overseas trade. From 1602, the Dutch East India Company took effective action in what is now Indonesia against the Portuguese, who were weakened by their personal union with Spain. As a result, they became increasingly serious competitors, and both countries became increasingly involved in conflicts in Africa (Angola, Maputo Bay, Gold Coast, São Tomé, etc.) and Brazil (with short rule of John Maurice, Prince of Nassau-Siegen), but above all in Asia (naval battle at Jask in 1620, siege of Colombo in 1655/66). The Dutch-Portuguese War (1624–1661), which led to the loss of large parts of the Portuguese possessions in Asia to the Netherlands on the one hand, but also to the assertion of the Portuguese presence in South America and West Africa with the defense against Dutch ambitions in Brazil, is particularly noteworthy.

In addition to the military successes, the influx of Sephardic Jews from Iberia was another decisive factor in the rise of the Netherlands as a major trading power. These Jewish families who had fled Portugal had mostly been active in international trade there and now brought their knowledge, trade connections and wealth with them to the Dutch cities, where they settled, especially in Amsterdam. Amsterdam's Portuguese Synagogue, inaugurated in 1675, bears witness to this time, traces of which can still be seen today and which, despite all the economic and political conflicts, also brought Portugal and the Netherlands closer together. In particular, the common opposition to Spain ensured better relations. As part of its foreign policy efforts during the War of Restoration (restoration of its independence after the Iberian Union), Portugal also renewed its diplomatic relations with the Netherlands. In February 1641, Tristão de Mendonça Furtado accredited himself as the first Portuguese representative to the Republic of the United Netherlands, which itself had to defend itself against the Spanish during the Eighty Years' War.

There were also numerous other moments of Dutch-Portuguese rapprochement, such as when the high nobility of both countries intermarried (for example Manuel of Portugal at the end of the 16th century), or when Dutch merchant families settled in Portugal, including the Niepoort family, now known as port wine producers, who arrived in Portugal in the mid-19th century.

=== After the 19th Century ===
As the Portuguese colonial empire declined from the 18th century onwards, the conflicts decreased. Only on the island of Timor in the east of the Dutch Indies, the eastern half of which remained Portuguese, did tension persist. Although they were able to settle their territorial disagreements in the Treaty of Lisbon in 1859, their relations here did not completely normalize even after minor adjustments to their agreement in 1902. For example, after the end of the Portuguese monarchy (proclamation of the First Portuguese Republic in 1910, recognition by the Netherlands on September 12, 1911), the Dutch campaigned among the insecure East Timorese for their Queen Wilhelmina as the more reliable protecting power, and during the First World War, the Dutch made threatening gestures against the Portuguese security forces in East Timor. The emerging independence movement in the Dutch East Indies then ensured a calmer phase between West and East Timor.

Although Portugal remained neutral during the Second World War, Portuguese Timor was nevertheless invaded by Dutch and Australian forces in 1941 in order to forestall a Japanese invasion. The Salazar regime protested against this. At the Battle of Timor in 1942, Japan conquered East Timor and a bloody guerrilla war ensued. After the end of the Second World War, the Netherlands and Australia unsuccessfully tried to prevent the return of East Timor to Portuguese rule.

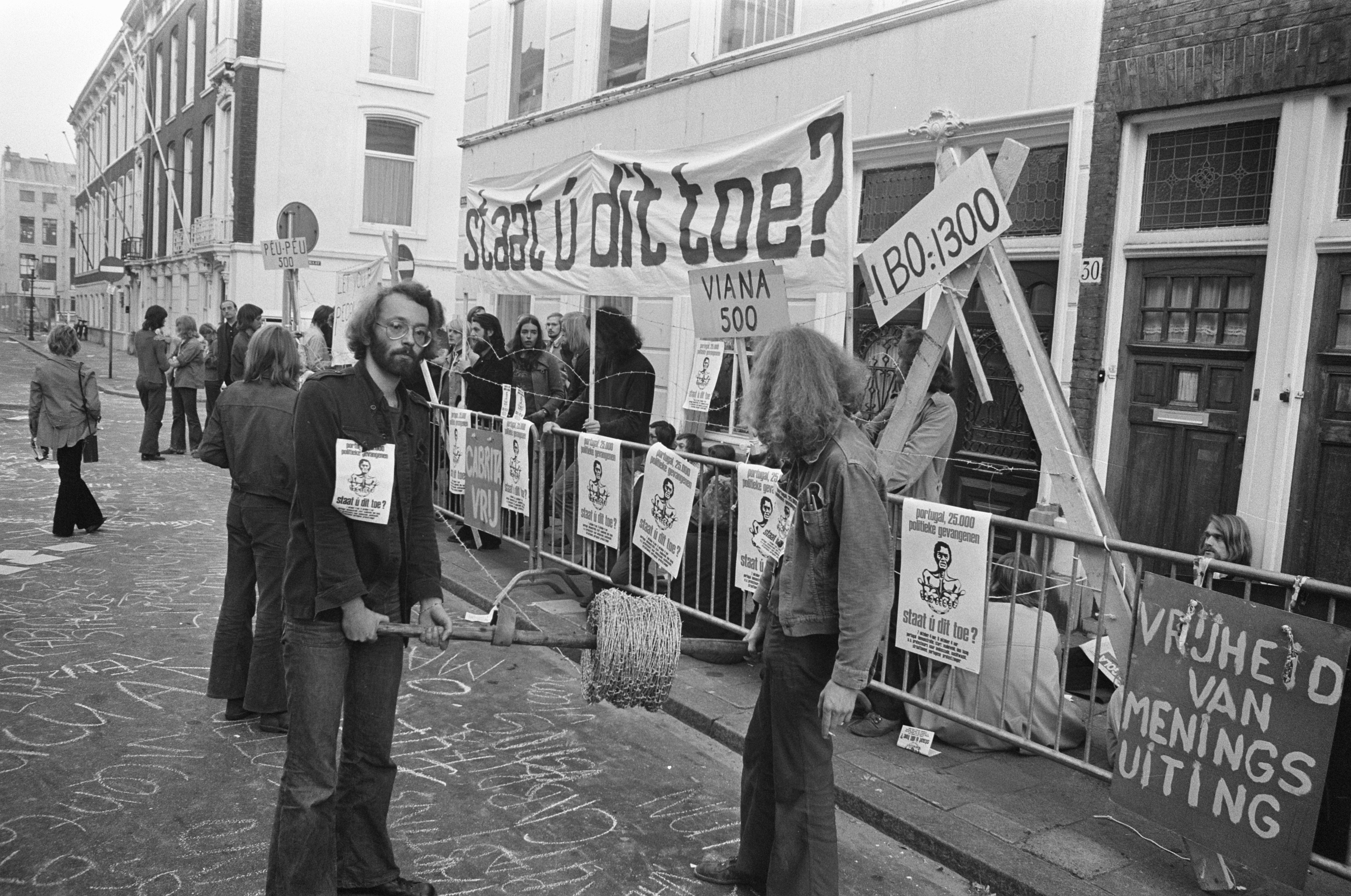
Protests in the Netherlands against political prisoners in Portugal, October 1972.

Indonesia became independent in 1949, which also put an end to the differences between the two countries in Timor. Only the Dutch rejection of the authoritarian Estado Novo regime and support for the independence movements in the Portuguese territories in Africa remained as disagreements in official Dutch-Portuguese relations, especially after the outbreak of the Portuguese colonial wars from 1961.

After the Carnation Revolution in Portugal in 1974 and the subsequent end of the Salazar dictatorship, the relationship between the Netherlands and Portugal, which had returned to democracy, changed fundamentally, especially after the democratic forces prevailed in the 1975 revolution and Portugal now clearly committed itself to European integration. The emigration of Portuguese to the Netherlands that began in the 1960s intensified in the 1970s, and political relations as well as cultural exchange became more intense. As one of many signs of the good relations, the Dutch embassy took on representative tasks for Portugal in East Timor, which was annexed by Indonesia in 1975 against Portugal's protest, and issued Portuguese passports to political refugees.

Since Portugal's accession to the EEC (now the EU) in 1986, the two countries have continued to grow closer. Since then, their economic relations have grown considerably, as have mutual migration, tourism and civil society exchanges in areas such as culture, science, environmental protection, energy, youth organizations and sport. Most recently, the common interest in the further development of renewable energies was the subject of joint consultations, in particular their Memorandum of Understanding on cooperation in the field of green hydrogen signed in 2020.

== The European Union and NATO ==
While the Netherlands was one of the founding members of the European Union (EU), Portugal joined the European Union (EU) in 1986. Both countries were founding members of NATO.

== Resident diplomatic missions ==
- the Netherlands has an embassy in Lisbon.
- Portugal has an embassy in The Hague.
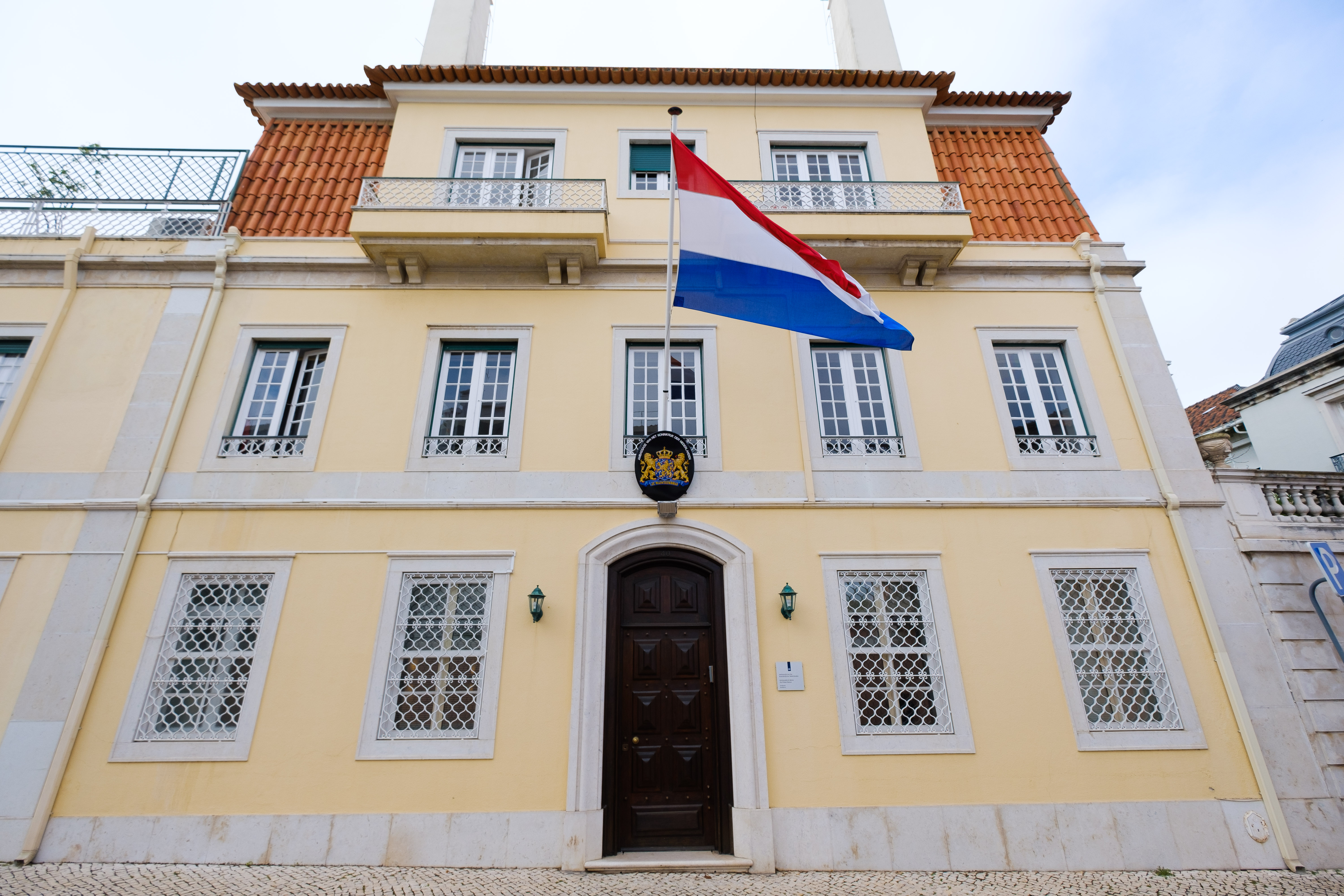
Embassy of the Netherlands in Lisbon

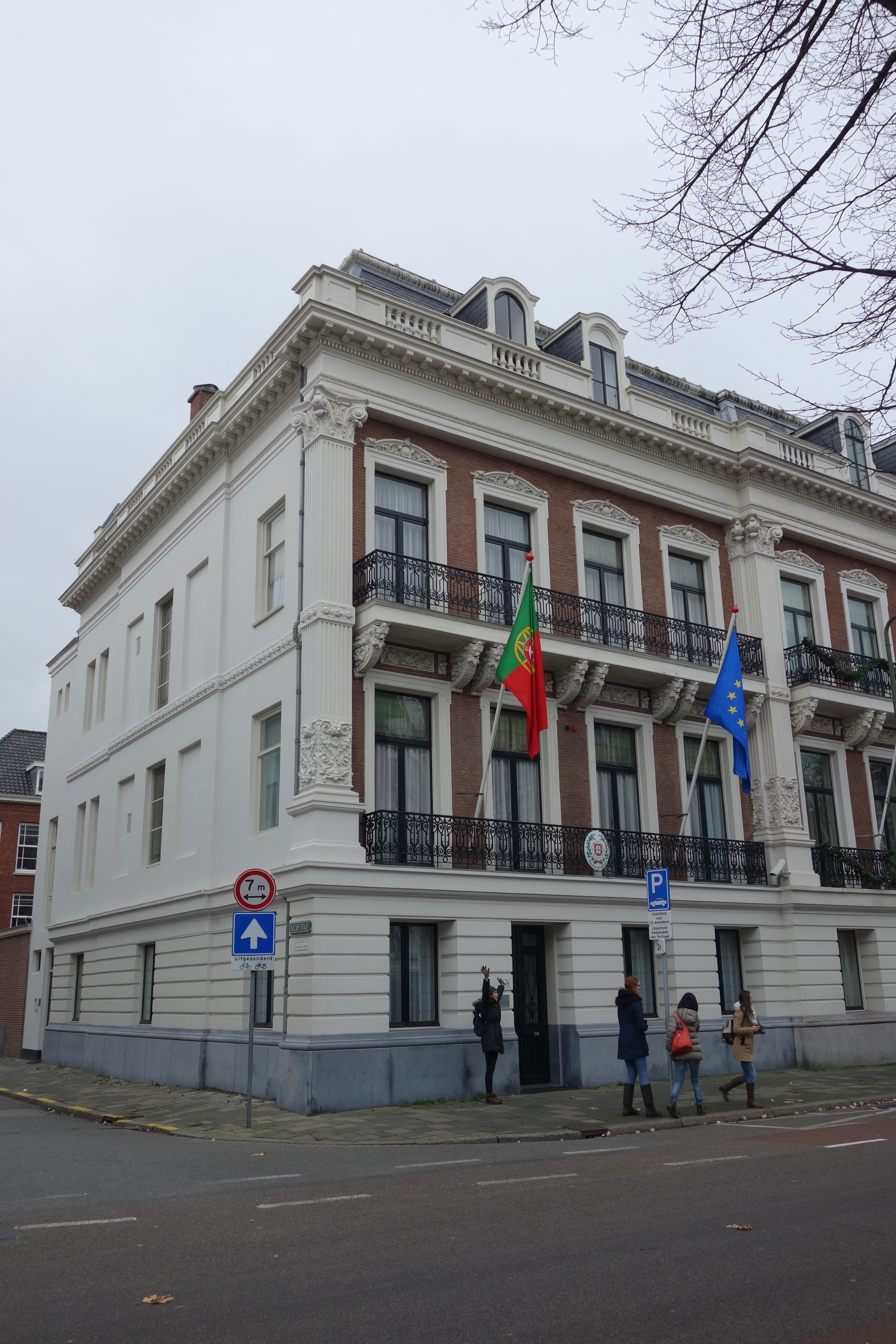
Embassy of Portugal in The Hague

== See also ==
- Foreign relations of the Netherlands
- Foreign relations of Portugal
- Portuguese in the Netherlands
- Dutchs in Portugal
