= Obersulm =

- Municipality
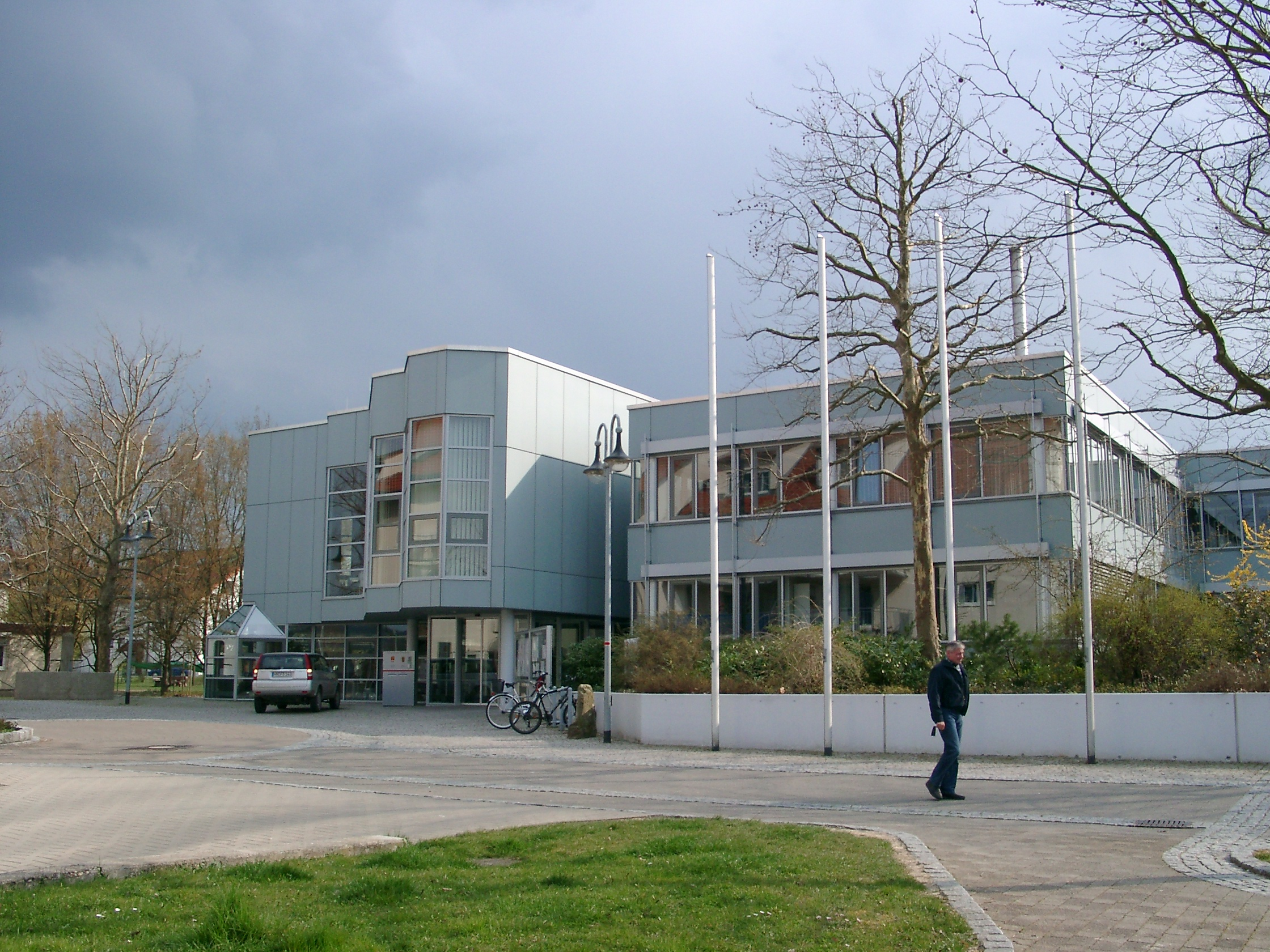
- Town hall in Obersulm-Affaltrach

- Coat of arms

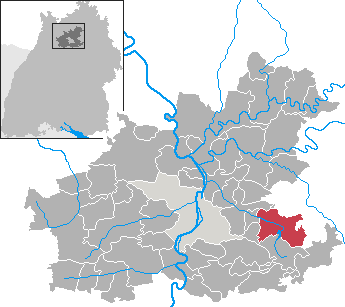
- Location of Obersulm within Heilbronn district
- Interactive map of Obersulm
- Location within Germany Location within Baden-Württemberg
- Coordinates: 49°8′N 9°23′E
- Country: Germany
- State: Baden-Württemberg
- Admin. region: Stuttgart
- District: Heilbronn
- Subdivisions: 6

Government
  - Mayor (2021–29): Björn Steinbach

Area
  - Total: 31.07 km^{2} (12.00 sq mi)
- Elevation: 203 m (666 ft)

Population (2025-12-31)
  - Total: 13,741
  - Density: 442.3/km^{2} (1,145/sq mi)
- Time zone: UTC+01:00 (CET)
  - Summer (DST): UTC+02:00 (CEST)
- Postal codes: 74182
- Dialling codes: 07130 und 07134
- Vehicle registration: HN
- Website: www.obersulm.de

Obersulm (German pronunciation: [ˈoːbɐˌzʊlm]) is a municipality in the district of Heilbronn, Baden-Württemberg, Germany, formed in the 1970s as a merger of the formerly independent municipalities Affaltrach, Eichelberg, Eschenau, Sülzbach, Weiler, and Willsbach. It is situated 12 km east of Heilbronn. Its name refers to its geographical location in the upper ("Ober-") valley of the small river Sulm.

The nineteenth-century synagogue has been restored in 1987.

== Demographics ==
Population development:

Year	Inhabitants
1990	11,712
2001	13,512
2011	13,358
2021	13,903

== See also ==
- Jews in Affaltrach
