= History of the Jews in Affaltrach =

The history of the Jews in Affaltrach in Obersulm, Germany started in the 17th century and ended in the 20th century during the Holocaust.

Affaltrach is a village in southwest Germany, in the Obersulm municipality, about 50 km northeast of Stuttgart. The village Jewish synagogue and cemetery are the last remnants of the former Affaltrach Jewish community.

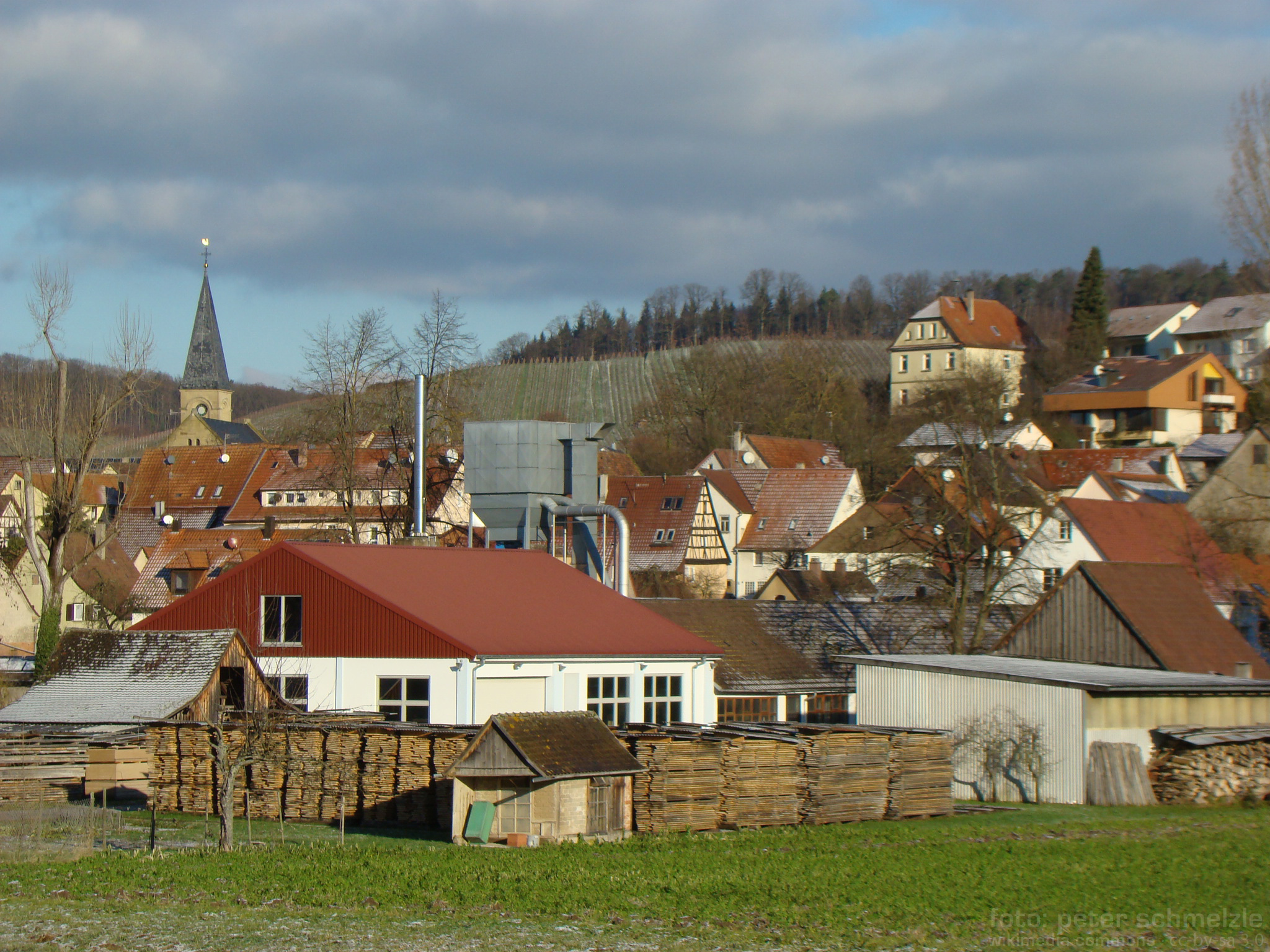
Affaltrach in December 2010

== History ==
=== Before the 19th century ===
Jews began to settle in Affaltrach in 1660, under the protection of the ruling Knights Hospitaller order. In 1683, three or four Jewish families were living in Affaltrach. By 1749, the Jewish community of Affaltrach reached to about 17 families, dealing mainly with trading cattle, money and goods. A Jewish cemetery was established in 1706.

=== 19th century ===
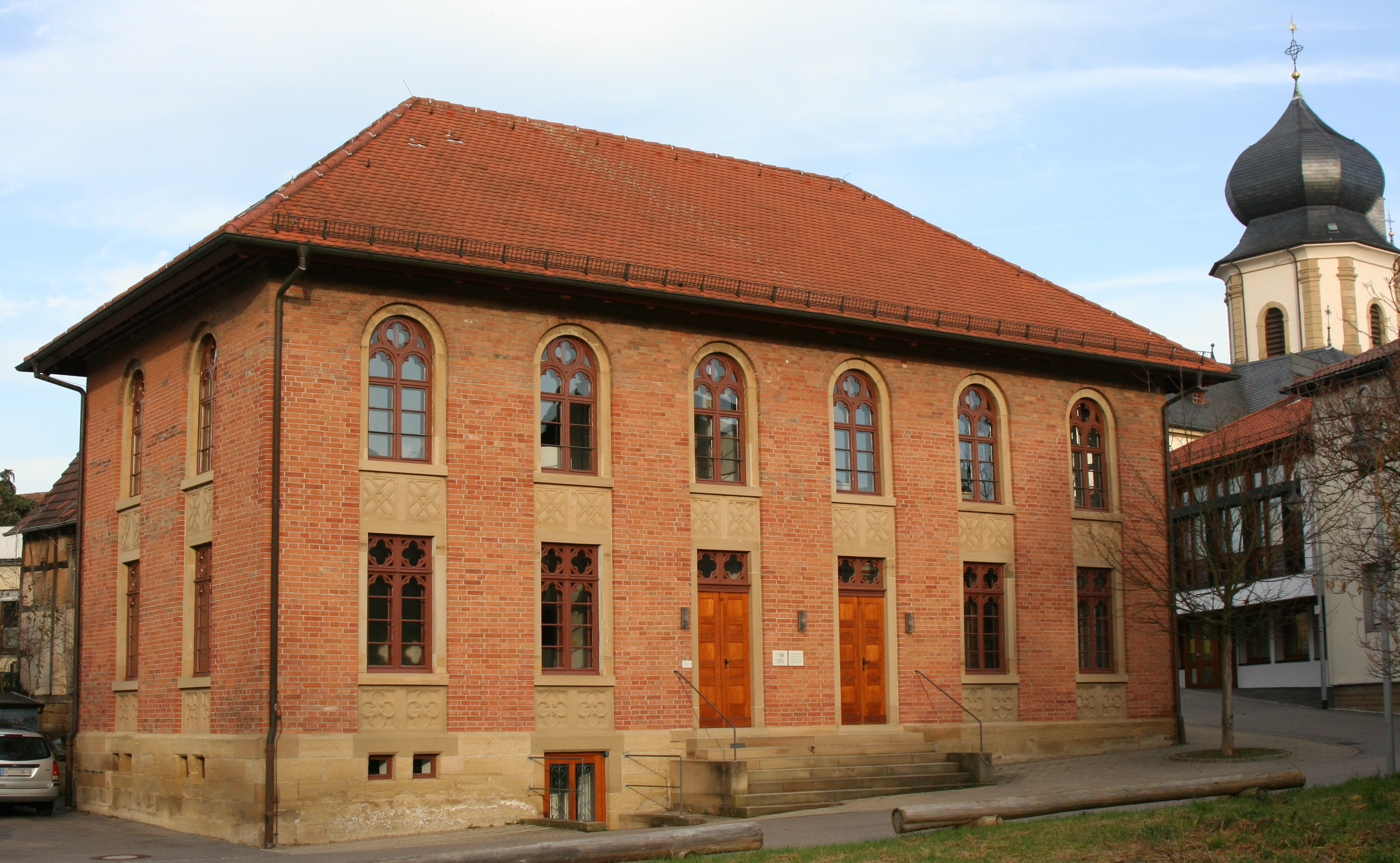
Affaltrach synagogue in 2006

In the 19th century the Jewish community of Affaltrach was larger than at any other time: in 1807 there were 110 Jews (about 11% of the total population); in 1843, 164 Jews; and in 1858, 219 Jews. In the second half of the 19th century the community started shrank to 151 in 1869, 79 in 1886 and 28 in 1910 (3.75% of the total population).

A report stated that Affaltrach had 990 inhabitants in 1861, among them 219 Jews, and that in 1856 41 children studied in the Jewish school. Ttrade was mostly mediated by Jews.

=== 20th century ===
After the beginning of industrialization and with 19th century legislation on Jewish rights, Jews from rural areas settled in the bigger cities. There were about 21 Jewish people left in Affaltrach in 1921. During World War I, three Jews from Affaltrach who were drafted to the German military died in service, and were buried at the local Jewish cemetery. The names of the Jewish soldiers were erased from the town's war memorial during the Nazi Period. A memorial in their honor was also erected in the Jewish cemetery, which survived. During World War II, Jewish residents were denied access to their shops, and then were deported from the town between 1941 and 1943.

== Sights ==
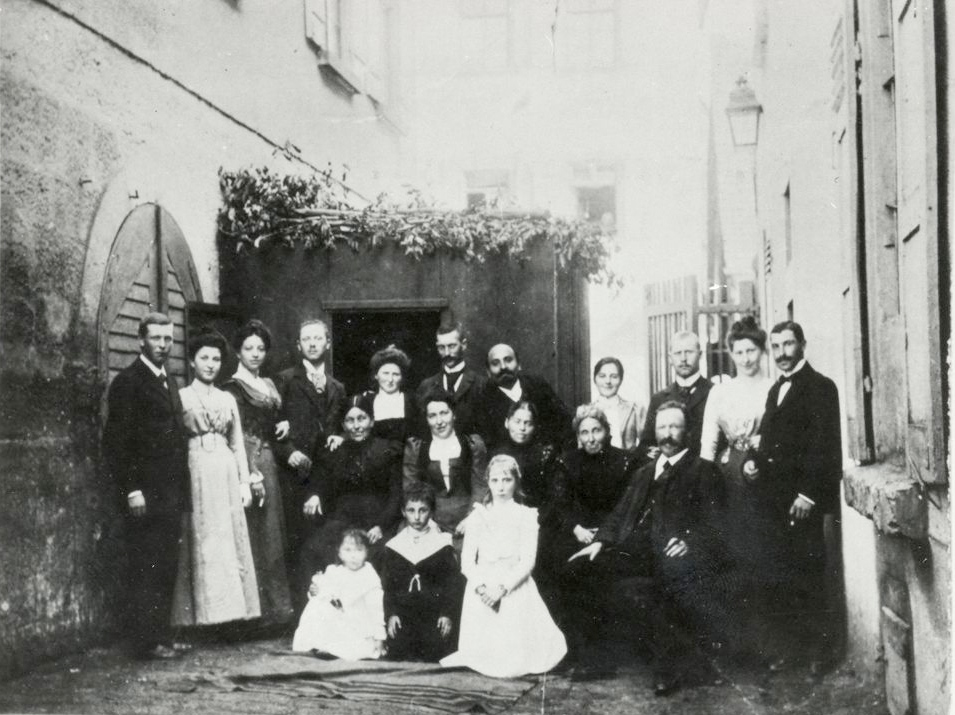
Jews in Affaltrach about 1900

=== Synagogue ===
The Jewish community of Affaltrach established a synagogue in 1701.

During the second half of the 18th century the synagogue was shared with the Jewish community of nearby Eschenau. Between 1820 and 1824 the synagogue was expanded and a women's gallery was added to it, at the cost of about 700 florins. In 1851 a newer synagogue replaced the old one. In addition to the synagogue itself, the building also had a teaching room, a teacher's apartment and a mikveh (ritual bath).

During the 1938 Kristallnacht attacks on German Jews the synagogue was devastated and used as a storeroom and refugee shelter. The synagogue is used as a museum for the Jewish community of Affaltrach and maintained by an association specifically dealing with the building. The museum collection shows a few ritual objects, posters and pictures depicting the history of Jews in the Heilbronn area.

=== Jewish cemetery ===
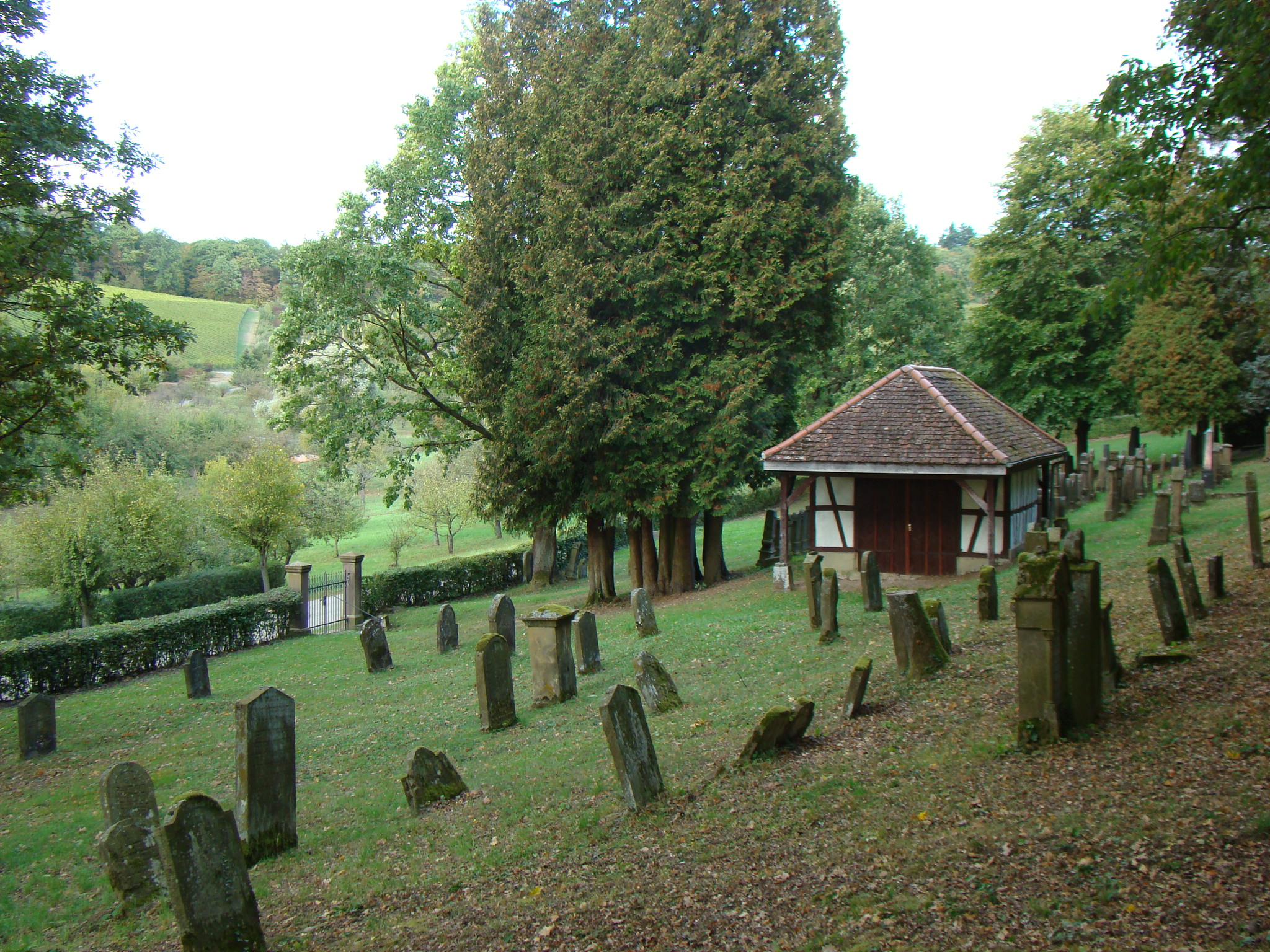
Jewish cemetery Affaltrach

The Affaltrach Jewish cemetery is north of the village itself. The oldest existing gravestone is from 1677. The cemetery served Affaltrach and the nearby villages of Sontheim, Talheim and Horkheim. The cemetery hall and the memorial for the fallen Jewish soldiers who served in the German army during World War I are in the cemetery grounds. The cemetery is estimated to have around 700 graves, the last one dated to August 1942.

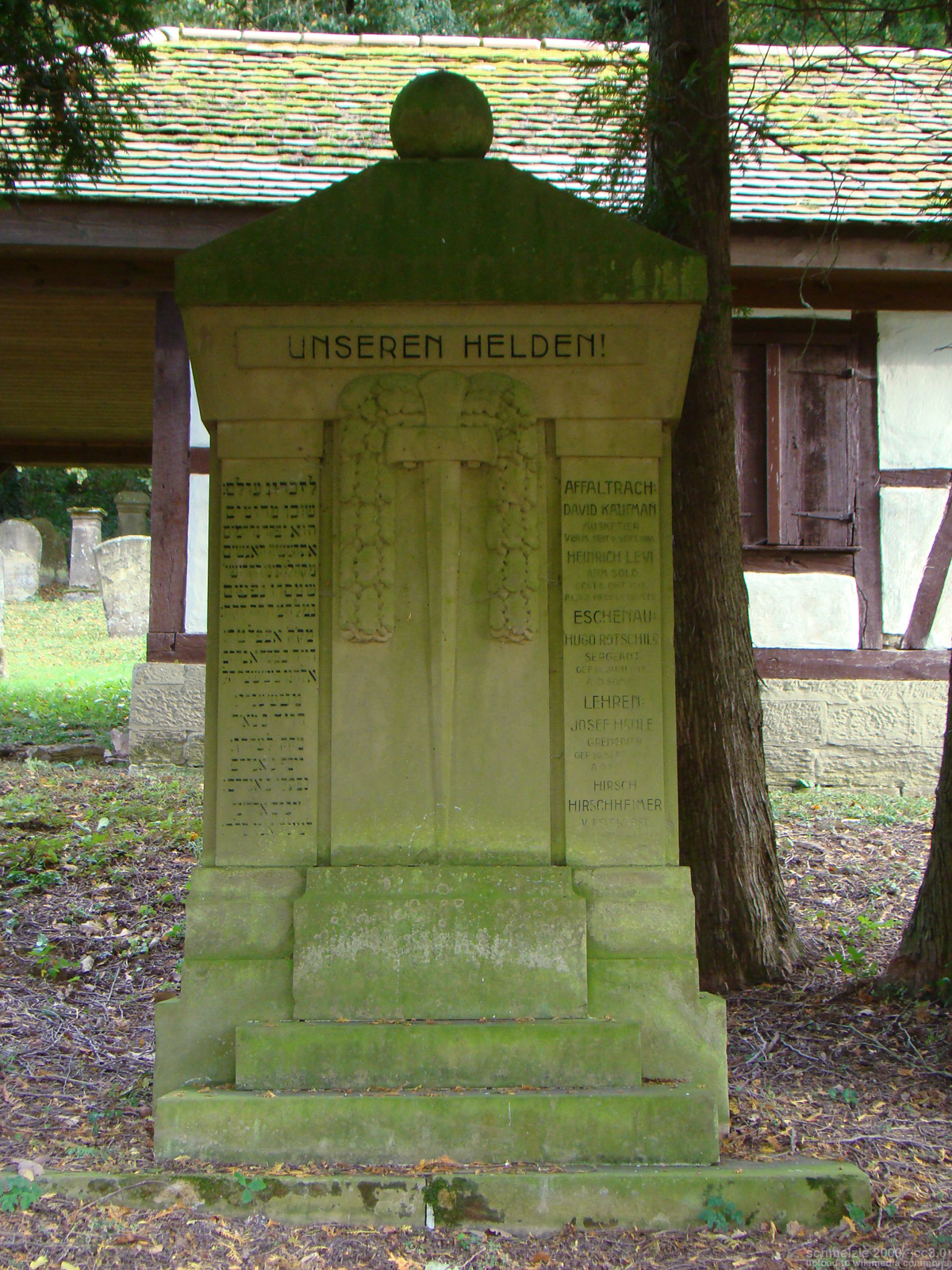
World War I memorial at Jewish cemetery Affaltrach

The key to the synagogue is kept at the Protestant Rectory in Affaltrach.

== Notable residents ==
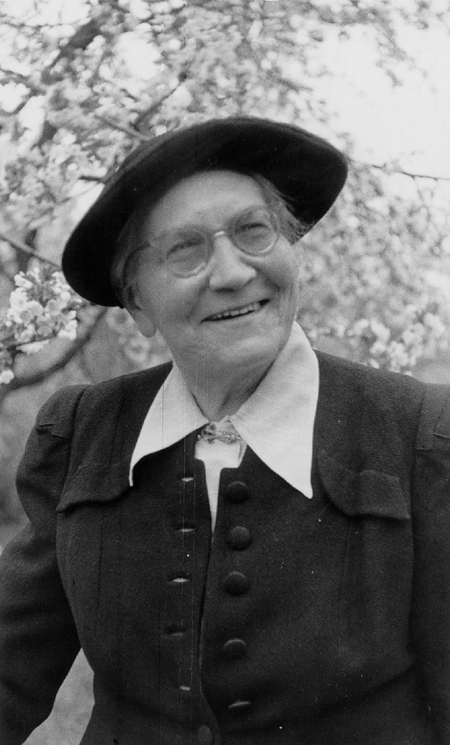
Bertha Thalheimer

Two notable Jewish residents of Affaltrach were August and Bertha Thalheimer, a brother and sister from Affaltrach who were Communist activists in the first half of the 20th century and among the founders of the Spartacus League.

== Reports ==
=== Antisemitic incident in 1899 ===
In February 1899, an article describing an antisemitic incident in Affaltrach was published in Allgemeine Zeitung des Judentums. Apparently, a few young men attacked a few Jewish shop owners in Affaltrach, causing them slight injuries and insulting Judaism. They were given trials and were sentenced to about 14 days of prison and a fine; some irregularities were found in the process of the trial, according to the article.
