= Portuguese in Germany =

German Portuguese
Luso-alemães (Portuguese) Portugiesen in Deutschland (German)

Total population
- 244,217

Languages
- German, Portuguese

Religion
- Predominantly Christianity (Roman Catholicism), Irreligion

Related ethnic groups
- Other Portuguese people, Portuguese in Austria, Portuguese in Liechtenstein, Portuguese in the Netherlands, Portuguese in Switzerland

Portuguese in Germany (German: Portugiesen in Deutschland) are citizens and residents of Germany who are of Portuguese descent.

Portuguese in Germany (also known as Portuguese Germans / German Portuguese Community or, in Portuguese, known as Portugueses na Alemanha / Comunidade portuguesa na Alemanha / Luso-alemães) are the citizens or residents of Germany whose ethnic origins lie in Portugal.

Portuguese Germans are Portuguese-born citizens with German citizenship or German-born citizens of Portuguese ancestry or citizenship.

There are about 245,000 Portuguese people living in Germany as of 2021. They represent 0.29% of the country's population.

== History ==
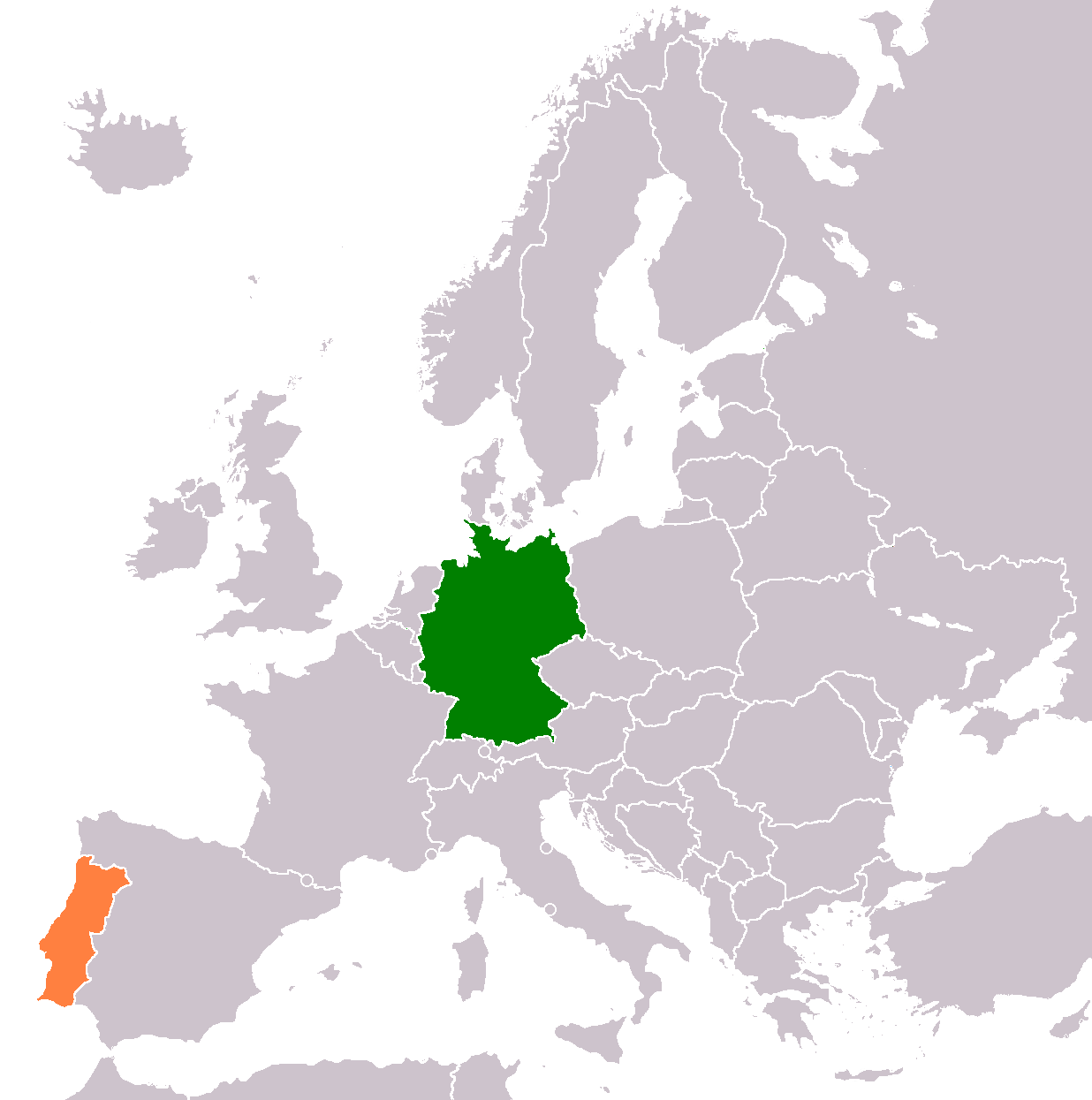
Map showing the location of the two countries within Europe

Regional distribution of Portuguese citizens in Germany in 2021

Portuguese in Germany have been known since the 16th century. They are now part of the Portuguese diaspora scattered around the world and are generally considered low profile and well integrated.

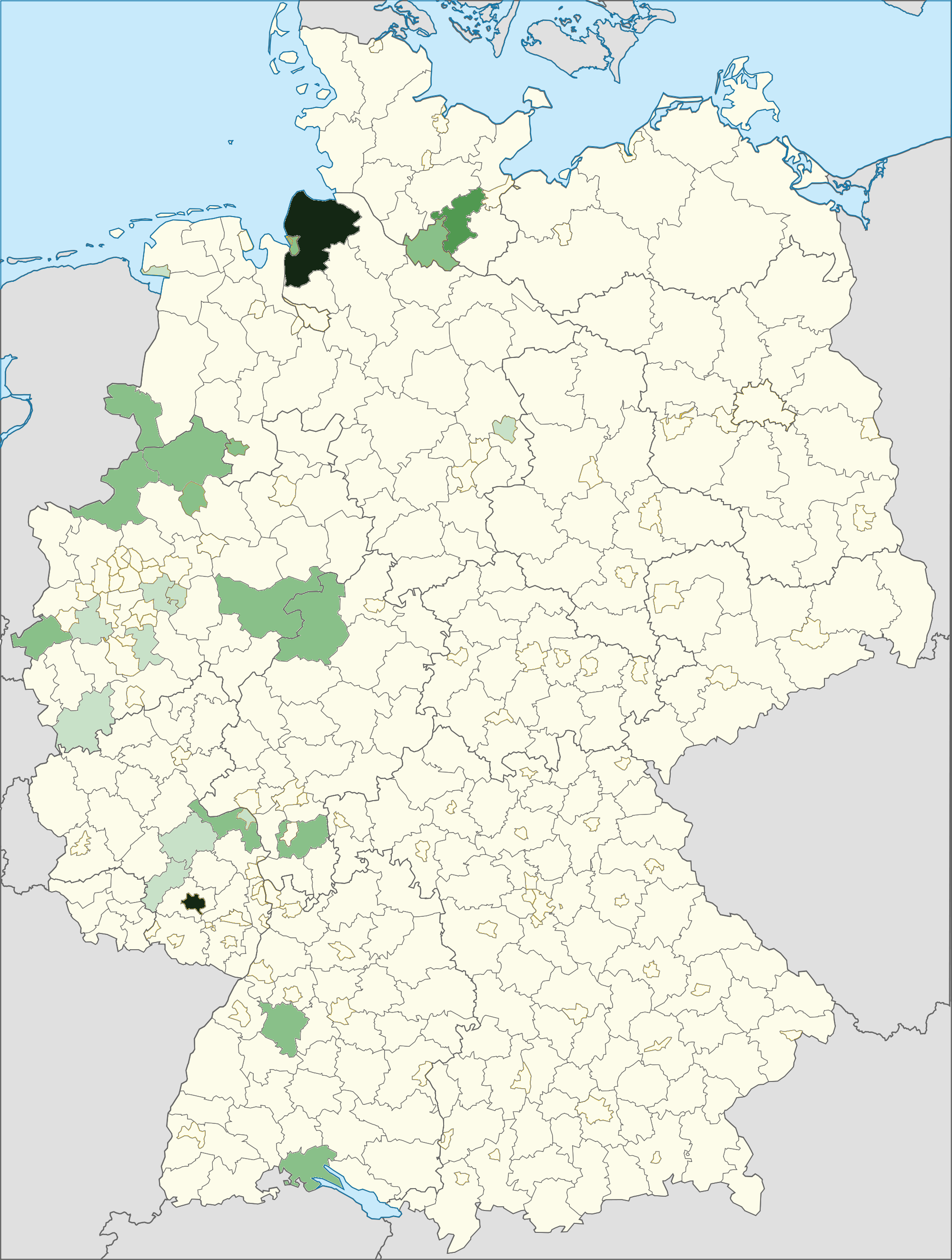
Relative frequency of Portuguese nationals at county level 2014 (relative to other foreign populations)

The initial larger Portuguese community in Germany emerged during the 16th century in the Hanseatic city of Hamburg, when Sephardic Jews sought refuge here from the Inquisition.

During the First World War, approximately 5,000 Portuguese prisoners of war were temporarily held in Germany, primarily at the specially constructed prisoner of war camp in Breesen, and occasionally in other camps like Soltau-Ahften.

In the final three years of World War II, some Portuguese individuals were deported to German concentration camps, mainly from occupied France. Recent estimates suggest that around 1,000 Portuguese, mainly members of the Luso-French community, were used by Nazi Germany. Sadly, a few dozen of them lost their lives there. In 1941, about 150 Portuguese volunteers joined the Spanish Blue Division to support Nazi Germany. They were primarily ex-Legion Viriatos members and fought on the Eastern Front.

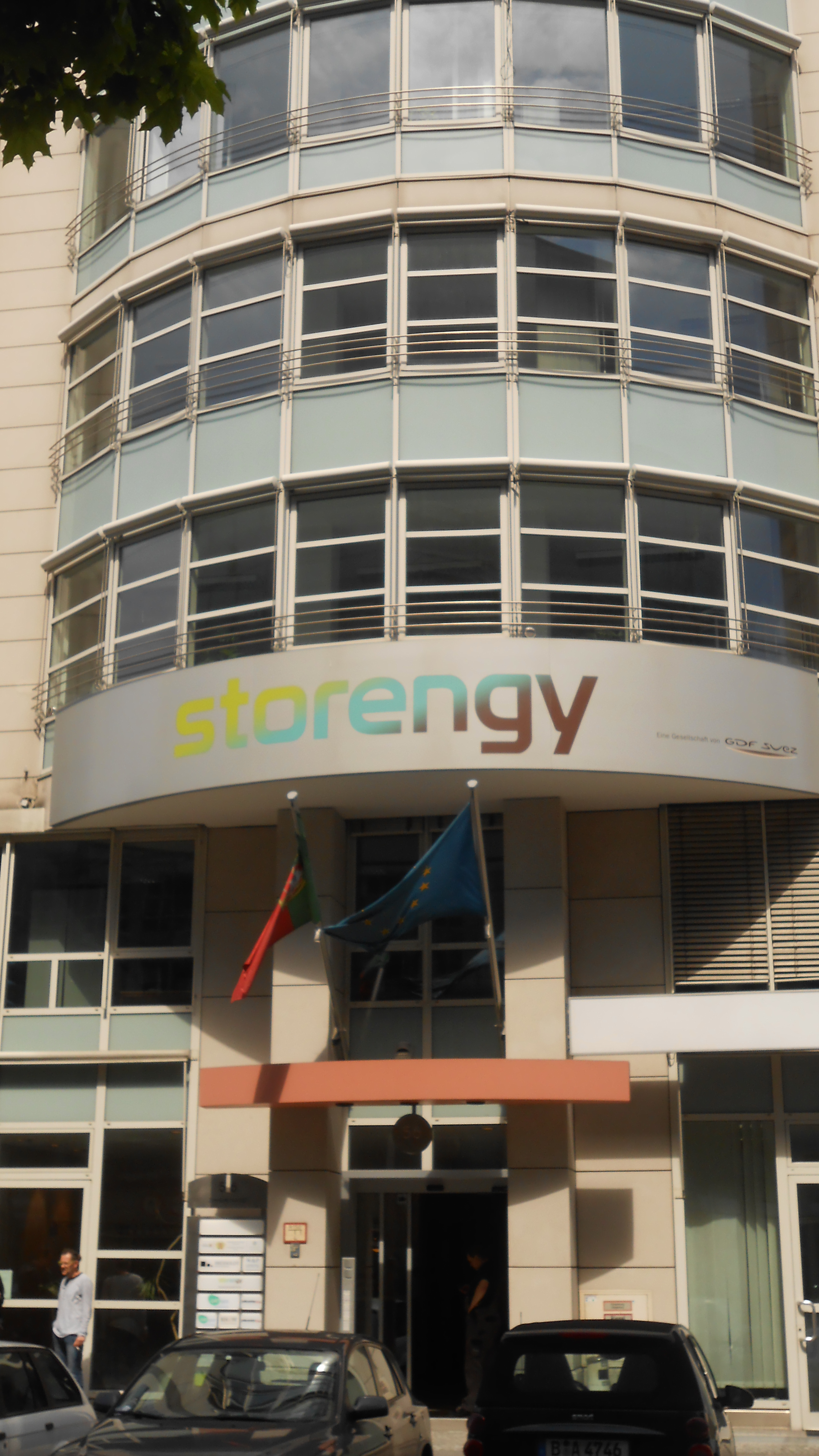
Portuguese embassy, Portugal's tourism agency (Turismo de Portugal) and the Portuguese Chamber of Commerce (AICEP)

n the post-war period, Hundreds of thousands of Portuguese settled as guest workers in other European countries, especially in Western Europe.

Following a recruitment agreement between the Federal Republic of Germany and Portugal, tens of thousands of Portuguese guest workers arrived since 17 March 1964.

The Portuguese Armando Rodrigues de Sá was officially welcomed in 1964 as the millionth "guest worker" in Germany and was given a certificate of honor and a two-seater Zündapp Sport Combinette – Mokick.

After the Carnation Revolution in 1974 and Portugal's EU accession in 1986, the country experienced significant economic growth and a decline in emigration.

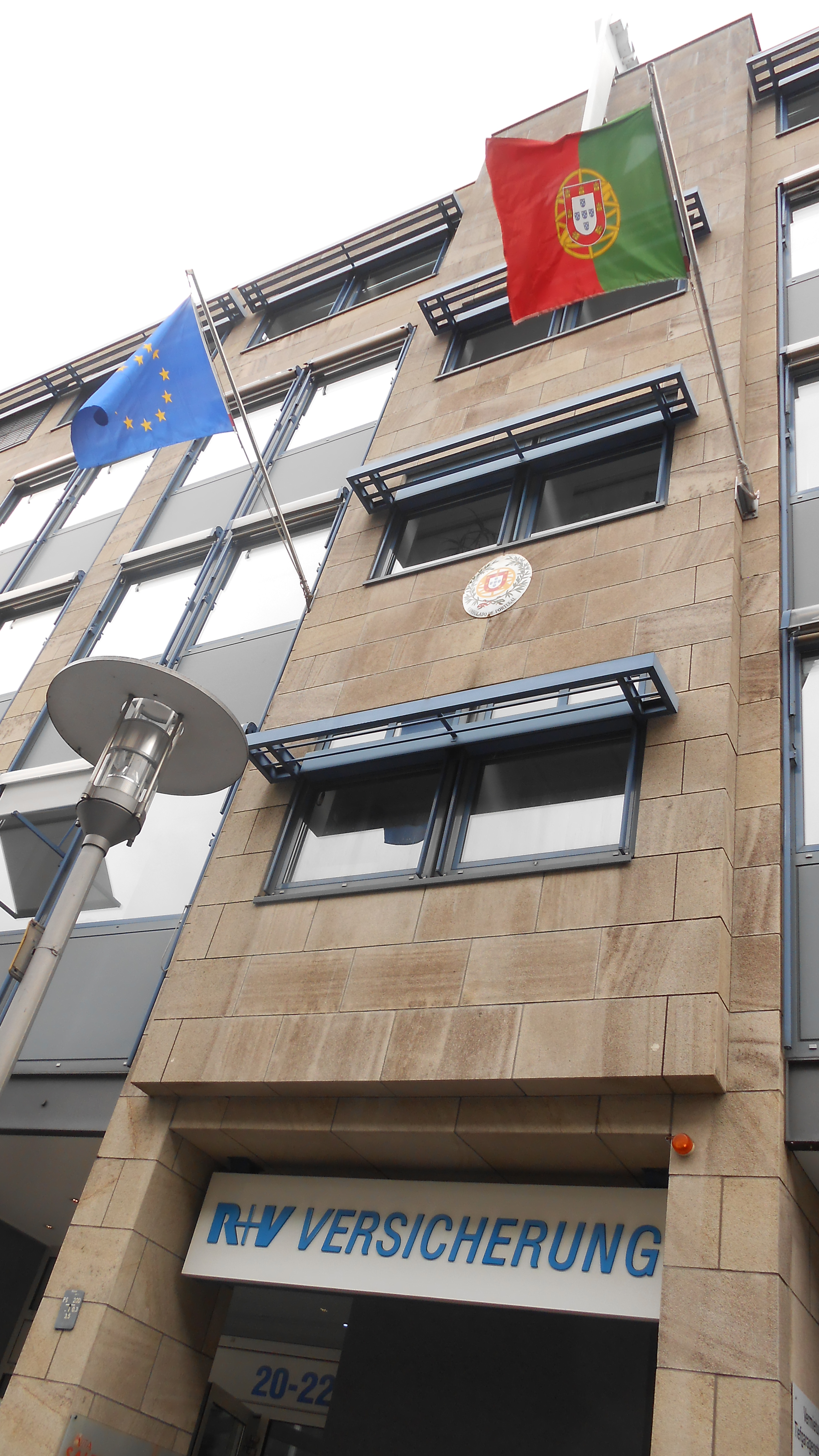
Portuguese consulate in Düsseldorf

In Germany, the demand for foreign labor was extremely high during the "Golden Years" (Wirtschaftswunder) of the 1960s. Following the 1973 oil crisis, the German government curtailed immigration and, until 1983, implemented a policy to promote and encourage return migration.

Due to growing xenophobia and an increase in unemployment among foreign workers, the German government passed a law in October 1983 to finance the voluntary return of foreign workers to their countries of origin. Foreign workers who were legally recruited and residing in the country individually received a reimbursement of 10,500 Deutsche Marks – approximately the amount they had contributed to the German social security system (retirement fund).

This program was only applicable to foreigners leaving Germany before 30 June 1984. According to Zimmermann et al. (1998: 1–7), 20 thousand Portuguese workers participated in the program. As a result, the Portuguese population in Germany decreased to 69 thousand by 1987.

However, during the 2008 financial crisis and 2010–2014 Portuguese financial crisis, emigration from Portugal to Germany increased once again.

Nowadays, the immigrants are mostly well-educated, often holding academic qualifications. In recent years, Berlin has become particularly attractive to Portuguese academics, specialists, and students, even surpassing Hamburg as the city with the largest Portuguese community.

== Demographics ==
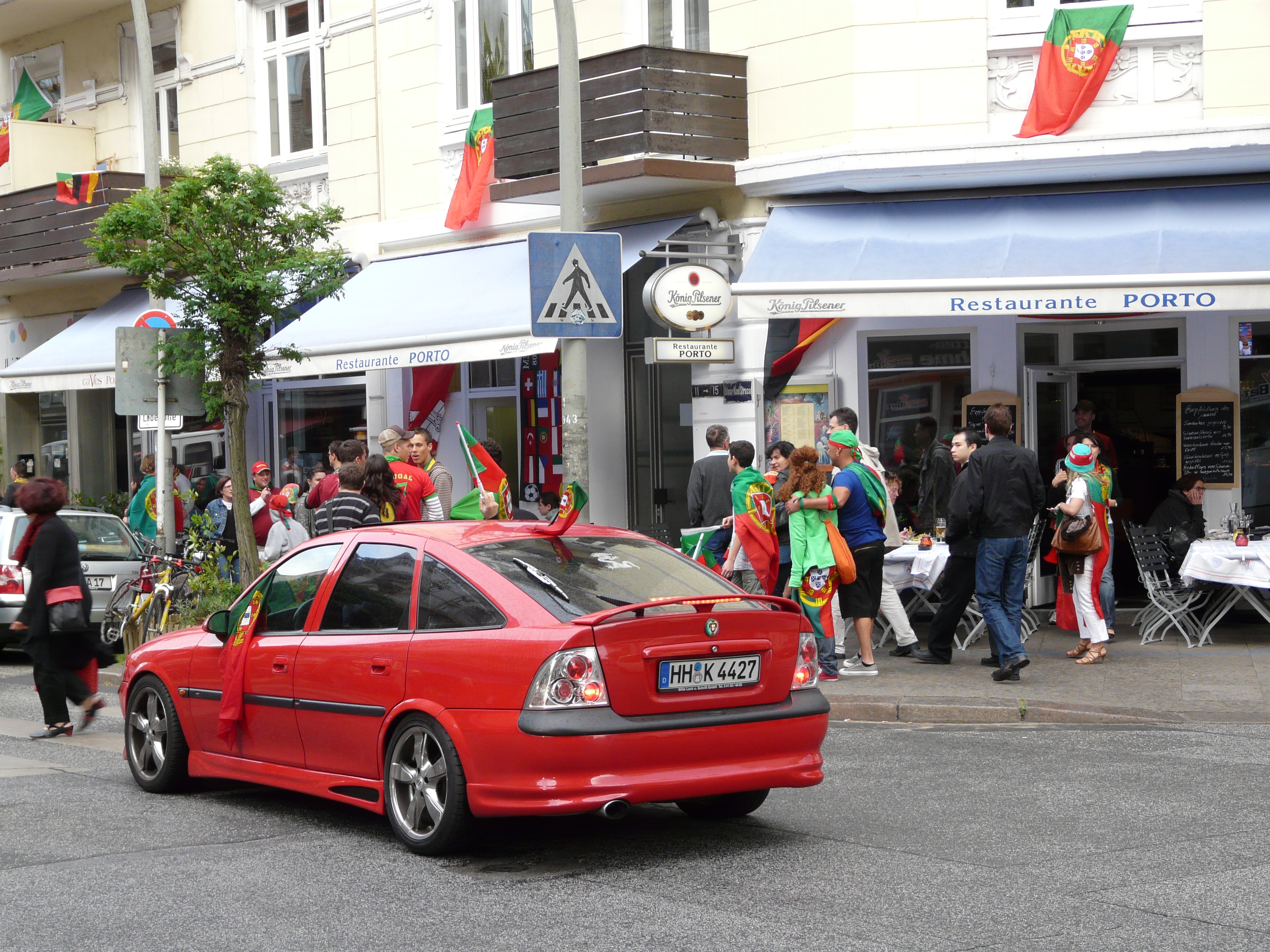
Hamburg's Little Portugal

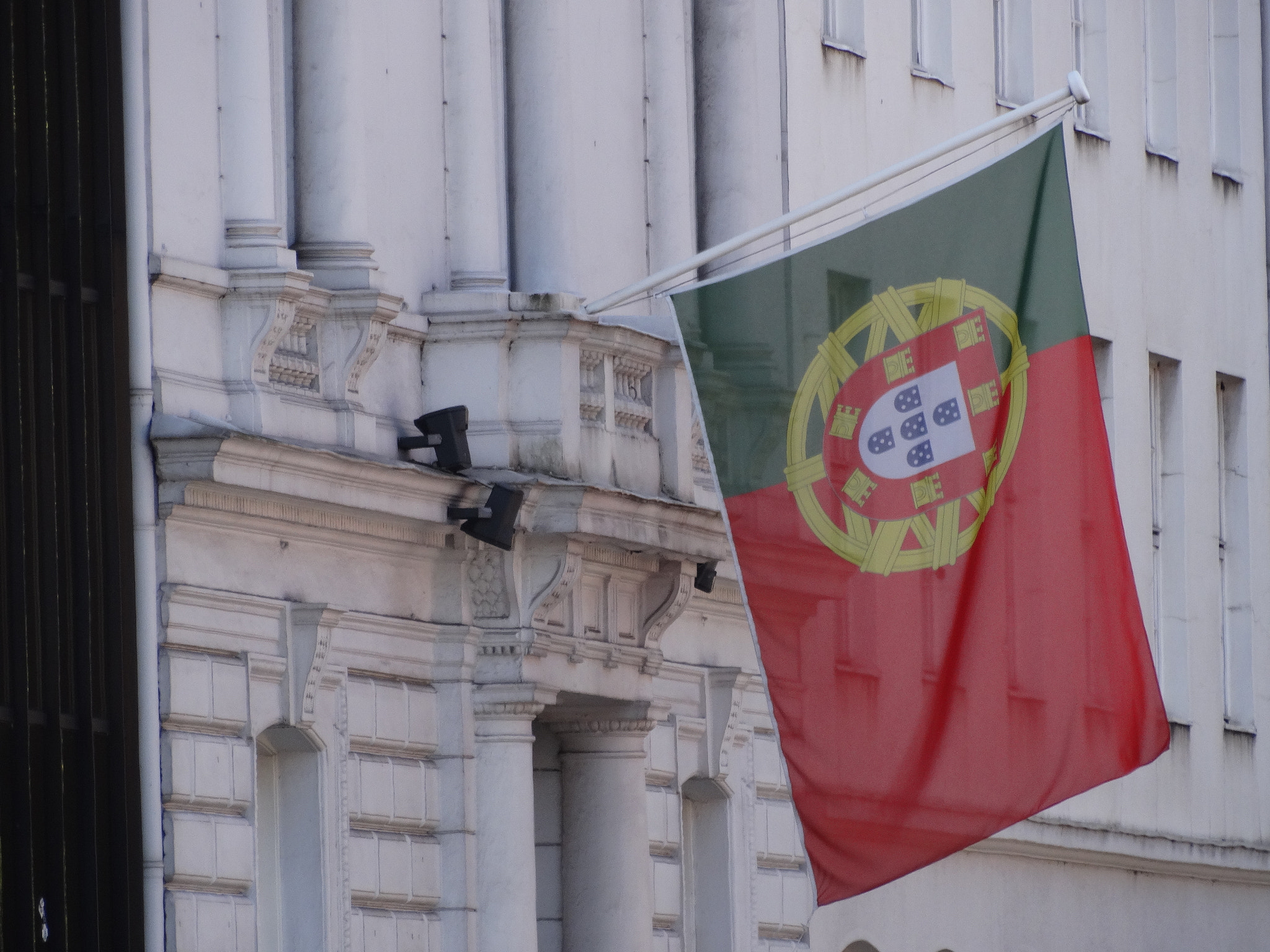
Portuguese flag in Hamburg

The largest Portuguese community is located in Hamburg, where about 25,000 people with Portuguese heritage live. There is also a Portugiesenviertel (Portuguese quarter) in Hamburg near the Port of Hamburg and between the subway stations of Landungsbrücken and Baumwall where many Portuguese restaurants and cafes are located there. In Germany there are 145 Portuguese associations. The Portuguese associations are found all over Germany and are often related to sports centers, language centers or community centers. Despite the widespread presence of Portuguese centers, there is a higher concentration in Nordrhein-Westphalen (North Rhine-Westphalia), Baden-Württemberg and Hessen: despite hosting around 42% of Germany's population, these states (Länder) host around 60% of the Portuguese community.

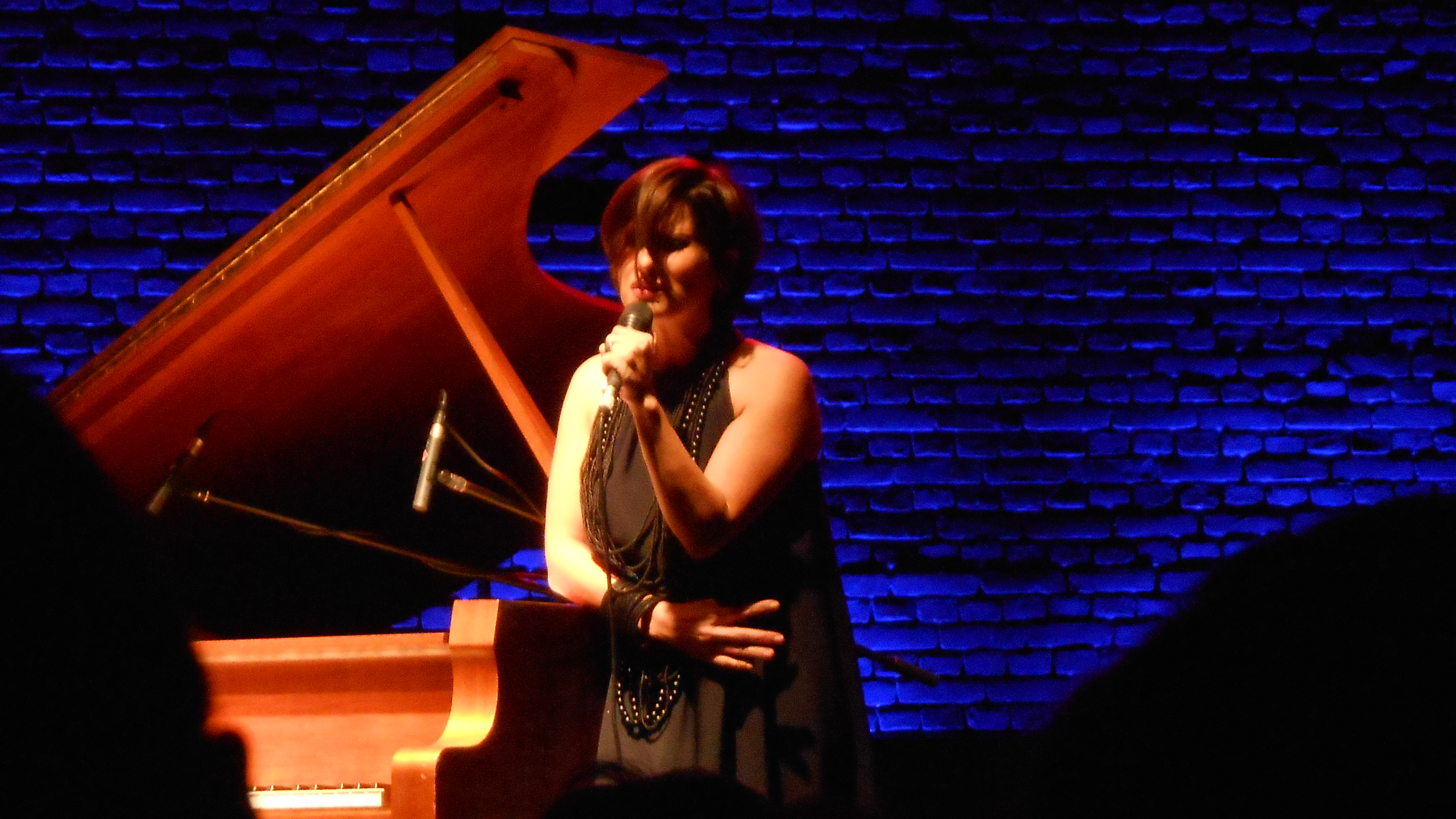
Cristina Branco singing in Germany

The Portuguese community, despite being highly integrated, retains distinctive features of Portuguese religious culture such as Catholic Christmas and devotion to Our Lady of Fátima.

Portuguese in Germany tend to have settled long time ago, and they have generally spent more than 20 years in the country.

Number of Portuguese in larger cities
| # | City | People |
| 1. | Hamburg | 12,465 |
| 2. | Berlin | 6,373 |
| 3. | Stuttgart | 4,172 |
| 4. | Frankfurt | 3,991 |
| 5. | Munich | 3,472 |
| 6. | Cologne | 3,263 |
| 7. | Bremen | 2,430 |
| 8. | Dortmund | 1,980 |
| 9. | Mainz | 1,923 |
| 10. | Düsseldorf | 1,805 |

== Remittances ==
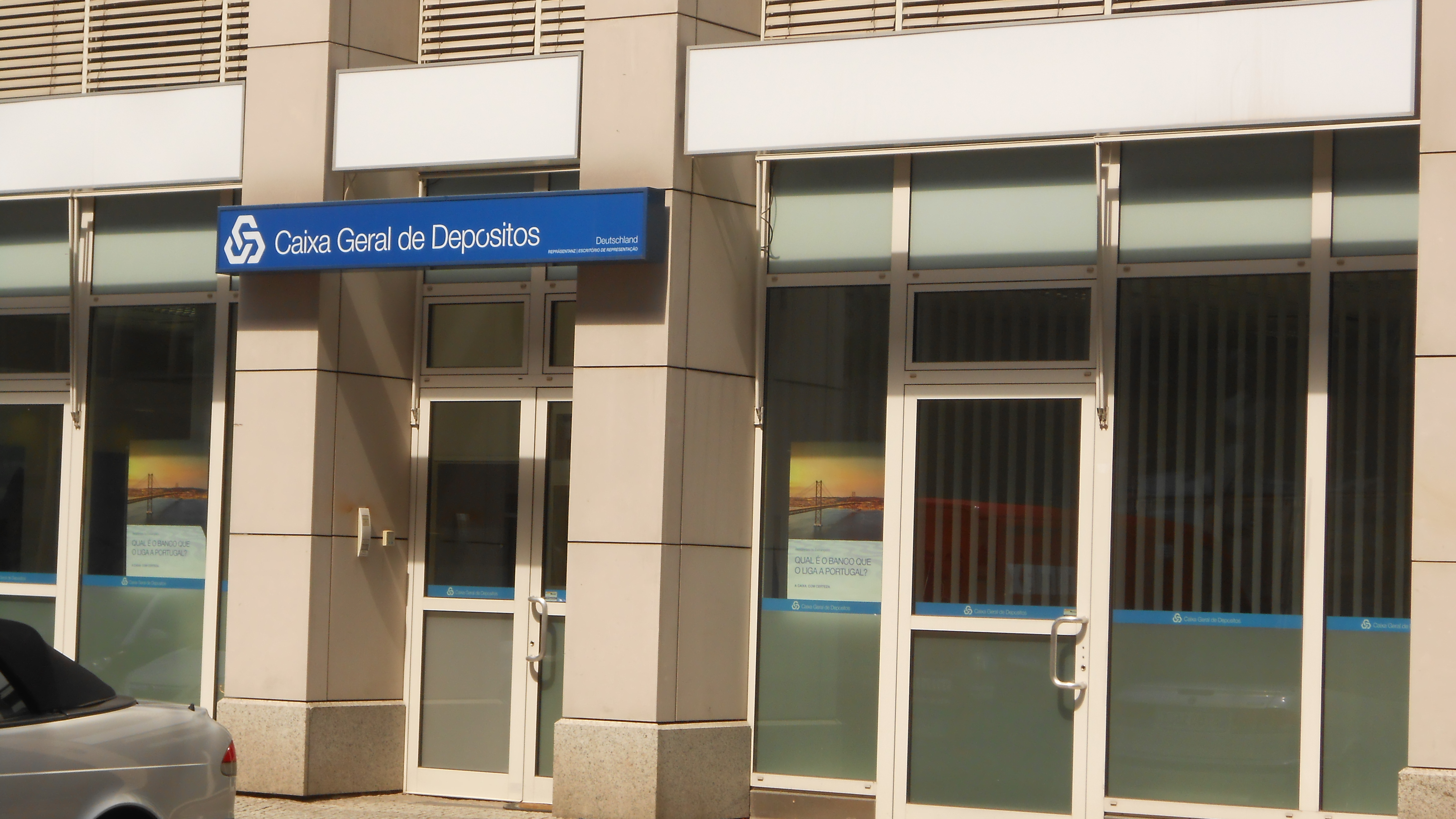
Caixa Geral de Depósitos in Berlin

The two countries enjoy friendly relationships and mutual trust, witnessing increasing trade as well.

The Portuguese community in Germany retains strong ties with its homeland and, between 2000 and 2021, it has sent approximately 4.5 billion euros (€) to Portugal in remittances. In the same timeframe, Germans in Portugal (numbering around 20,500 individuals) have sent approximately 136.4 million euros (€) to Germany.

== Portuguese language ==
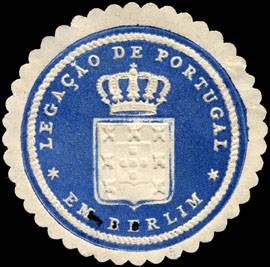
Legal seal of the Portuguese legation in Germany (19th century)

In several German cities, one can find associations dedicated to Portuguese culture, parishes where Portuguese is spoken, and classes specifically tailored for native Portuguese speakers, which are also available in mainstream schools. For instance, at the Max Planck High School in Dortmund, Portuguese is offered up to the Abitur level.

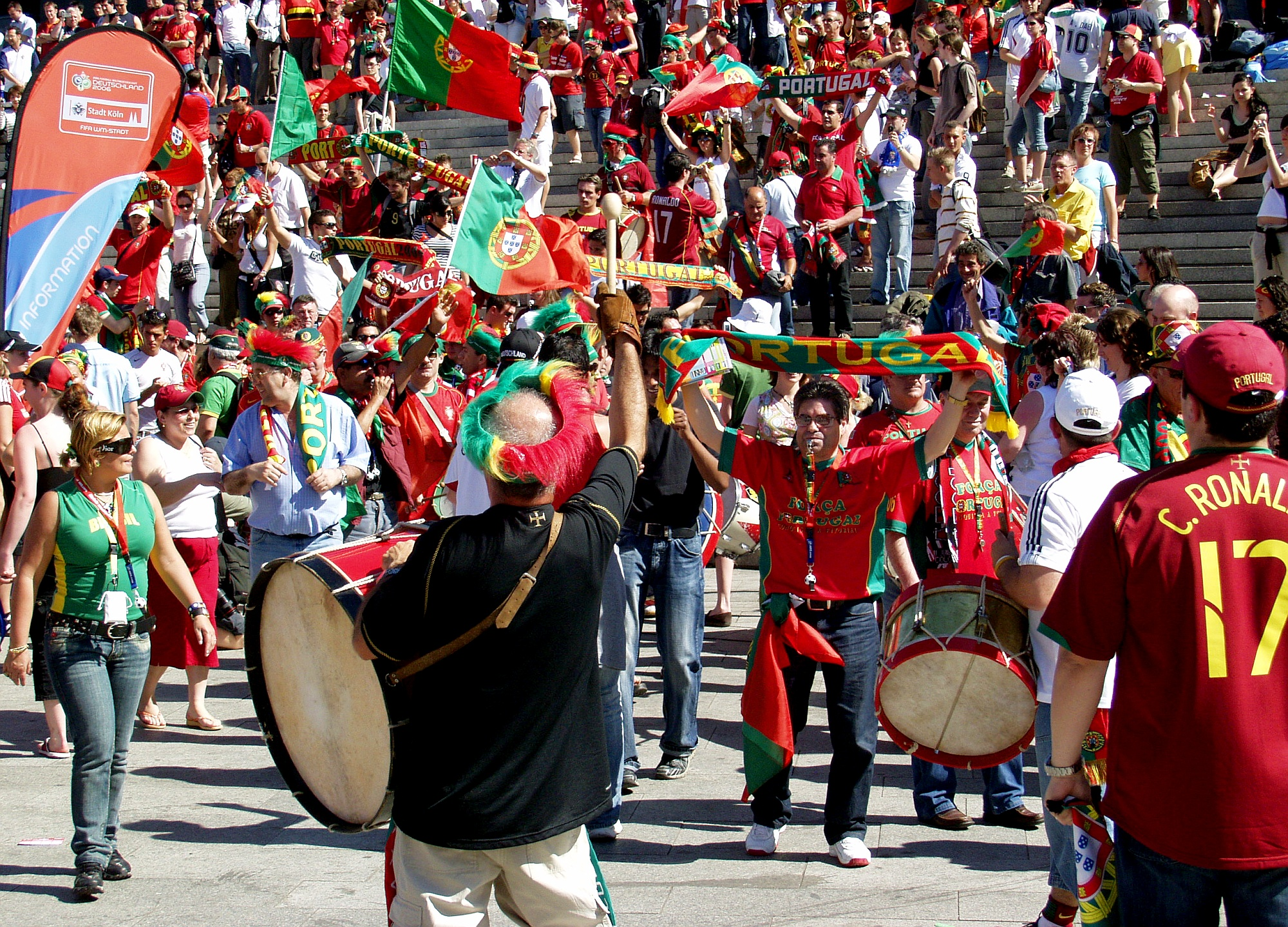
Fans of the Portuguese national football team in Cologne

The Portuguese cultural associations are predominantly organized under the Federal Association FAPA (Federal Association of Portuguese Associations in Germany). Additionally, the Portuguese cultural institute, Instituto Camões, operates a language center in Hamburg and a cultural center in Berlin, along with various partnerships and lectureships.

Portugal Post, a Portuguese-language newspaper, has been published throughout Germany since 1993, with its headquarters located in Dortmund. Since 2018, its base of operations has shifted to Berlin.

Nowadays, Portuguese is not only a heritage language for migrants coming from countries such as Portugal or Brazil, but it is also studied by German people with interest towards Lusophone culture.

== Notable people ==
- Eleanor of Portugal (1434–1467): Holy Roman Empress from 1452 to 1467
- Maximilian I (1459–1519): Holy Roman Emperor from 1508 to 1519
- Isabella of Portugal (1503–1539): Holy Roman Empress from 1530 to 1539
- Malvina Garrigues (1825–1904): Danish-born Luso-German opera singer
- Alfredo Keil (1850–1907): Portuguese composer and painter
- Júlia da Silva Bruhns (1851–1923): German-Brazilian writer
- José Vianna da Motta (1868–1948): Portuguese pianist. He lived and worked in Germany for 30 years
- Heinrich Mann (1871–1950): German writer known for his socio-political novels
- Thomas Mann (1875–1955): German novelist and Nobel prize laureate
- Isaak Benrubi (1876–1943): German philosopher
- Julia Löhr (1877–1927): She was the archetype of the fictional character Ines Institoris in Thomas Mann's novel Doctor Faustus
- Carla Mann (1881–1910): German actress. Thomas Mann's sister
- Aquilino Ribeiro (1885–1963): Portuguese writer and diplomat. He is generally considered to be one of the great Portuguese novelists of the 20th century and in 1960, he was nominated for the Nobel lPrize in Literature. He traveled to Germany several times in the 1920s and wrote a book about it (including Berlin, Hildesheim, Hamburg)
- Viktor Mann (1890–1949): German writer. Thomas Mann's brother
- Arthur Duarte (1895–1982): Portuguese actor and director
- David Shaltiel (1903–1969): Israeli military officer
- Erika Mann (1905–1969): German actress and writer. Thomas Mann's eldest daughter
- Klaus Mann (1906–1949): German writer and dissident. Thomas Mann's eldest son
- Golo Mann (1909–1994): German historian. Thomas Mann's second son
- Monika Mann (1910–1992): German author. Thomas Mann's second daughter
- Leonie Mann (1916–1986): Translator, Heinrich Mann's daughter
- Elisabeth Mann Borgese (1918–2002): Canadian German-born expert in maritime law, ecologist. Thomas Mann's youngest daughter
- Michael Mann (1919–1977): German academic. Thomas Mann's youngest son
- Maria de Lourdes Belchior Pontes (1923–1998): Portuguese writer, poet, professor and diplomat
- Frido Mann (1940): German-Swiss psychologist and author. Thomas Mann's grandson
- José Luis Encarnação (1941): Portuguese computer scientist, founder of the Fraunhofer Institute for computer graphics
- Herman José (1954): German-Portuguese television personality
- Lourdes Picareta (1958): Portuguese filmmaker
- Fernando Abrantes (1960): German-Portuguese producer and musician
- Miguel Alexandre (1968): German-Portuguese filmmaker
- Marinho (1970): Portuguese footballer
- Eugénia da Conceição-Heldt (1970): Portuguese political scientist
- Grada Kilomba: Portuguese artist and academic psychologist
- Leonor Antunes (1972): Portuguese contemporary artist
- Telmo Pires (1972): fado singer
- Alexander Nuno Alvaro (1975): German politician
- Roberto Pinto (1978): German-Portuguese former footballer
- Manuel Cortez (1979): German-Portuguese actor, creative director and photographer.
- Kosta Rodrigues (1979): German former footballer
- Sérgio Pinto (1980): Portuguese former footballer
- Rubina Berardo (1982): Portuguese politician
- Hugo Almeida (1984): Portuguese former footballer
- Manuel Schmiedebach (1988): German footballer
- Telmo Teixeira-Rebelo (1988): German-Portuguese footballer
- Marcel Correia (1989): Portuguese footballer
- Ricky Pinheiro (1989): Portuguese footballer
- Cristiano (1990): Portuguese footballer
- Nils Teixeira (1990): Nils Teixeira
- Cédric Soares (1991): Portuguese footballer
- Ana Leite (1991): Portuguese footballer
- Kevin Rodrigues-Pires (1991): Portuguese footballer
- Daniel Heuer Fernandes (1992): Portuguese footballer
- Tatjana Pinto (1992): German sprinter
- Rafael de Sousa Albuquerque (1992): German-Portuguese footballer
- Sebastian Ferreira (1994): German-South African rugby player
- Catarina dos Santos Firnhaber (1994): German politician
- Marcelo Salinas (1995): Chilean-Portuguese footballer

== Literature ==
- João Barrento, Klaus Pörtl (Hrsg.): Verflechtungen. Deutschland und Portugal. TFM-Verlag, Frankfurt am Main 2002, ISBN 3-925203-89-3
- Michael Studemund-Halévy: Portugal in Hamburg. Ellert & Richter Verlag, Hamburg 2007, ISBN 978-3-8319-0267-5
- Luísa Coelho (Hrsg.): Encontros Por Contar Alemanha e Portugal. Orfeu, Brüssel 2014, ISBN 978-2-87530-044-7
- Fernando Ribeiro (Hrsg.): Alemanha: Portugal. Edições Humus, Ribeirão 2014, ISBN 978-989-755-025-6
- Entre o Cais e o Sonho – 50 Jahre Portugiesen in Deutschland – 50 Jahre Millionster Gastarbeiter, documentation of the symposium "Looking back to shape the future" (Cologne, 13 September 2014), Portugal-Post-Verlag 2014

== See also ==
- Gastarbeiter
- Germany-Portugal relations
- Portuguese in Austria
- Portuguese in Belgium
- Portuguese in France
- Portuguese in Liechtenstein
- Portuguese in the Netherlands
- Portuguese in Switzerland
- Portuguese people
