= List of football stadiums in Austria =

The following is a list of football stadiums in Austria, ranked in order of capacity, with the minimum capacity being 5,000.

== Current stadiums ==
#	Image	Stadium	Capacity	City	Home team	UEFA rank
1		Ernst Happel Stadion	50,865	Vienna	Austria national team	4/4 stars
2		28 Black Arena	32,000	Klagenfurt	SK Austria Klagenfurt	4/4 stars
3		Red Bull Arena	30,188	Salzburg	Red Bull Salzburg	4/4 stars
4		Allianz Stadion	30,345	Vienna	SK Rapid Wien	4/4 stars
5		Raiffeisen Arena	19,080	Linz	LASK	
6		Generali Arena	17,656	Vienna	FK Austria Wien	
7		Tivoli Neu	17,400	Innsbruck	FC Wacker Tirol	
8		Pappelstadion	15,700	Mattersburg	SV Mattersburg	
9		UPC-Arena	15,312	Graz	SK Sturm Graz	
10		Bundesstadion Südstadt	12,000	Maria Enzersdorf	VfB Admira Wacker Mödling	
11		ImmoAgentur Stadium	12,000	Bregenz	SW Bregenz	
12		Sepp-Doll-Stadion	10,000	Krems	Kremser SC	
13		Franz Fekete Stadium	9,640	Kapfenberg	Kapfenberger SV	
14		Vorwärts Stadium	9,500	Steyr	Vorwärts Steyr	
15		Reichshofstadion	8,800	Lustenau	SC Austria Lustenau, FC Lustenau 07	
16		Stadion Schnabelholz	8,500	Altach	SC Rheindorf Altach	
17		NV Arena	8,000	Sankt Pölten	SKN St. Pölten	
18		Sportklub Stadium	7,828	Vienna	Wiener Sport-Club	
19		Lavanttal-Arena	7,800	Wolfsberg	Wolfsberger AC	
20		Innviertel Arena	7,680	Ried im Innkreis	SV Ried	
21		Stadion Birkenwiese	7,500	Dornbirn	FC Dornbirn 1913	
22		Stadion Wiener Neustadt	7,500	Wiener Neustadt	FC Magna Wiener Neustadt	
23		Waldstadion	7,152	Pasching	FC Pasching	
24		Rudolf-Tonn-Stadion	7,000	Schwechat	SV Schwechat, FC Mauerwerk	

== See also ==
- Football in Austria
- List of football clubs in Austria
- List of European stadiums by capacity
- List of association football stadiums by capacity
- Lists of stadiums
