= Portuguese in Austria =

Austrian Portuguese
Luso-austríacos (Portuguese) Portugiesen in Österreich (German)

Total population
- 7,245

Languages
- German, Portuguese

Religion
- Predominantly Christianity (Roman Catholicism), noreligion

Related ethnic groups
- Other Portuguese people, Portuguese in Germany, Portuguese in Liechtenstein, Portuguese in Switzerland

Portuguese in Austria (German: Portugiesen in Österreich) are citizens and residents of Austria who are of Portuguese descent.

Portuguese in Austria (also known as Portuguese Austrians/ Austrian–Portuguese Community or, in Portuguese, known as Portugueses na Áustria/ Comunidade portuguesa na Áustria/ Luso-austríacos) are the citizens or residents of Austria whose ethnic origins lie in Portugal.

Portuguese Austrians are Portuguese-born citizens with Austrian citizenship or Austrian-born citizens of Portuguese ancestry or citizenship.

There were 7,245 Portuguese people residing in Austria in 2021. The Portuguese constitute approximately 0.08% of the country's population. Portuguese tend not to acquire Austrian nationality – only 34 have done so since 2000 – because, in naturalising as Austrian citizens, they would be deprived of their Portuguese passport.

== History ==
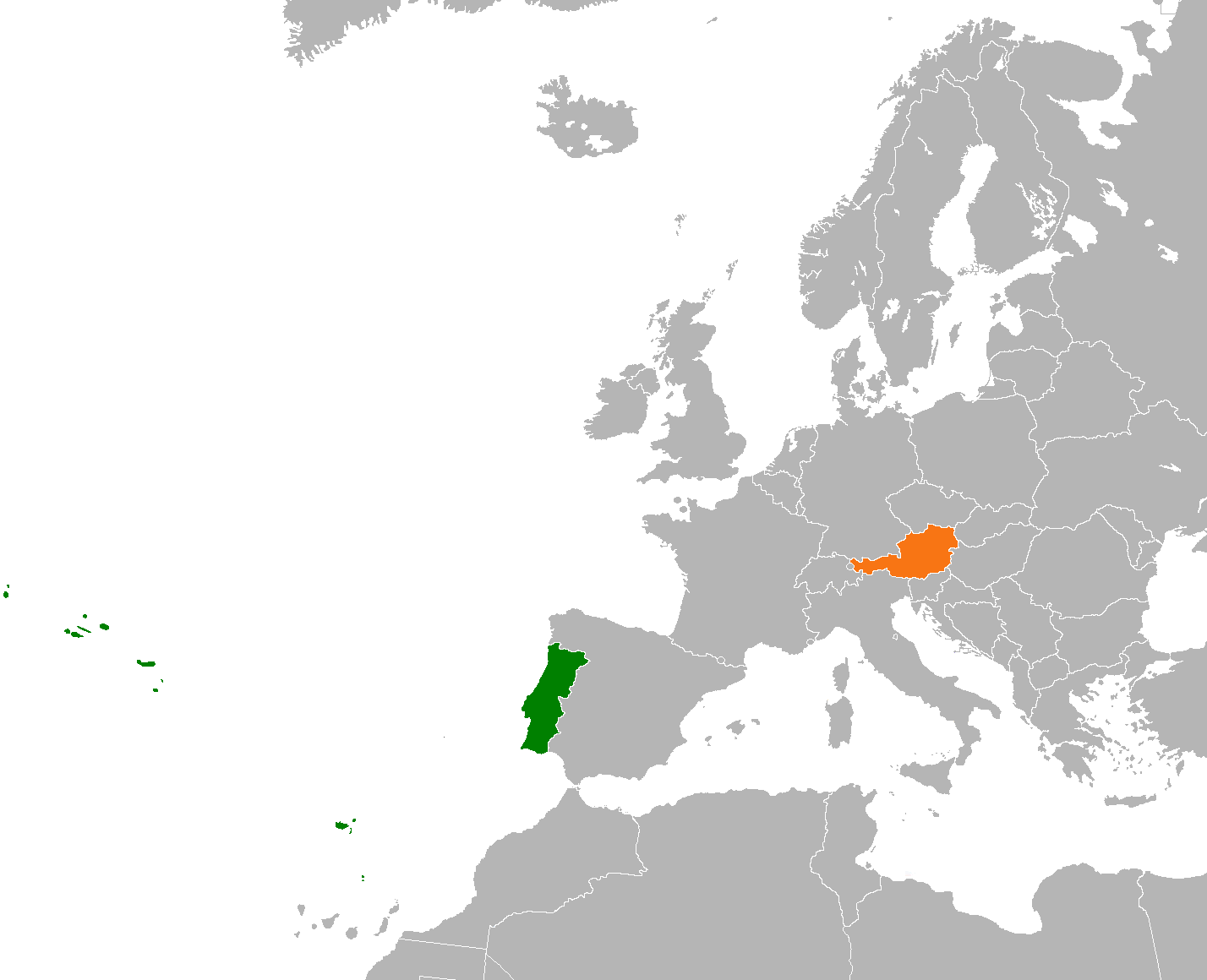
Map showing the location of the two countries within Europe

Portuguese people have had contacts with Austria since the Middle Ages for trade. The connections between Portugal and the then Archduchy of Austria trace back to the 15th century. The presence of a Portuguese Legation in Vienna has been documented since the late 17th century, with the earliest diplomatic mission dating back to April 1696. In addition, members of Portuguese royalty have married Austrian monarchs in many occasions, with one of the first being Eleanor of Portugal.

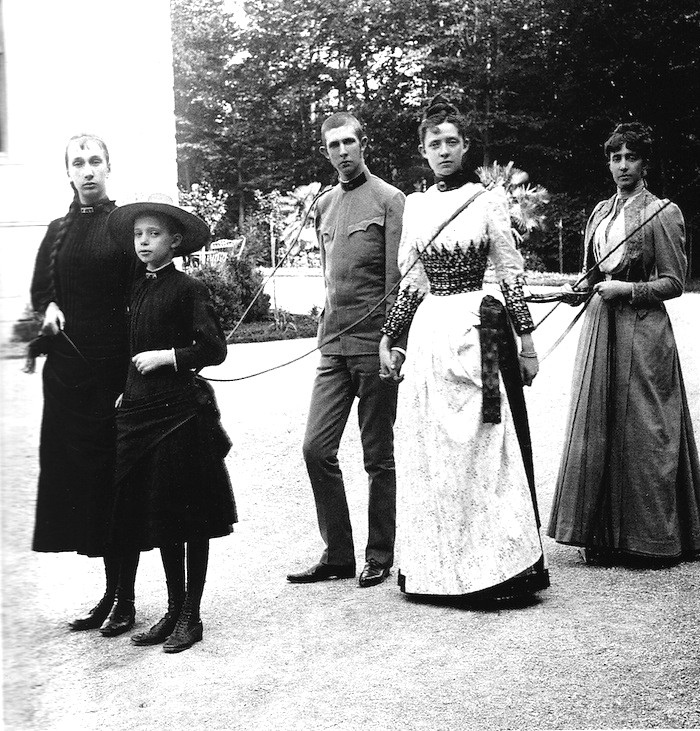
Maria Theresa, Archduchess of Austria (née Infanta of Portugal) with her children

Portuguese people have started migrating to Austria – mainly for economic reasons – only recently, with the first immigrants coming in the late 1980s and early 1990s. The Portuguese community in Austria isn't expressive if compared to the ones found in neighbouring countries such as Switzerland – where immigration was boosted due to French language being widely spoken in Portugal – or Germany, where many Portuguese moved as guest workers in the 1960s.

Portuguese have starting migrating to Austria in larger numbers since the 2008 Recession. Of the almost 11,000 Portuguese that arrived in Austria since 2002, 83.8% did so after 2008 and 68.3% after 2012, year in which the unemployment rate in Portugal soared to 16.1%.

The first Portuguese immigrants coming to Austria reported racism and discrimination events. As time went by – and especially after Austria's accession to the EU – the situation has improved and Portuguese in Austria now enjoy the same rights of other Portuguese citizens. It is noteworthy that Austrian people have helped Portugal in numerous occasions, just like Portugal did (for instance, during WWII). The last major contribution of Austrians to Portuguese was when, during the COVID-19 pandemic in Portugal, Austrian hospitals offered to host some Portuguese patients.

The two countries enjoy friendly relationships and mutual trust, witnessing increasing trade and linguistic cooperation as well. Both countries are EU members. They also share a common currency.

The Portuguese community in the country is highly integrated and qualified. For instance, in 2019 Portuguese chemist Nuno Maulide was considered the "Scientist of the year" in Austria. The Portuguese in Austria are a tight-knitted community and host many events to promote their country.

== Footballers ==
In recent years some Portuguese international footballers have moved to Austria to play for Austrian clubs. In 2023 these included: Micael Liljenberg (ATSV Fischamend) and Bruno Casteleiro (SV Pirka).

== Remittances ==
The Portuguese community in Austria retains strong ties with its homeland and, between 2000 and 2022, it has sent approximately 132.3 million euros (€) to Portugal in remittances. In the same timeframe, Austrians in Portugal (numbering around 1,700 individuals) have sent approximately 5.6 million euros (€) to Austria.

== Portuguese language ==
Despite the Portuguese language lacking widespread knowledge in the country, interest towards Portuguese culture is increasing. According to a 2012 survey carried out by Eurostat, around 0.29% of Austrians spoke Portuguese. This means that is likely that in the country there were around 25,000–30,000 Portuguese speakers in 2012. Due to globalization and immigration – most notably from Brazil – the total number of Lusophones is now probably higher.

In fact, as of today, the Portuguese are part of a wider Portuguese-speaking community in Austria, comprising around 760 people from PALOP countries (the majority being from Angola), Timor-Leste or Macau and around 8,000 Brazilians. People from CPLP countries thus number around 16,000 people, accounting for 0.17% of the population of Austria.

In addition, in Austria there are several elderly individuals who possess a desire to acquire proficiency in the language, motivated by their fondness for it, frequent visits to Portugal, or a simple curiosity and interest in engaging in cognitive exercises.

The Portuguese community has strong ties with its homeland and Portuguese is widely spoken, although younger generations tend to prefer German, especially outside of family setting. The Portuguese language has been incorporated into the curriculum of foreign languages instructed as a native language (ancestral language) within state schools situated in Vienna. This represents a cost-free and discretionary course, made available commencing from the initial year within the Austrian educational framework. The frequency of instruction is scheduled at either a once-weekly or twice-weekly interval, throughout the academic calendar running from September to June. Furthermore, pupils enrolled in private institutions also hold the opportunity to partake in this particular initiative. There are also many institutions providing Portuguese language lessons throughout the country.

== Notable people ==
- Emanuel Viveiros (1966): Canadian-Austrian ice hockey player and coach

== See also ==
- Austria-Portugal relations
- Portuguese in Germany
- Portuguese in Liechtenstein
- Portuguese in Switzerland
