= Andreas Michl =

Austrian footballer (born 1980)

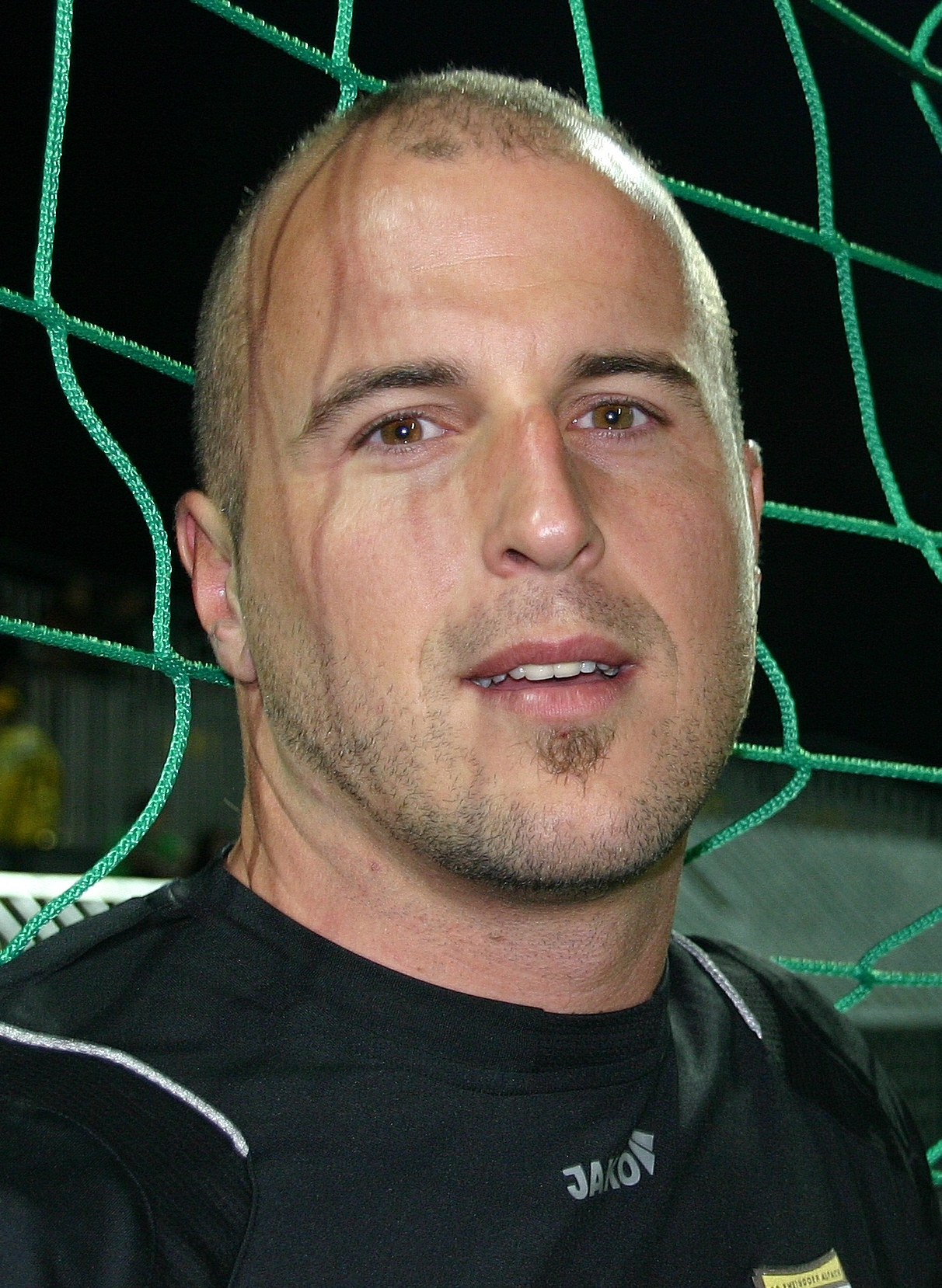
- Michl in 2009

Personal information
- Date of birth: 29 January 1980 (age 46)
- Place of birth: Rotthalmünster, West Germany
- Height: 1.88 m (6 ft 2 in)
- Position: Goalkeeper

Team information
- Current team: SK Schärding
- Number: 24

Senior career*
| Years | Team | Apps | (Gls) |
| 1998–2001 | SK Schärding | | |
| 2001–2006 | SV Ried | 27 | (0) |
| 2007–2009 | Rheindorf Altach | 29 | (0) |
| 2009–2011 | Wacker Burghausen | 16 | (0) |
| 2011 | FC Pasching | 4 | (0) |
| 2011–2012 | SKU Amstetten | 29 | (0) |
| 2012–2016 | ATSV Stadl-Paura | 59 | (1) |
| 2016 | Union St. Florian | 7 | (0) |
| 2017 | Hertha Wels | 15 | (0) |
| 2017–2018 | ATSV Stadl-Paura | 27 | (0) |
| 2018– | SK Schärding | 48 | (0) |
- * Club domestic league appearances and goals as of 17:04, 26 October 2020 (UTC)

Andreas Michl (born 29 January 1980) is an Austrian football goalkeeper who plays for SK Schärding.

== Biography ==
Michl was born on 29 January 1980 in Rotthalmünster, Bavaria, West Germany, and moved to Austria. Michl previously played for SC Rheindorf Altach in the Austrian Football Bundesliga. He played his first match against FK Austria Wien in 2011. He then played against SKU Amstetten in 2012.
