= Germany–Portugal relations =

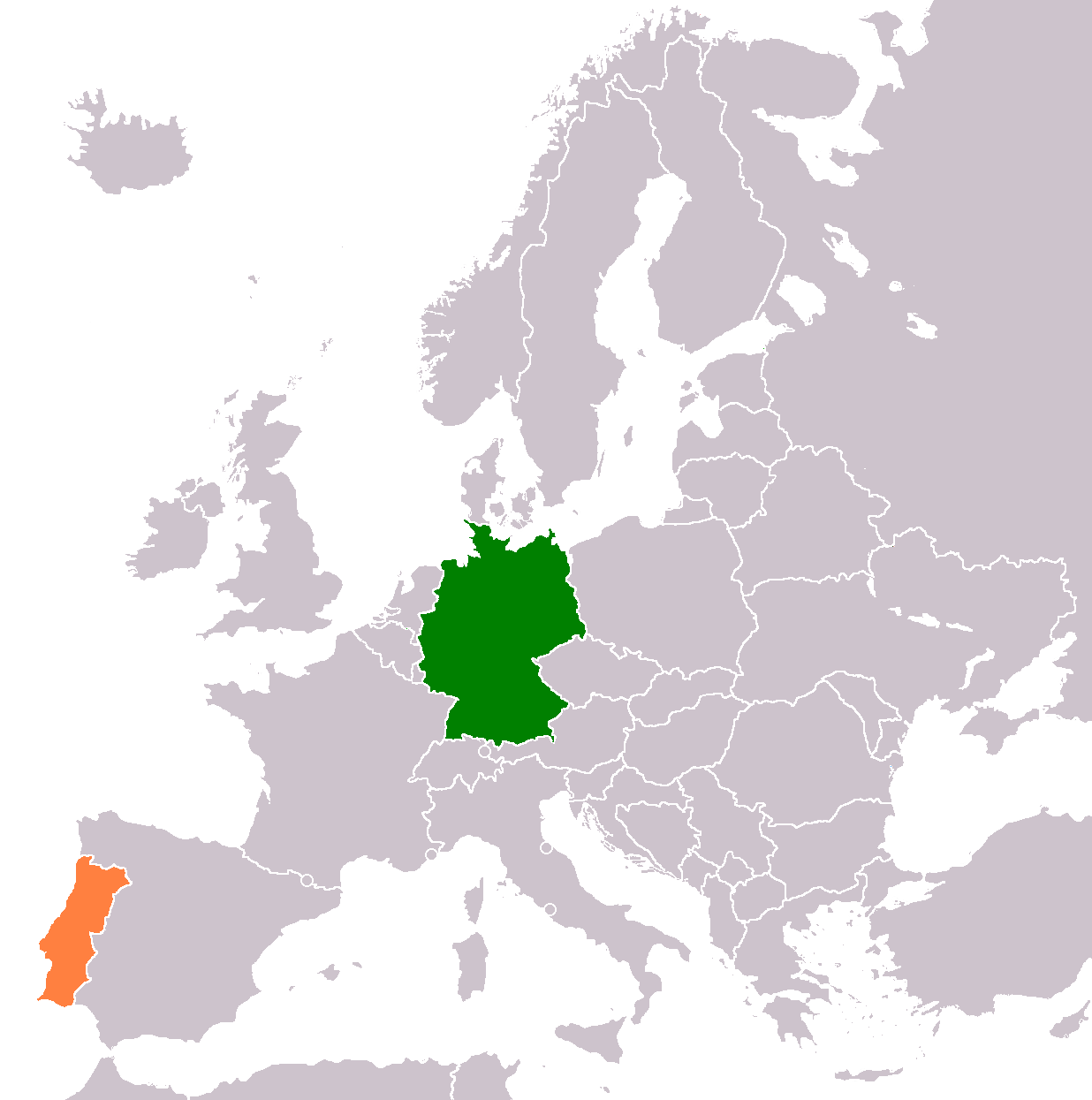

- Germany: Portugal

Germany–Portugal relations (German: deutsch-portugiesische Beziehungen; Portuguese: Relações Teuto-Portuguesas) are the diplomatic relations between Germany and Portugal. Both countries are members of the Council of Europe, the Organisation for Security and Cooperation in Europe, the OECD, NATO, the European Space Agency, the European Union, the Eurozone and the Schengen area, among others.

== History ==
=== Before 1900 ===
In the course of the disintegration of the Western Roman Empire, Germanic tribes conquered the Iberian Peninsula in the early 5th century AD, including the Vandals. The Suebi established an empire in what is now Portuguese territory.

Among the crusaders from the Rhineland (participants in the Second Crusade) who supported Afonso Henriques in his fight against the Arabs, Heinrich aus Bonn is the most famous figure. He played a decisive role in the siege of Lisbon in 1147 and was declared a martyr. He is the only German figure to appear in The Lusiades by Luís de Camões and therefore serves as a popular starting point in bilateral diplomatic oratory.

With Eleonore Helena of Portugal, a Portuguese princess became the wife of the German Emperor Frederick III in 1452.

When the Jews were also expelled from Portugal in the 16th century, some of the merchants among them also went to Hamburg (see also History of the Jews in Hamburg). In 1652, about 1250 Portuguese lived here, who continued to devote themselves mainly to trade and were buried in the Portuguese cemetery opened in 1611. The city owes its economic and cultural boom in the 17th and 18th centuries largely to Portuguese merchant families. This heritage continues to have an impact in Hamburg today, where the most important Portuguese community, also in terms of numbers, is located. With the Portuguese Quarter at the harbour, there is also a Portuguese-influenced café and restaurant district. Specialities such as pastel de nata or galão are best known in Germany today and are already part of everyday culture in Hamburg.

In 1687, Maria Sophia of Neuburg married the King of Portugal Peter II of Portugal in his second marriage, initially on 2 July 1687 per procuram in Heidelberg, while the actual wedding ceremony was performed on 30 August in Lisbon Cathedral.

The 1755 Lisbon earthquake permanently changed the world view in Europe. In Germany, too, this unforeseeable natural disaster met with great sympathy. It also preoccupied many scholars of the Enlightenment, including Goethe, Gotthold Ephraim Lessing and Immanuel Kant. Johann Wolfgang von Goethe published descriptions of the Lisbon earthquake. The Lisbon earthquake became a symbol for the question of God's justification in the face of evil in the world.

In 1762, when war broke out in the service of Portugal, William, Count of Schaumburg-Lippe played a decisive role in Portugal's military success against Spain. The following year, on his advice, the king had the "Fort Graf Lippe" built in front of Elvas in what is now the World Heritage Site of the largest preserved bulwark fortifications in the world.

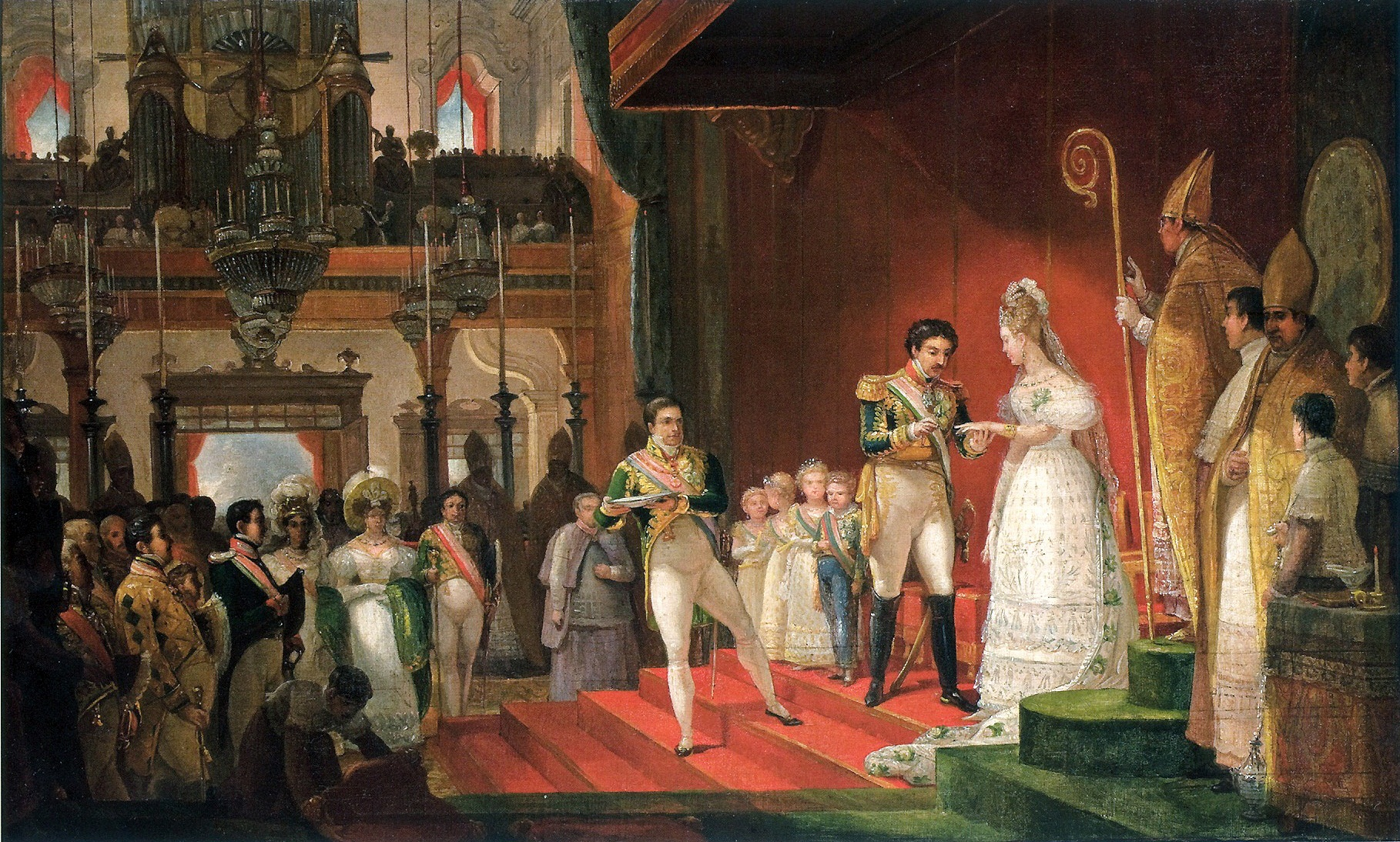
Wedding of Amélie von Leuchtenberg and Emperor Pedro I. 1829, painting by Jean Baptiste Debret

In 1815, the German-born Count Pedro de Sousa Holstein represented Portugal at the Congress of Vienna, where a reorganisation of Europe took place.

On 2 August 1829 Pedro I, Emperor of Brazil married the German Amélie of Leuchtenberg in Munich, in the chapel of the Palais Leuchtenberg wedding by proxy. Her uncle Charles of Bavaria was Pedro's representative. On 25 July 1829, her honorary guardian King Ludwig I of Bavaria ratified the previously negotiated marriage contract. Her brother Auguste de Beauharnais and the renowned naturalist and Brazil expert Carl Friedrich Philipp von Martius accompanied her on her journey from England to Brazil, which began in Portsmouth on 30 August 1829 and ended in the port of Rio de Janeiro on 16 October 1829.

It was a very turbulent time, as shortly afterwards there was a civil war, the so-called Liberal Wars (1832-1834) between the supporters of King Miguell I, whom Frederick, Prince of Hesse-Darmstadt actively supported, and the supporters of his brother, the ex-king Peter IV and his daughter Maria II.

In 1836, the Duke of Palmela was elected Prime Minister in Lisbon after the new Cortes ended the Liberal Wars.

On 9 April 1836, the Portuguese Queen Maria II married the German nobleman Ferdinand of Saxe-Coburg-Gotha. This brought the Portuguese branch of this German noble family, which can be traced back to the House of Wettin and the Margraves of Meissen, to the throne in Portugal.

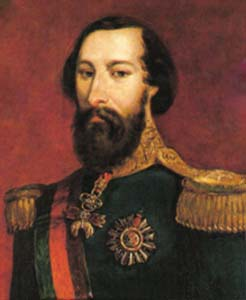
King Ferdinand II of Portugal from the German noble family of Saxe-Coburg and Gotha

Their daughter-in-law Stephanie of Hohenzollern-Sigmaringen (1837-1859) sailed to Lisbon accompanied by her brother Leopold of Hohenzollern and the Prussian Chief Master of Ceremonies Rudolf von Stillfried-Rattonitz and there married her eldest son, King of Portugal Pedro V (1837-1861) in 1858.

In Düsseldorf and later also in Lisbon, the charitably active Stephanie was known to the people as the "Angel of the Poor". Just one year after her death, a monument was erected to her in Düsseldorf: The bust of the Queen on a black marble column was created by Julius Bayerle. The monument to Princess Stephanie of Hohenzollern was renewed in 1890 by the sculptor Josef Tüshaus. Every year on the second Sunday in May, Düsseldorf's marksmen commemorate the Queen on Saint Stephen's Day. In the centre of Düsseldorf, Stephanienstraße commemorates her, and a hospital in the centre of Lisbon is also named after Stephanie. Citizens of Düsseldorf and Lisbon donated a bust in what is now the Portuguese Foreign Ministry. A commemorative plaque can be found on the garden front of Jägerhof Palace in Düsseldorf.

Leopold von Hohenzollern married Antonia Maria of Portugal in Lisbon in 1861, and in 1899 the Prince had Sigmaringen Palace redesigned. He also had the so-called "Portuguese Gallery" built there.

The House of Braganza is closely linked to the noble family of Thurn und Taxis. From 1851 until his death in 1866, the former Portuguese King Miguel I lived in exile in Bronnbach. Miguel I married the German Adelheid von Löwenstein-Wertheim-Rosenberg in 1851. Seven children were born of this marriage, Michael II married Princess Elisabeth von Thurn und Taxis (1860-1881) in Regensburg Cathedral in 1877. Franz Joseph von Thurn und Taxis married Elisabeth of Braganza; his brother Karl August von Thurn und Taxis married her sister Maria Anna of Braganza, from this marriage three children were born.

=== After 1900 ===
==== World War I ====
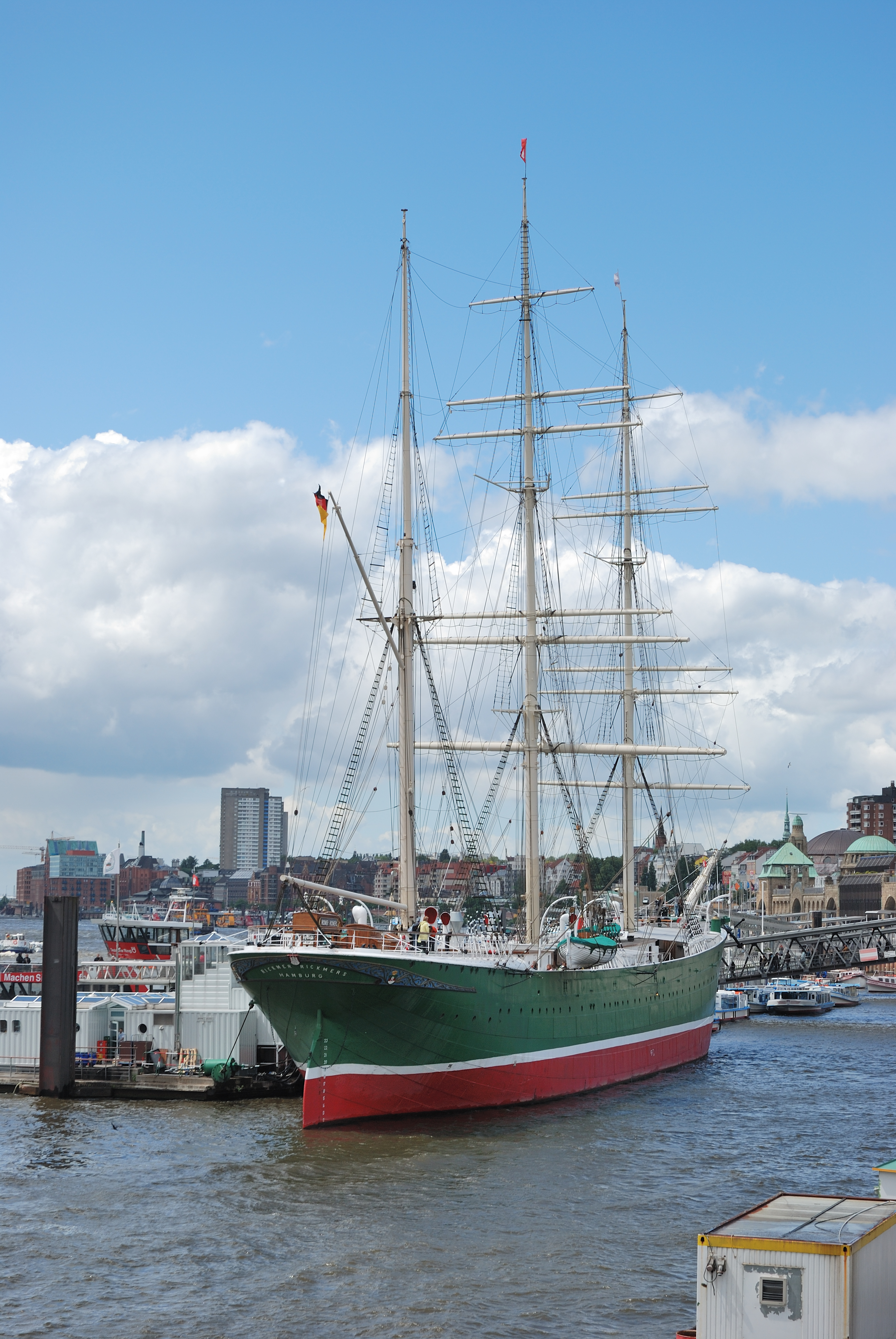
Ship Rickmer Rickmers

With the First World War, anti-German sentiments arose for the first time in Portugal, further fuelled by French war propaganda. After the bombing of Reims Cathedral, a Portuguese protest against German vandalism appeared on 4 October 1914, run by a Liga Anti-Germânica. Among its first signatories was Teófilo Braga. At the request of Great Britain in December 1915, the Portuguese government under Afonso Costa seized the 72 German ships that were in Portuguese ports at the time on 24 February 1916. On behalf of Kaiser Wilhelm II, the German diplomat Friedrich Rosen presented a complaint to the Portuguese government on 27 February to obtain the release of the ships. The government initially claimed not to have received a letter to this effect and rejected the request on 4 March. Germany then declared war on Portugal on 9 March. This made Portugal Germany's eleventh opponent. Decrees were issued in Portugal on 20 and 23 April 1916 which not only expelled resident Germans but also reversed naturalisations. Economic and scientific relations were hit hard by this measure. A Portuguese Expeditionary Force entered into its first direct military conflict with German troops in April 1918 at the Fourth Battle of Flanders (apart from the previous battle for Naulila in Africa, in December 1914), ending in a traumatic defeat for Portugal and further inflaming anti-German sentiment against O Monstro Alemão (the title of a pamphlet by Guerra Junqueiro). During the First World War, about 5,000 Portuguese prisoners of war were temporarily held in Germany, mostly in the specially built prisoner-of-war camp at Breesen, but occasionally in other camps, such as Soltau-Ahlften.

Among the ships confiscated in 1916 was the German Rickmer Rickmers. From 1924 it served the Portuguese navy as a sail training ship until it was decommissioned in 1962 and lay as a depot ship in the naval port of Alfeite near Lisbon. It was replaced by the sailing ship Sagres, also built in Germany in 1937. The Rickmer Rickmers returned to Hamburg in 1983 and has been moored as a museum ship in the Port of Hamburg at the St. Pauli Piers since 1987.

==== World War II ====
During the Second World War, Nazi Germany was supplied with tungsten for weapons production by the Portuguese Salazar regime. The Portuguese cargo and passenger ship Serpa Pinto transported Germans from abroad to Germany under changeable circumstances and in return brought numerous refugees out of Germany and Europe.

In the last three years of the Second World War, Portuguese were also deported to German concentration camps, mostly from occupied France. Several dozen of them perished there.

Before that, in 1941, about 150 Portuguese volunteers within the Spanish Blue Division had gone to war on the side of Nazi Germany. They were mainly alumni of the Viriato Legion and fought on the Eastern Front.

==== After 1945 ====
In 1964, a Migration treaty between the Federal Republic of Germany and Portugal was signed. It laid the foundation for Portuguese guest workers in Germany. In September 1964, the Portuguese Armando Rodrigues de Sá was welcomed as the millionth guest worker in Germany by the then German Interior Minister Hermann Höcherl.

From 1965 until the end of 1993, the German Armed Forces maintained their Tactical Air Force Training Command in Portugal, stationed at Beja Airport in the southern Alentejo.

Germany supported the Democratization of Portugal after the fall of António de Oliveira Salazar and Portugal's accession to the European Community in 1986. After German reunification in 1990, Portugal supported the exemption of the new German states from the EC's ban on admitting new states, which was in force at the time.

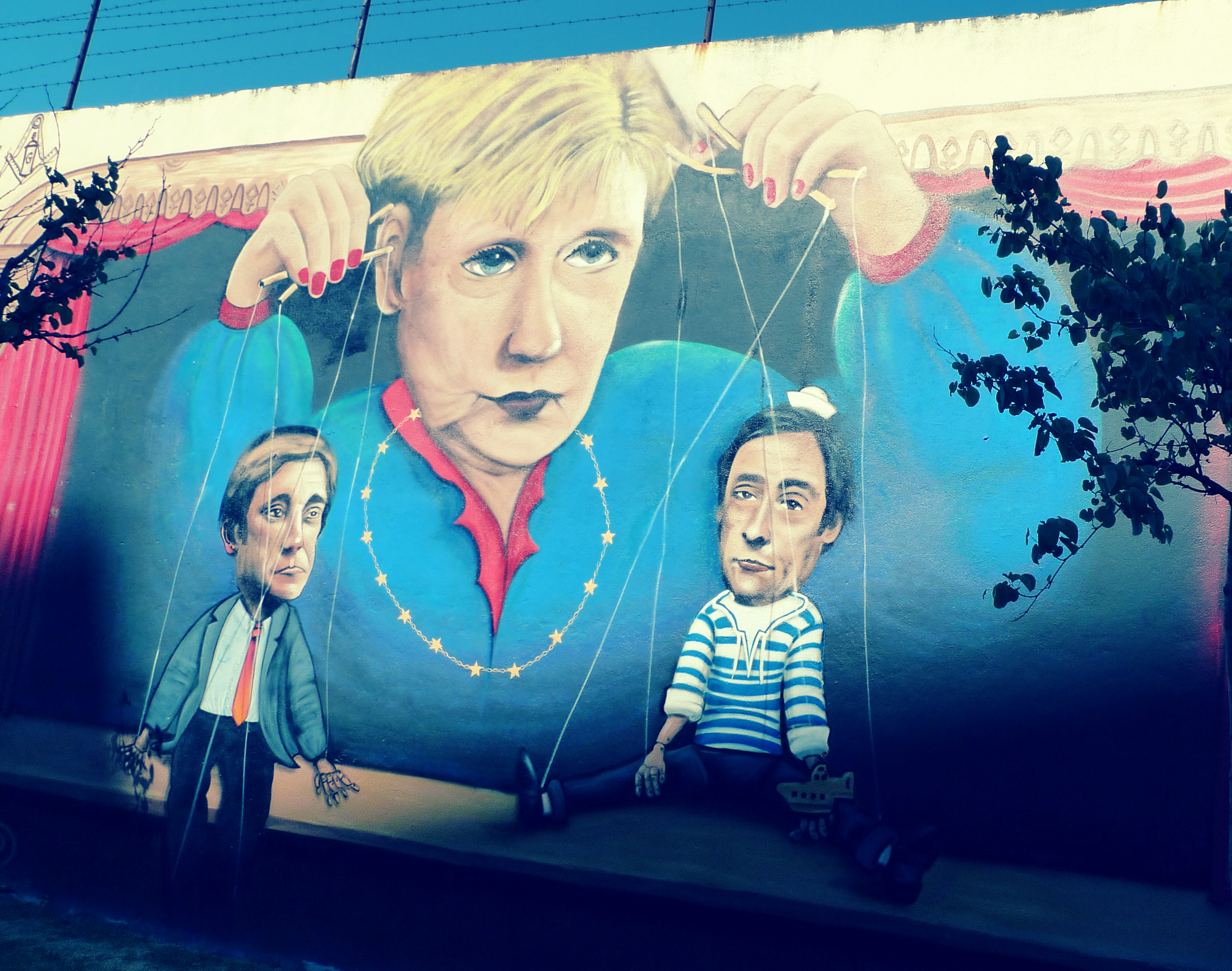
Anti-German graffiti in Lisbon

Germany and Portugal met the EU convergence criteria to introduce the Euro in 1999 and both introduced it as cash at the same time in 2002.

Portugal suffered from the euro area crisis after the 2008 financial crisis. Germany was one of the strongest proponents of austerity here, with Troika-supervised measures leading to wage cuts, tax increases and deep social cuts in Portugal, which until before the crisis had a lower public debt ratio than Germany, among others. As a result, some Portuguese criticized German policies and accused Chancellor Angela Merkel and Finance Minister Schäuble of implementing a policy that unilaterally burdened the people in favour of the financial sector. In this context, civil society groups in Portugal occasionally recalled Portugal's solidarity-based support for Germany in its unilaterally declared debt relief after reunification in 1990, or the new debt limit violated in 2005, where Portugal was among the supporters of suspending the planned sanctions against Germany.

As a result of rising unemployment after the economic crisis in Portugal, immigration from Portugal to Germany also increased again, especially since the 2010s. In contrast to the first generation of the 1960s, mostly highly qualified people now came, who encountered a large number of unfilled jobs, especially as engineers and in health care.

== Economic relations ==
The AHK German-Portuguese Chamber of Industry and Commerce was founded in 1954. Bilateral trade volume in 2021 amounted to 17.1 billion euros, with Germany importing 7.1 billion euros worth of goods from the country and supplying 10 billion euros worth of goods in return. Thus, Germany is one of the most important trading partners for Portugal. Three German companies are among the ten largest exporters in Portugal. A significant factor here is the company Volkswagen Autoeuropa near Palmela. Many more German companies are active in Portugal like Siemens, Robert Bosch, SAP, Continental, Leica Camera and Kirchhoff Automotive. The German discounter Lidl has a strong presence in Portugal.

The most important Portuguese companies in Germany include Inapa and the German branch of the Portuguese paper manufacturer The Navigator Company in Cologne, but also Sonae Industria and Sonae Sierra. Sonae Sierra operates some shopping centres in Germany. Some Portuguese banks are also represented in Germany, including Caixa Geral de Depósitos, which has its own branch in Berlin.

=== Tourism ===
Portugal is considered a popular destination among German holidaymakers and Germans are the third largest group of visitors after the British and the Spanish. In 2012, 813,248 German tourists visited Portugal, which represented an increase of 9.9 per cent compared to the previous year. The total increase in tourists was 3.9 per cent. The majority of German tourists visit the Algarve, followed by Lisbon and Madeira.

== Cultural relations ==
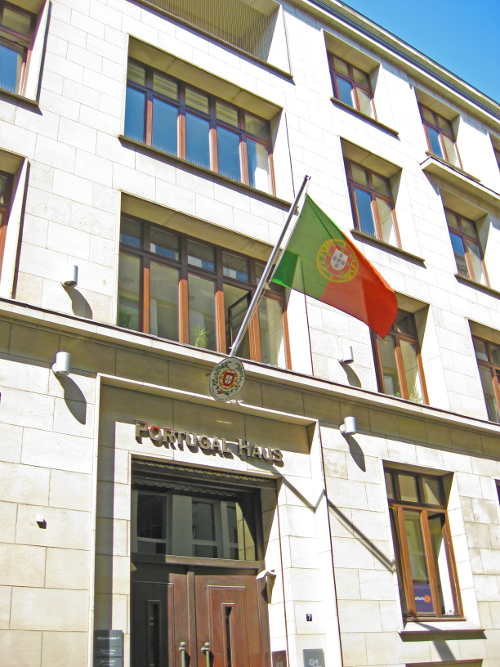
Portugal-Haus in Hamburg

In 1848, the German School Lisbon was founded in Lisbon, followed by the German Association (clube almao em Lisboa) in 1870. Several German and Portuguese universities maintain academic relations. In 1999, the Master German-Portuguese Studies was established at the University of Minho, which existed until 2009 and was restarted in partnership with the Johann Wolfgang Goethe University Frankfurt am Main.

With the German School of Lisbon in 1848 and the German School of Porto in 1855, two German encounter schools exist. In addition, the German School Algarve (Escola Alemã do Algarve) has existed in Silves since 1996, although it is not one of the official German schools abroad.

In Germany, there are projects at a large number of schools, ranging from supplementary mother-tongue teaching to Portuguese as a subject for the Abitur, for example at the Max-Planck-Gymnasium in Dortmund since 1980.

There are two Goethe-Instituts in Portugal, in Lisbon and Porto. The Portuguese counterpart, the Instituto Camões, maintains a language centre in Hamburg and a cultural centre in Berlin, in addition to a number of collaborations and lectorates.

The German artist Ingo Kühl met a number of prominent artists and collectors in 1985 at the Centro Cultural São Lourenço in the Portuguese town of Almancil, including Günter Grass, Heinz Ludwig Arnold, João Cutileiro, José de Guimarães, and Kurt Mühlenhaupt. His career received crucial further impulses thereafter.

In 2009, a subsidiary of the Fraunhofer-Gesellschaft in the field of key technologies was established in Porto. The renowned Portuguese computer scientist José Luis Encarnação had already founded the Fraunhofer Institute for Computer Graphics in Darmstadt in 1987.

Since 2013, an annual German-Portuguese Forum has been held alternately in Berlin and Lisbon, bringing together high-ranking representatives of both countries from politics, business, academia and civil society.

== Migration ==
In mid-2013, there were about 25,000 German citizens living in Portugal, especially in the Algarve region. In 2015, there were 133,929 Portuguese citizens living in Germany, who are generally regarded as well integrated. The largest group, with about 9,000 Portuguese, lives in the Hanseatic city of Hamburg, which has the oldest and most diverse connections to Portugal in Germany.

== Diplomatic missions ==
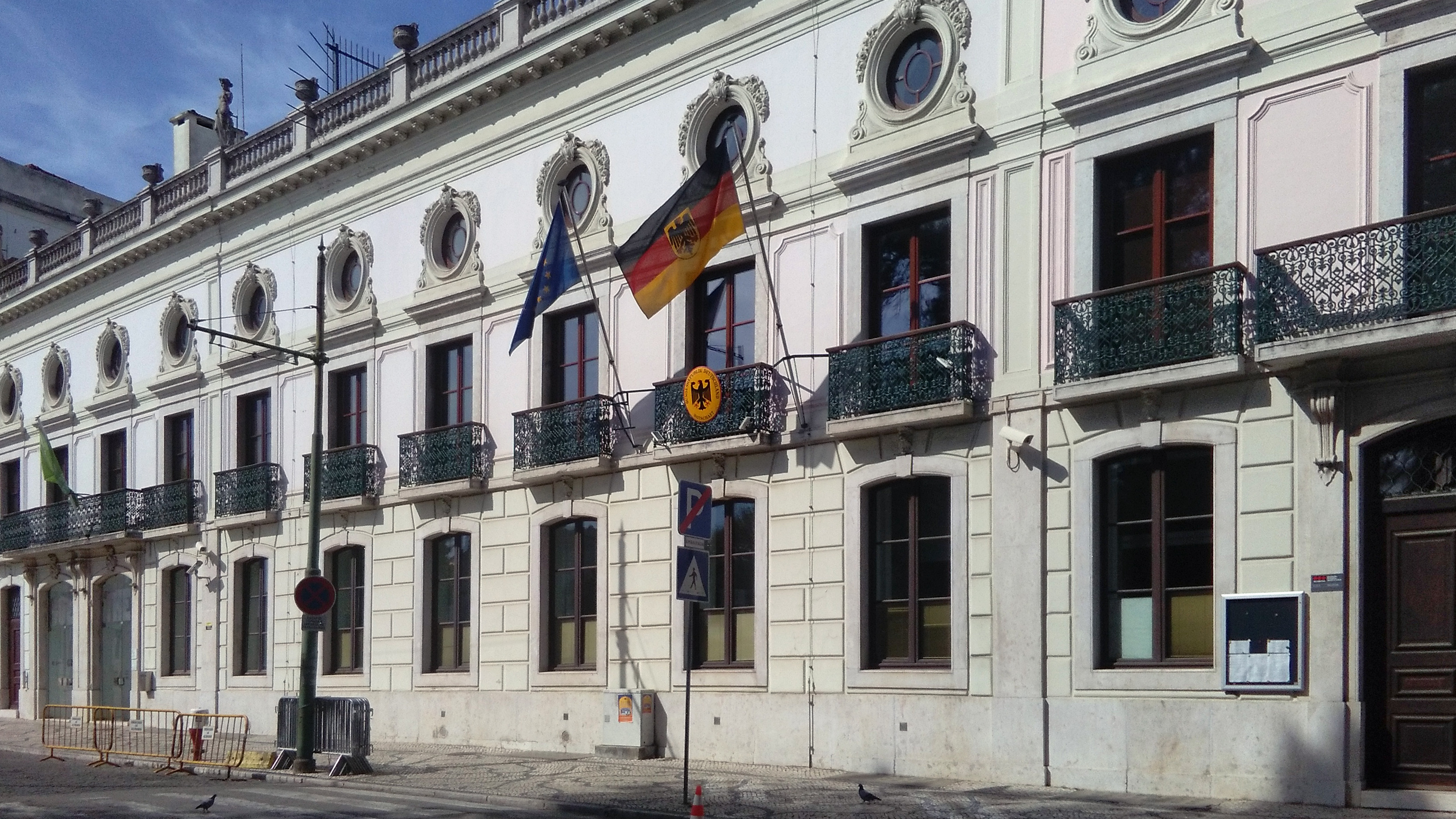
Embassy of Germany in Lisbon

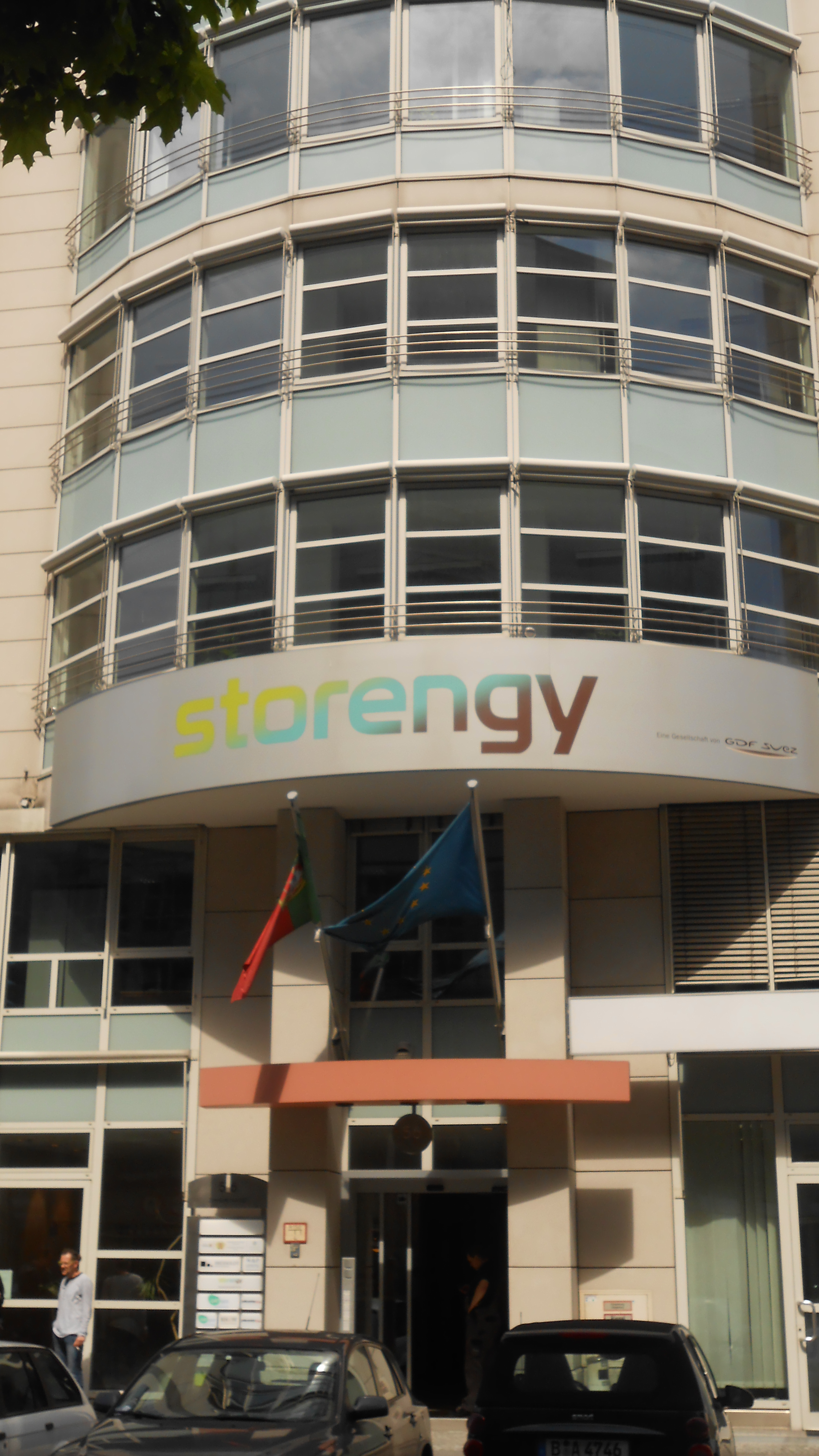
Embassy of Portugal in Berlin

- Germany has an embassy in Lisbon.
- Portugal has an embassy in Berlin and consulates-general in Hamburg, Stuttgart and Düsseldorf.

== See also ==
- Foreign relations of Germany
- Foreign relations of Portugal
- Portuguese in Germany

== Literature ==
=== In German ===
- João Barrento, Klaus Pörtl: Verflechtungen. Deutschland und Portugal. TFM-Verlag, Frankfurt am Main 2002, ISBN 3-925203-89-3 .
- Michael Studemund-Halévy: Portugal in Hamburg. Ellert & Richter Verlag, Hamburg 2007, ISBN 978-3-8319-0267-5.
- Peter Koj: Português, meu amor. Schmetterling Verlag, Stuttgart 2015, ISBN 978-3-89657-875-4.
- Uli Jürgens: Ziegensteig ins Paradies: Exilland Portugal. Mandelbaum Verlag, Wien 2015, ISBN 978-3-85476-471-7.
- Eduardo Lourenço: Portugal - Europa: Mythos und Melancholie. Essays. TFM-Verlag, Frankfurt am Main 1997, ISBN 3-925203-58-3

=== In Portuguese ===
- Maria Manuela Gouveia Delille: Portugal - Alemanha : Memórias e Imaginários (Primeiro Volume da Idade Média ao Séc. XVIII). Edições Minerva, Coimbra 2010, ISBN 978-972-798-208-0.
- Maria Manuela Gouveia Delille: Portugal - Alemanha : Memórias e Imaginários (Segundo Volume Séc. XIX e XX). Edições Minerva, Coimbra 2010, ISBN 978-972-798-288-2.
- Fernando Ribeiro: Alemanha: Portugal. Edições Humus, Ribeirão 2014, ISBN 978-989-755-025-6 .
- A. H. de Oliveira Marques, Alfred Opitz, Fernando Clara (eds.): Portugal - Alemanha - África: do Imperialismo Colonial ao Imperialismo Político. Edições Colibri, Lissabon 2007, ISBN 978-972-8288-28-0.
- Luísa Coelho: Encontros Por Contar Alemanha e Portugal. Orfeu, Brüssel 2014, ISBN 978-2-87530-044-7 .
