= Innviertler Cup =

Innviertler Fussballcup
- Founded: 1959
- Region: Austria
- Teams: 15-78
- Current champions: Union Esternberg
- Most championships: Union Esternberg (6 titles)
- Website: https://www.innviertlercup.at/

The Innviertler Fussballcup known as the Innviertler Cup, is an is a football tournament held by the Austrian Football Association for regional teams that occurs every 2 years. Union Esternberg is the current champion.

== History ==
The tournament was first held in 1959. It featured an 18 team two leg qualifying round with 11 teams qualifying for the 2nd round. 5 new teams joined in at the 2nd round to create a 16 team two leg round. The 3rd round had 8 teams in a two leg round and the semi-finals and finals were both single leg rounds. In the finals, SK Altheim defeated Grieskirchen while Riedau beat Eberschwang to finish in 3rd place. The two leg format was dropped permanently after.

The tournament grew in various years, ranging from 15 to 78 teams for some of the 1980s editions. The 2024 edition of the tournament had 32 teams competing.

== Tournament winners ==
Year	Champions
1959	SK Altheim
1961	Eberschwang
1963	Kohlgrube
1965	SK Altheim
1967	SK Altheim
1969	Union Suben
1971	Antiesenhofen
1973	SK Schärding
1975	Natternbach
1977	SV Grieskirchen
1979	SV Grieskirchen
1981	Natternbach
1983	Union Haag
1985	SV Ried
1987	Union Esternberg
1989	Union Esternberg
1991	SK Altheim
1993	SK Altheim
1995	FC Andorf
1997	Union Esternberg
1999	ATSV Ranshofen
2001	Union Gurten
2003	SV Riedau
2005	Union Gurten
2007	Union Esternberg
2009	Union Esternberg
2011	ATSV Ranshofen
2013	Union Gurten
2015	ATSV Ranshofen
2017	FC Andorf
2019	Union Senftenbach
2022	UFC Peterskirchen
2024	Union Esternberg
