= SK Schärding =

German association football club from Schärding Upper Austria, Austria

- Full name: Sportklub Waizenauer Schärding
- Founded: April 1, 1922
- Ground: Baunti Arena
- Chairman: Silvio Vitale
- Coach: Bernhard Straif
- League: Landesliga West
- Website: https://www.sk-schaerding.at/
Home colours	Away colours

SK Schärding (German: Sportklub Waizenauer Schärding) is an Austrian football club in Schärding, Upper Austria, Austria.

== History ==
The club was founded in 1922 by a group of young adults as SK Sturm Schärding. The club wore white and black their jerseys were made by their mothers. A farmer in St. Florian am Inn let the team use his fields as a temporary arena. The club switched to black and red in 1925, based on 1. FC Nürnberg.

The club mainly played with Bavarian clubs, since the only Austrian clubs nearby were Ried and Braunau. The team became known as FC Schärding through 1925-1934 and officially became SK Schärding in 1934. There was a border blockade from 1933 to 1935 which meant the team could not play Bavarian teams and it prevented multiple Schärding players from being able to play with the team.

In 1934, another sports club named ATSV Schärding was dissolved and the members of it joined SK Schärding.

The club built momentum following World War II, winning the Austrian 5. Liga's Gruppe D in 1945–46, then winning the 2. Klasse F in 1946-47 and then coming in 2nd in the 2. Klasse D in 1947–48, which gained them promotion to the 4. Liga's 1. Klasse West. They finished in the top 3 of the 1. Klasse West most years between 1948–55 and started playing at a new stadium called Rennbahnstadion, which was a former racecourse. The team won the 1. Klasse West in the 1955–56 season and were promoted to the 3. Liga's Landesliga.

The team were not as successful in the Landesliga and were eventually demoted to the 4. Liga, Bezirksliga West in 1967–68. There were league structure changes and the team ended up in the 5. Liga's Bezirksliga West in 1970–71. The team won the 1973 Innviertler Cup and won the Bezirksliga West in 1974–75 to earn promotion to the 4. Liga's 2. Landesliga West. The team had multiple finishes in the top 3 from 1976–77 to 1981-82 but starting struggling in the 1983–84 season.

The team won the 2. Landesliga West in 1986-87 and were promoted to the 2. Landesliga in 1988–89. The club won the 2. Landesliga in 1993-94 and were promoted to a new regional version of the 1. Landesliga. The club was demoted from the 4. Liga's 1. Landesliga in 1998-99 and then were demoted from the 5. Liga's 2. Landesliga West in 1999–00. The club won the 6. Liga's Bezirksliga West in 2000–01. The club was neither promoted or demoted from 2001 to 2018 and had their 2019-20 and 2020–21 seasons partially cancelled due to the COVID-19 pandemic.

== Notable personnel ==
- Heribert Trubrig - Played for the club and later played 10 games for the Austria national team.
- Andreas Michl - He played for the club from 1998 to 1901 and later played for SC Rheindorf Altach in the Austrian Football Bundesliga.
- Edi Kirschner - He played for Bayern Munich and later coached Schärding from 1993 to 1994.
- Valentin Grubeck - He played for the team and later made youth appearances for the Austria national team. He then played for SV Grödig in the Austrian Football Bundesliga.
- Fabian Grubeck - He played for the team from 2002 to 2010 then played for SV Grödig in the Austrian Football Bundesliga. He returned to Schärding in 2017.
- Miroslav Štěpánek - He played for the club from 2016 to 2017 and played for the Czech Republic national youth football team.
- Mijo Miletic - He started playing for the club in 2022 and previously had played for the Bosnia and Herzegovina national under-17 football team.

== In popular culture ==
SK Schärding is featured in the video game series, Football Manager.

== Honors ==
- 2. Klasse D

Champions: 1947-48

- 1. Klasse West

Champions: 1955-56

- Innviertler Cup

Champions: 1973

- Bezirksliga West

Champions: 1974-75, 2000-01

- 2. Landesliga West

Champions: 1986-87

- 2. Landesliga

Champions: 1993-94
