= Portuguese in Liechtenstein =

Liechtensteiner Portuguese
Luso-liechtensteinianos (Portuguese) Portugiesen in Liechtenstein (German)
- (Liechtenstein) (Portugal)

Total population
- 969

Languages
- German, Portuguese

Religion
- Predominantly Christianity (Roman Catholicism), Irreligion

Related ethnic groups
- Other Portuguese people, Portuguese in Austria, Portuguese in Germany, Portuguese in Switzerland

Portuguese in Liechtenstein (German: Portugiesen in Liechtenstein) are citizens and residents of Liechtenstein who are of Portuguese descent.

Portuguese in Liechtenstein (also known as Portuguese Liechtensteiners/ Liechtensteiner-Portuguese Community or, in Portuguese, known as Portugueses no Liechtenstein/ Comunidade portuguesa no Liechtenstein/ Luso-liechtensteinianos) are the citizens or residents of Liechtenstein whose ethnic origins lie in Portugal.

Portuguese Liechtensteiners are Portuguese-born citizens with Liechtensteiner citizenship or Liechtensteiner-born citizens of Portuguese ancestry or citizenship.

There were 969 Portuguese citizens residing in Liechtenstein in 2020. Thirteen Portuguese have acquired Liechtensteiner citizenship since 2008. The Portuguese constitute approximately 2.44% of the country's population.

== History ==
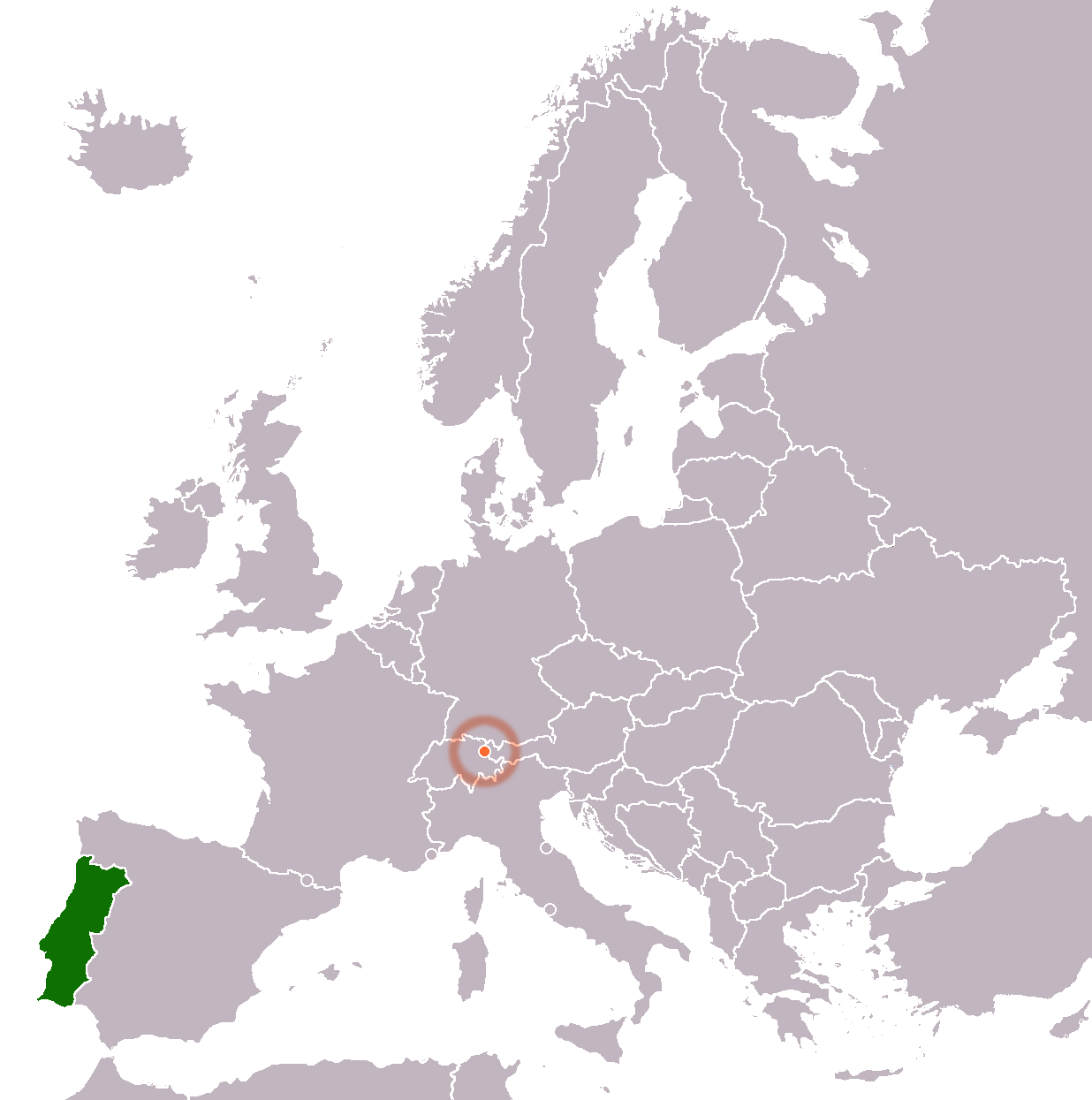
Location of the two countries within Europe

The history of the Portuguese community in Liechtenstein is recent and is linked to the Portuguese community in neighbouring Switzerland. In fact, there are no Portuguese missions in the country and the Portuguese living in Liechtenstein are under the authority of Portuguese consular authorities in Switzerland. Between 2008 and 2021 182 Portuguese moved to the country, representing 2.21% of the total number of those who did so. Unsurprisingly, almost half of the migratory movement from Portugal to Liechtenstein occurred during the Portuguese economic crisis.

The demographic breakdown of the Portuguese community in Liechtenstein reveals that most individuals are in the prime of their working years, while there exists a smaller contingent of individuals aged 60 or above. In terms of gender, there is a marginal numerical advantage of males over females, attributable to the fact that specific industries have a greater tendency to employ male expatriate labor. The dominant fields of occupation encompass cleaning services, civil infrastructure development, the hospitality industry, and agriculture.

The community is tight-knitted and has its own cultural centre (Centro Português do Liechtenstein). The community is especially visible when there are football matches involving the Portuguese national football team, which has a strong support throughout the country.

The two countries enjoy friendly relationships and mutual trust, witnessing stable trade levels at around 0.6 million euros (€) per year, for a Portuguese surplus of 0.4 million euros.

== Footballers ==
In recent years some Portuguese international footballers have moved to Liechtenstein in order to play for Liechtensteiner clubs. For instance, in 2023 there were 5 Portuguese playing for FC Triesen (Valerio Lage Martins, Sérgio Percina Ferreira, Heitor Ferreira da Fonseca, Luan Oliveira, Hugo Gomes Ferreira), 2 playing for FC Vaduz (Diogo Afonso Cordeiro, Alexandre Manuel Moreira Nunes, ), 4 playing for FC Schaan (Estevan Varela, Igor Miguéis, Justin Pires, Helder Gonçalves) 3 playing for FC Balzers (Ramon Serralva Marques, Dilan Serralva Marques, Vitor Monteiro) and 1 playing for FC Triesenberg (Ricardo Maia).

== Portuguese language ==
The Portuguese language is quite visible in Liechtenstein, due that 2.44% of the country's inhabitants are Portuguese citizens. Interest towards the language remains strong and many kids, especially Portuguese nationals, study Portuguese with help from Portuguese authorities.

As of today, the Portuguese are part of a wider Portuguese-speaking community in Liechtenstein, comprising around 200 Brazilians.

== Notable people ==
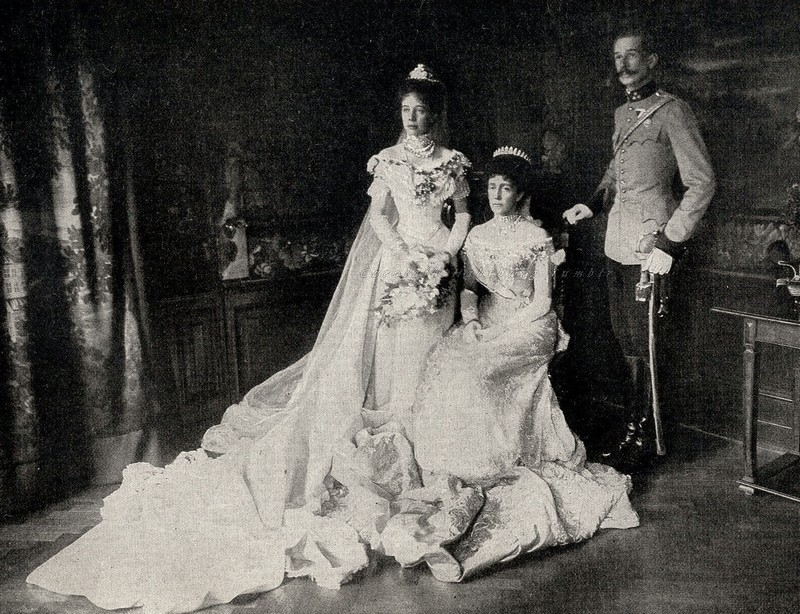
The wedding of Archduchess Elisabeth Amalie of Austria with Prince Aloys of Liechtenstein, posing with the bride's mother, Archduchess Maria Theresa of Austria, née Infanta of Portugal

- Prince Karl Alfred of Liechtenstein (1910-1985): prince and brother of Franz Joseph II. He was the grandson of Infanta Maria Theresa of Portugal.
- Maria-Pia Kothbauer (1960): Ambassador Extraordinary and Plenipotentiary of Liechtenstein to Austria and the Czech Republic, Liechtenstein's Permanent Representative to the Organization for Security and Co-operation in Europe and to the United Nations. Prince Karl Alfred's daughter.
- Prince Heinrich Hartneid of Liechtenstein (1920-1993): Liechtensteiner prince and brother of Franz Joseph II. He was the grandson of Infanta Maria Theresa of Portugal.
- Franz Joseph II, Prince of Liechtenstein (1906-1989): the reigning Prince of Liechtenstein from 25 July 1938 until his death in November 1989. He was the grandson of Infanta Maria Theresa of Portugal.
- Prince Franz Josef of Liechtenstein (1962-1991): was a member of Liechtenstein princely family. Franz Joseph II's son.
- Princess Nora of Liechtenstein (1950): member of Liechtenstein princely family. Franz Joseph II's daughter.
- Prince Philipp of Liechtenstein (1946): member of Liechtenstein princely family. Franz Joseph II's son.
- Prince Nikolaus of Liechtenstein (1947): member of Liechtenstein princely family. Franz Joseph II's son.
- Hans-Adam II, Prince of Liechtenstein (1945): reigning Prince of Liechtenstein, since 1989. Franz Joseph II's son.
- Prince Constantin of Liechtenstein (1972): member of the Princely House of Liechtenstein, and a businessman. He is the third son of Prince Hans-Adam II.
- Prince Maximilian of Liechtenstein (1969): Liechtensteiner prince and businessman. He is the second son of Hans-Adam II, Prince of Liechtenstein.
- Alois, Hereditary Prince of Liechtenstein (1968): heir apparent to the throne of Liechtenstein.
- Prince Joseph Wenzel of Liechtenstein (1995): eldest child of Alois, Hereditary Prince of Liechtenstein. He is second in the line of succession to the Liechtensteiner throne through his father.

== See also ==
- Liechtenstein-Portugal relations
- Portuguese in Austria
- Portuguese in Germany
- Portuguese in Switzerland
