= SV Esternberg =

- Full name: SV Esternberg
- Nickname: Die Sauwaldveilchen (The Violets)
- Founded: 20 July 1952; 74 years ago
- Ground: Heinz Ertl Stadion
- Capacity: 1,000
- President: Wolfgang Ertl
- Coach: Reinhard Völdl
- League: Upper Austrian League West, Upper Austria
- 2025–26: 5th
- Website: http://www.esternberg.com
Home colours	Away colours

Union sports club Esternberg (SVE) is an Austrian association football club based in Esternberg. The club's colors are violet and white.

== History ==
The SVE was founded on July, 20th 1952. In the years 1952 to 1954 only friendly matches and cup tournaments were contested. Entry into the regular championship began the SVE in the 1955–56 season in the Upper Austrian 3rd Class C 1, which was finished on the 9th position.

The biggest success was winning the Upper Austrian League 1995–96 and the associated rise in the Austrian Regional League Central (third highest league in Austria).

Currently, the club plays in the Upper Austrian League West (5th power level).

== Stadium ==
The home games of the SVE will be played at Heinz Ertl Stadium, which was named after the founding member and longtime president Heinz Ertl († April 9, 2014).

== Junior Soccer ==
The youth section of the SVE organizes since 1992 each year the Juniors Indoor Soccer Cup for all age groups in the youth field in the Sports Hall of Schärding.

Now, with nine days of the tournament and over 200 teams participating each year, this is one of the largest youth tournaments in Austria.

Visiting teams from 21 nations were already as Austria, Belgium, Brazil, China, Croatia, Czech Republic, Denmark, England, Finland, France, Germany, Hungary, Netherlands, Norway, Poland, Romania, Scotland, Slovakia, Slovenia, Spain and Switzerland.

== Honours ==
- 1 x Winner of Upper Austrian League (1995–96)
- 1 x Winner of Upper Austrian Cup (1997)
- 6 x Winner of the Innviertler Cup (1987, 1989, 1997, 2007, 2009, 2024)
- 1 x Winner of Upper Austrian League West (1987–88)
- 1 x Winner of Upper Austrian District League West (1978–79)
- 1 x Winner of Upper Austrian 1st Class North West (1977–78)
- 1 x Winner of Upper Austrian 2nd Class West (1966–67)
- 1 x Winner of Upper Austrian 3rd Class Upper Inn Quarter (1960–61)
