= List of football clubs in Austria =

This is a list of football clubs in Austria. For a complete list see Category:Football clubs in Austria

- 1. Wiener Neustädter SC ( :)
- 1. FC Vöcklabruck (Regional League Central)
- Absdorf (2. Landesliga East)
- Amaliendorf (1. Landesliga)
- SKU Amstetten (2. Liga)
- USK Anif (Regional league West)
- Ardagger (1. Landesliga)
- ASK Baumgarten (Regional League East)
- ASK Edelsthal (other)
- ASK Köflach (Landesliga Styria)
- ASK Voitsberg (Regional League Central)
- Asperner Löwenteam (Asperner Löwenteam)
- Austria Graz (other)
- Bad Vöslau (2. Landesliga East)
- FC Blau-Weiss Feldkirch (Regional League West)
- DFC Prag (defunct)
- DSG Union Perg (Upper Austrian League)
- DSV Leoben (Landesliga)
- Enzersfeld (2. Landesliga East)
- FAC Team für Wien (Dissolved)
- Favoritner AC (Wiener Stadtliga)
- FC Admira Wacker (2. Liga)
- FC Blau-Weiß Linz (Bundesliga)
- FC Dynamo Meidling (Viennese 2nd group B)
- FC Hertha Wels (2. Liga)
- FC Gratkorn (First League)
- FC Hard (Regional League West)
- FC Höchst (Regional League West)
- FC Kärnten (Dissolved)
- FC Kärnten Amateurs (Dissolved)
- FC Kufstein (Regional League West)
- FC Lustenau 07 (First League)
- FC Red Bull Salzburg (Bundesliga)
- FC Liefering (2. Liga)
- FC Swarovski Tirol (other)
- FC Tirol Innsbruck (defunct)
- FC Wacker Innsbruck (defunct)
- FC Wacker Tirol (Bundesliga)
- FC Waidhofen an der Ybbs (Regional League East)
- FC Wels (Regional League Central)
- FC Wien (other)
- FCK Welzenegg Amateure (Regional League Central)
- FCU Frankenfels (other)
- ATSV Fischamend (other)
- First Vienna FC (2. Liga)
- FK Austria Wien (Bundesliga)
- Young Violets Austria Wien (2. Liga)
- Floridsdorfer AC (2. Liga)
- FS Elektra (other)
- Götzendorf (2. Landesliga East)
- Grazer AK (Bundesliga)
- Grazer SC (other)
- Haitzendorf (1. Landesliga)
- Herzogenburg (1. Landesliga)
- Himberg (2. Landesliga East)
- Innsbrucker AC (Regional League West)
- Kapfenberger SV (2. Liga)
- Kottingbrunn (1. Landesliga)
- Kremser SC (unknown)
- SV Donau Langenlebarn (2. Landesliga East)
- SV Langenrohr (1. Landesliga)
- LASK (Bundesliga)
- Leobendorf (1. Landesliga)
- Leobersdorf (2. Landesliga East)
- Mistelbach (1. Landesliga)
- Neunkirchen (1. Landesliga)
- ÖMV Olympia (other)
- Ortmann (1. Landesliga)
- Polizei Feuerwehr (Regional League East)
- Post SV Wien (other)
- PSV Team Wien (unknown)
- Purkersdorf (2. Landesliga East)
- SK Rapid Wien Amateure (2. Liga)
- Retz (1. Landesliga)
- Reyersdorf (2. Landesliga East)
- Rot-Weiss Rankweil (Regional League West)
- SAK 1914 (Salzburger Liga)
- SAK Klagenfurt (Regional League Central)
- SC Austria Lustenau (2. Liga)
- SC Austria Lustenau Amateurs (unknown)
- SK Austria Klagenfurt (2. Liga)
- SK Bischofshofen (other)
- SC Bregenz (Regional League West)
- SC Eisenstadt (Regional League East)
- SV Gloggnitz (other)
- SC Hakoah Wien (defunct)
- SC Maccabi Wien (other)
- SC Neusiedl am See 1919 (Regional League East)
- SC Rheindorf Altach (Bundesliga)
- SC Ritzing (unknown)
- SC Schwanenstadt (First League)
- SC Wiener Neustadt (Bundesliga)
- SC Weiz (Regional League Central)
- SC Zwettl (Regional League East)
- SC-ESV Parndorf 1919 (First League)
- Schrems (1. Landesliga)
- SK Austria Kärnten (Dissolved)
- SK Kundl (Regional League West)
- SK Rapid Wien (Bundesliga)
- SK St. Andrä (Regional League Central)
- SK Sturm Graz (Bundesliga)
- SK Sturm Graz Amateure (2. Liga)
- SK Vienna Dragons (Landesliga East)
- SKN St. Pölten (2. Liga)
- Slovan HAC (other)
- Sollenau (2. Landesliga East)
- SPG Axams/Götzens (Regional League West)
- SPG Reichenau (Regional League West)
- SK Schwadorf (Regional League East)
- SV Stockerau (1. Landesliga)
- SV Allerheiligen (Regional League Central)
- SV Austria Salzburg (2. Liga)
- SV Bad Aussee (First League)
- FC Dornbirn 1913 (Regional League West)
- SV Esternberg (Upper Austrian League West)
- SV Feldkirchen (Regional League Central)
- SV Gmunden (Regional League Central)
- SV Grieskirchen (Regional League Central)
- SV Grödig (Regional League West)
- SV Hall (Regional League West)
- SV Horn (Regional League East)
- SV Lafnitz (Regional League Central)
- SV Mattersburg (Dissolved)
- SV Mattersburg Amateurs (Dissolved)
- SV Ried (Bundesliga)
- SV Schwechat (Regional League East)
- SV Seekirchen 1945 (Regional League West)
- 1. SC Simmering (other)
- SV Spittal an der Drau (Regional League Central)
- SV St. Veit an der Glan (other)
- SV Stadlau (other)
- SV Stickstoff Linz (other)
- SV Wienerberg (Regional League East)
- SV Würmla (Regional League East)
- SV Grenzland Bleiburg (Regional League Central)
- Theresienfeld (2. Landesliga East)
- TSV Hartberg (Bundesliga)
- Tulln (2. Landesliga East)
- WSG Radenthein (other)
- Union St. Florian (Regional League Central)
- USK Anif (Regional League West)
- VfB Admira Wacker Mödling II (Regional League East)
- VfB Hohenems (unknown)
- Vösendorf (1. Landesliga)
- Wiener AC (other)
- Wiener AF (other)
- Wiener Sport-Club (Regional League East)
- Wolkersdorf (2. Landesliga East)
- Wiener Neustadt (2. Landesliga East)
- WSG Tirol (Bundesliga)
- Gaflenz (2. Landesliga (West)
- Großriedenthal (2. Landesliga West)
- Hofstetten (2. Landesliga West)
- Karlstetten (2. Landesliga West)
- Mank (2. Landesliga West)
- Neulengbach (2. Landesliga West)
- Oberndorf (2. Landesliga West)
- Oed/Z. (2. Landesliga West)
- Sieghartskirchen (2. Landesliga West)
- Spratzern (2. Landesliga West)
- St. Peter (2. Landesliga West)
- Sturm 19 St. Pölten (2. Landesliga West)
- SV Waidhofen an der Thaya (2. Landesliga West)
- Zwentendorf (2. Landesliga West)
