= Marcelo Salinas =

Chilean footballer (born 1995)

Personal information
- Full name: Marcelo Salinas Paulino
- Date of birth: 29 May 1995 (age 31)
- Place of birth: Langenhagen, Germany
- Height: 1.90 m (6 ft 3 in)
- Position: Goalkeeper

Youth career
- 2003–2004: Hannover 96
- 2004–2007: TUS Wettbergen
- 2008–2012: Wolfsburg
- 2012–2013: Colo-Colo
- 2013–2014: Borussia Dortmund

Senior career*
Years	Team	Apps	(Gls)
2016–2017	Unión Española	1	(0)

International career
2011	Portugal U17	3	(0)
2012	Chile U20	8	(0)
- * Club domestic league appearances and goals as of 20 February 2017

Marcelo Salinas Paulino (born 29 May 1995), known also as Marcelo Paulino, is a footballer who plays as a goalkeeper. Born in Germany, he has represented both Portugal and Chile at youth level.

== Club career ==
As a youth player, Salinas was with Hannover 96, TUS Wettbergen, Wolfsburg and Borussia Dortmund in Germany and Colo-Colo in Chile.

In January 2016, he joined Unión Española in the Chilean Primera División and made his professional debut in a match versus O'Higgins by replacing Cristián Guerra.

== International career ==
Previously to 2013 FIFA U-20 World Cup, he took part of Chile, making appearances in the 2012 Milk Cup. Before he had made appearances for both Portugal and Germany at youth level.

== Personal life ==
His father is Chilean and his mother is Portuguese.
